= List of hospitals in Queens =

This is a list of hospitals in Queens, New York City, sorted by hospital name, with addresses and a brief description of their formation and development. Hospital names were obtained from these sources.

== Hospitals ==
=== A-L ===
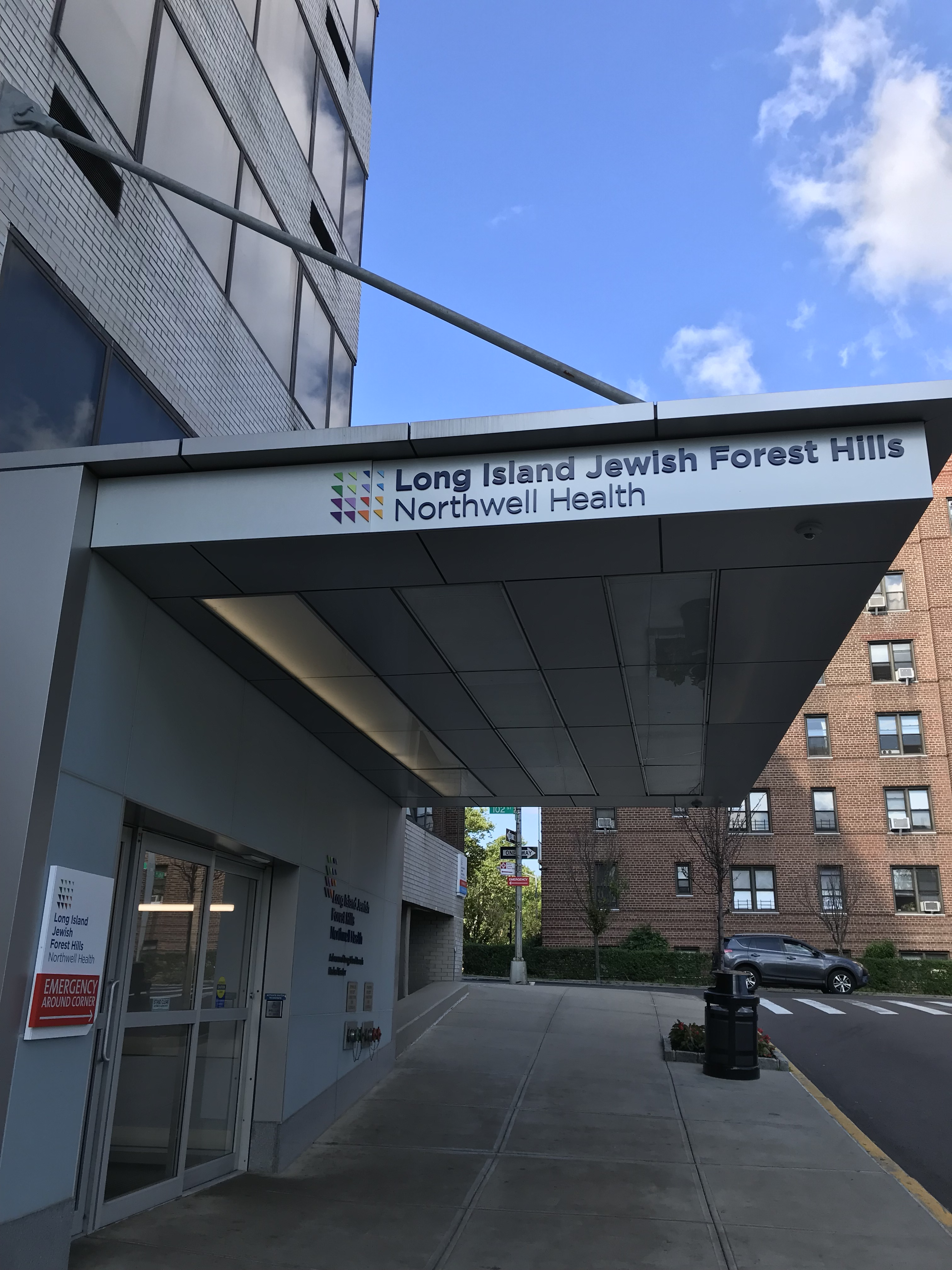
66th Avenue entrance of Long Island Jewish Forest Hills

- Cohen Children's Medical Center - 270-05 76th Avenue, New Hyde Park (on the border of Queens and Nassau Counties - in Glen Oaks, Queens and Lake Success, Nassau County, with a New Hyde Park mailing address).
- Creedmoor Psychiatric Center, 79-25 Winchester Boulevard, Queens Village, Queens.
- Elmhurst Hospital Center, 79-01 Broadway, Elmhurst, Queens. Opened as Elmhurst General Hospital on March 18, 1957.
- The Floating Hospital, 41-40 27th Street, Long Island City, Queens. Founded in 1872 or 1873.
- Flushing Hospital Medical Center, 4500 Parsons Boulevard, Flushing, Queens. Founded as Flushing Hospital in 1884, opened in 1888.
- Jamaica Hospital Medical Center, Van Wyck Expressway at 89th Avenue, Jamaica, Queens. Opened at Fulton (now Jamaica) Avenue and Canal (now 169th) Street on July 28, 1891, incorporated on February 20, 1892, moved to the east side of New York Avenue just north of South Street on June 18, 1898, moved to Van Wyck Boulevard on August 16, 1924.
- Long Island Jewish Forest Hills, 102-01 66th Road, Forest Hills, Queens. Opened as Forest Hills General Hospital on August 13, 1953, closed in November 1963, and re-opened in 1964 as LaGuardia Hospital. Sold in 1996 and renamed Forest Hills Hospital, currently part of Northwell Health.
- Long Island Jewish Medical Center, 270-05 76th Avenue, New Hyde Park (on the border of Queens and Nassau Counties - in Glen Oaks, Queens and Lake Success, Nassau County, with a New Hyde Park mailing address).

=== M-Z ===
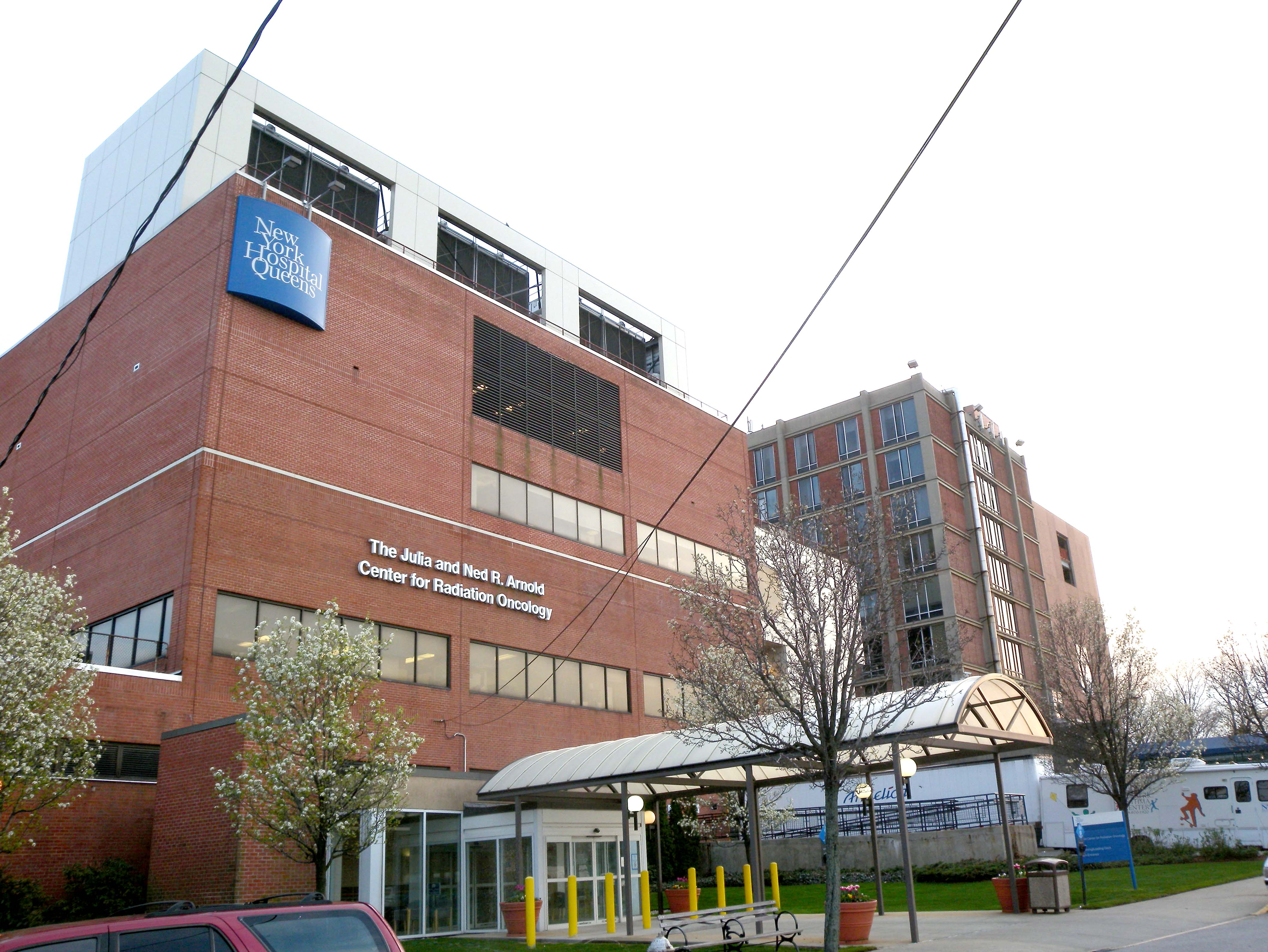
The former Booth Memorial Hospital in Flushing, now New York Presbyterian-Queens

- Mount Sinai Queens, 25-10 30th Avenue, Astoria Queens. Formerly called Astoria General Hospital, opened on Flushing Avenue on November 1, 1892, moved to Crescent Street on May 4, 1896, gradually expanded to 30th Avenue, renamed Western Queens Community Hospital, acquired by Mount Sinai Hospital, and renamed Mount Sinai Queens on June 24, 1999.
- NewYork–Presbyterian/Queens, 56-45 Main Street, at Booth Memorial Avenue, Flushing, Queens. Founded by the Salvation Army as the Rescue Home for Women on East 123rd Street in Manhattan in 1892, moved to 316 East 15th Street and renamed Red Cross Medical Station no. 1 in 1917, renamed for William Booth as Booth Memorial Hospital on March 13, 1919, moved to its current address in Queens on February 5, 1957, renamed New York Hospital Medical Center of Queens when it affiliated with New York Hospital in 1993, renamed NewYork-Presbyterian/Queens upon the merger of New York and Presbyterian Hospitals in 1997.
- Queens Hospital Center, 82-68 164th Street, Jamaica, Queens. Opened as Queens General Hospital on October 30, 1935, renamed upon its merger with Queensboro Hospital and Hospital for Tuberculosis on June 6, 1952, and moved to its current location across 164th Street in 2001.
- St. John's Episcopal Hospital South Shore, 327 Beach 19th Street, Far Rockaway, Queens. Opened as St. Joseph's Hospital on June 25, 1905, became the South Shore Division of Long Island Jewish Hospital in January 1973, renamed St. John's Episcopal Hospital South Shore on July 1, 1976.
- St. Mary's Children's Hospital, 29-01 216th Street, Bayside, Queens. Founded in Manhattan in 1870, moved to Queens in 1951.
- Zucker Hillside Hospital, 75-59 263rd Street, Glen Oaks, Queens. Founded as Hastings Hillside Hospital in Hastings-on Hudson in June 1926. Moved and opened at its current address as Hillside Hospital on October 19, 1941. Renamed Zucker Hillside Hospital in honor of Donald and Barbara Zucker, who made a substantial donation in 1999.

== Closed hospitals ==
Includes former names of hospitals

=== A-G ===
- Astoria General Hospital, 25-10 30th Avenue, Astoria, Queens. See Mount Sinai Queens Hospital, in the section on hospitals in Queens above.
- Astoria Sanitarium, 30-15 Crescent Street, Astoria. Also known as Daly's Astoria Sanitarium. Purchased from Dr. Daly in 1949, renamed Astoria General Hospital. Affiliated with Mount Sinai in 1993.
- Booth Memorial Hospital, Flushing, Queens. See New York-Presbyterian/Queens Hospital, in the section on hospitals in Queens above.
- Boulevard Hospital, 46-04 31st Avenue, Astoria, Queens. Now private medical offices.
- Deepdale General Hospital, 55-15 Little Neck Parkway, Little Neck, Queens. Built in 1959. Renamed Little Neck Hospital in 1991, closed in 1996. Now senior housing.
- Doctor's Hospital of Queens, 104-20 Van Wyck Expressway, Jamaica, Queens.

=== H-K ===
- Grant General Hospital, Willett's Point, Queens.
- Hillcrest General Hospital, 158-40 79th Ave, Flushing, Queens, now a chemical drug dependency facility called Cornerstone Medical Arts Center.
- Hillside Hospital. Founded as Hastings Hillside Hospital in Hastings-on Hudson in June 1926. Moved and opened at its current address as Hillside Hospital on October 19, 1941. Renamed Zucker Hillside Hospital in honor of Donald and Barbara Zucker, who made a substantial donation in 1999. (not to be confused with Hillside Sanitarium)
- Hillside Sanitarium, 175-10 88th Avenue, Jamaica, Queens. Opened on Jan 4, 1926, closed August 15, 1931.
- Holliswood Hospital, 87-37 Palermo Street, Hollis, Queens. Closed August 12, 2013. Founded as Terrace Heights Hospital (1949–1986) .
- Horace Harding Hospital, 90-02 Queens Boulevard, Elmhurst, Queens. Renamed St. John's Hospital, closed in March 2009.
- Howard Beach General Hospital, 155-55 Cross Bay Boulevard, Queens. 225 beds. Opened in 1962. Decades later became a facility for developmentally disabled. Converted to senior apartments in 2012.
- Interfaith Hospital of Queens, 175-10 88th Avenue, Jamaica. 60-beds. Opened 1963. Closed 1973.
- Irwin Sanitarium. In the 1970s, listed in WP:RS as Irwin Nursing Home, 109-43 Farmers Blvd, Hollis/St. Albans, Queens.
- Kew Gardens General Hospital, 80-02 Kew Gardens Road, Queens. Founded in 1941 in a former hotel. Closed in 1978, torn down in 1982, replaced by a 12-story office tower.

=== L-N ===
- LaGuardia Hospital, 102-01 66th Road, Forest Hills, Queens. Operated under that name 1964–1996, now part of Northwell Health. Prior to and after this period it had the names Forest Hills Hospital and Forest Hills General Hospital, now Long Island Jewish Forest Hills.
- Lefferts Maternity Hospital, 104-37 Lefferts Blvd, Richmond Hill.
- Little Neck Hospital, 55-15 Little Neck Parkway, Little Neck, Queens. Closed in 1996. Now senior housing.
- Mary Immaculate Hospital, 152–11 89th Avenue, Jamaica, Queens. Founded in 1902, closed in February 2009.
- Memorial Hospital of Queens, 175-10 88th Avenue, Flushing.
- Midland General Hospital, 175-10 88th Avenue, Jamaica. Opened in the 1920s and closed in 1963.
- Neponsit Beach Hospital for Children, Neponsit, Queens.
- Neponsit Hospital, Beach 149th Street, Neponsit, Queens. Opened in 1915, closed April 21, 1955.

=== P-Q ===
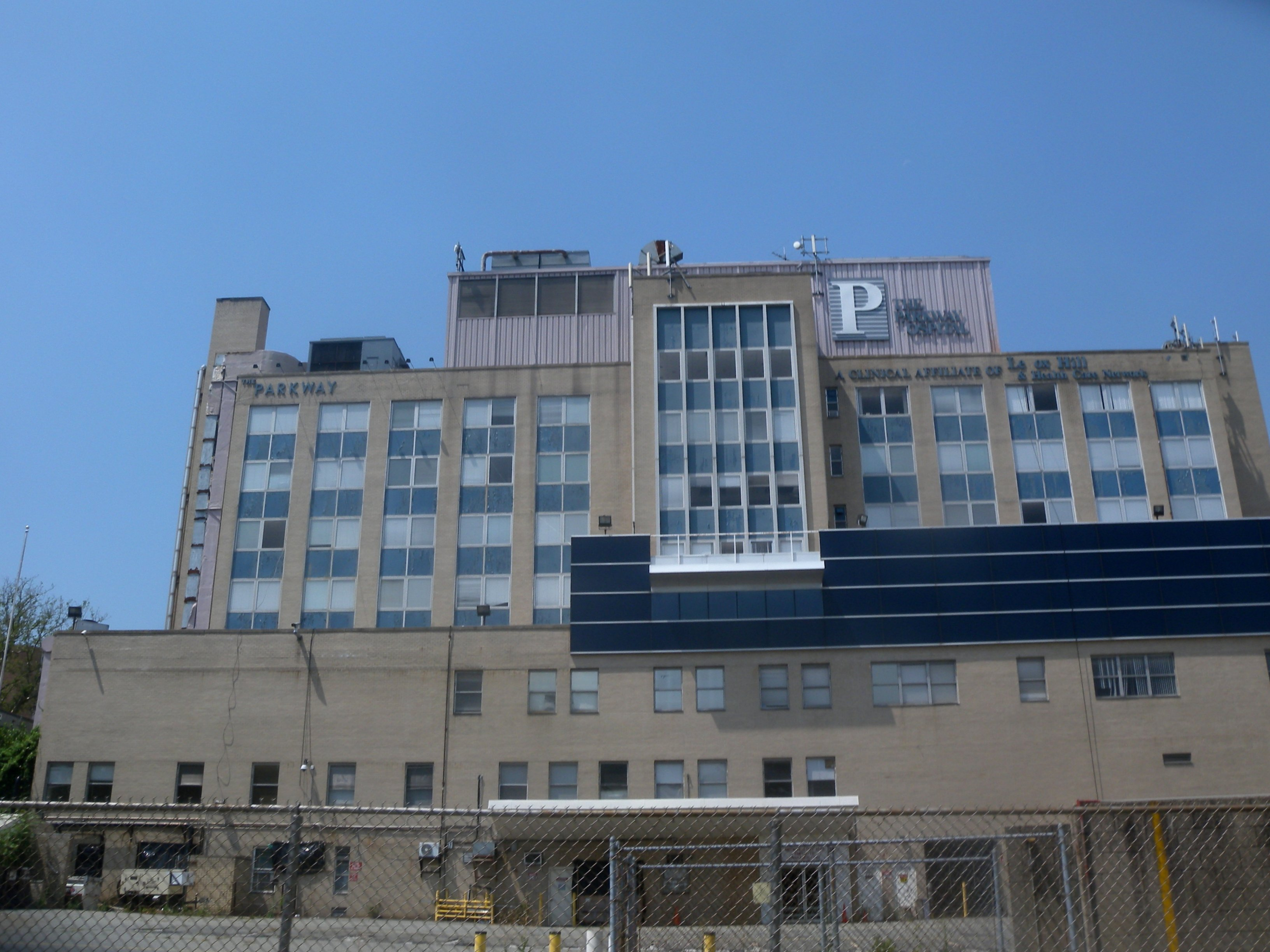
Parkway Hospital

- Parkway Hospital, 70-35 113th Street, Forest Hills, Queens. Opened on May 31, 1963, and closed in late 2008. In 2016 plans were announced for 70 senior and up to 220 market-rate apartments.
- Parsons Hospital, 35-06 Parsons Boulevard, Flushing, Queens. Merged with Flushing Hospital.
- Peninsula Hospital, 51-15 Beach Channel Drive, Far Rockaway, Queens. Opened as Rockaway Beach Hospital at 152 Beach 85th Street in Far Rockaway, Queens, on April 30, 1911, renamed Peninsula Hospital and moved to 51-15 Beach Channel Drive on June 12, 1960, and closed in April 2012. Since 2014, an extended care and rehabilitation center.
- Physicians Hospital, 34-01 73rd Street, Jackson Heights, Queens. Opened in 1935, and closed in 1990. Renamed Jackson Heights Hospital, it closed in 1996. Junior High School 230 was built on site in 1998.
- Queens General Hospital, Jamaica, Queens. Opened on October 30, 1935, renamed Queens Hospital Center upon its merger with Queensboro and Triboro Hospitals on June 6, 1952.
- Queens Memorial Hospital, Queens.
- Queens Village Sanitarium, Queens.
- Queensboro Hospital, Flushing Avenue and Lotts Lane, Queens. Opened in 1916, became the Queensboro Pavilion of Queens Hospital Center upon its merger with Queens General and Triboro Hospitals on June 6, 1952.

=== R-S ===
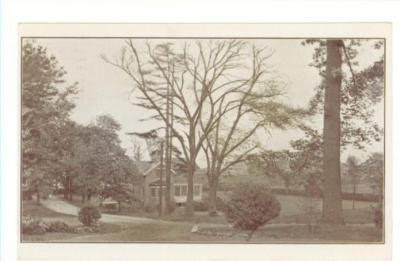
River Crest Sanitarium: postcard image

- Richmond Hill Sanitarium, 95-02 121st Street, Richmond Hill, Queens.
- River Crest Sanitarium, a New York State licensed mental hospital located in Astoria, Queens. Closed by 1961, replaced by a private high school.
- Rockaway Beach Hospital, 152 Beach 85th Street, Queens. Opened on April 30, 1911, renamed Peninsula Hospital, and moved to 51-15 Beach Channel Drive on June 12, 1960, closed in April 2012.
- St. Albans Sanitarium, Queens.
- St. Anthony's Hospital, 89-15 Woodhaven Boulevard, Woodhaven, Queens. Founded in 1914, closed in 1966. Private homes were built on the property in 2000.
- St. John's Long Island City Hospital, 25-01 Jackson Avenue, Long Island City, Queens. Founded in 1890, replaced by One Court Square.
- St. John's Queens Hospital, 90-02 Queens Boulevard, Elmhurst, Queens. Closed in February 2009. Sold in 2014 for conversion to apartments.
- St. Joseph's Hospital, 158-40 79th Avenue, Flushing, Queens. Formerly Hillcrest General Hospital. As of 2007, a chemical drug dependency facility called Cornerstone Medical Arts Center.
- St. Joseph's Hospital, 327 Beach 19th Street, Far Rockaway, Queens. See St. John's Episcopal Hospital South Shore, in the section on hospitals in Queens above.
- Springfield Sanitarium, 220-23 137th Avenue, Springfield Gardens, Queens.

=== T-Z ===
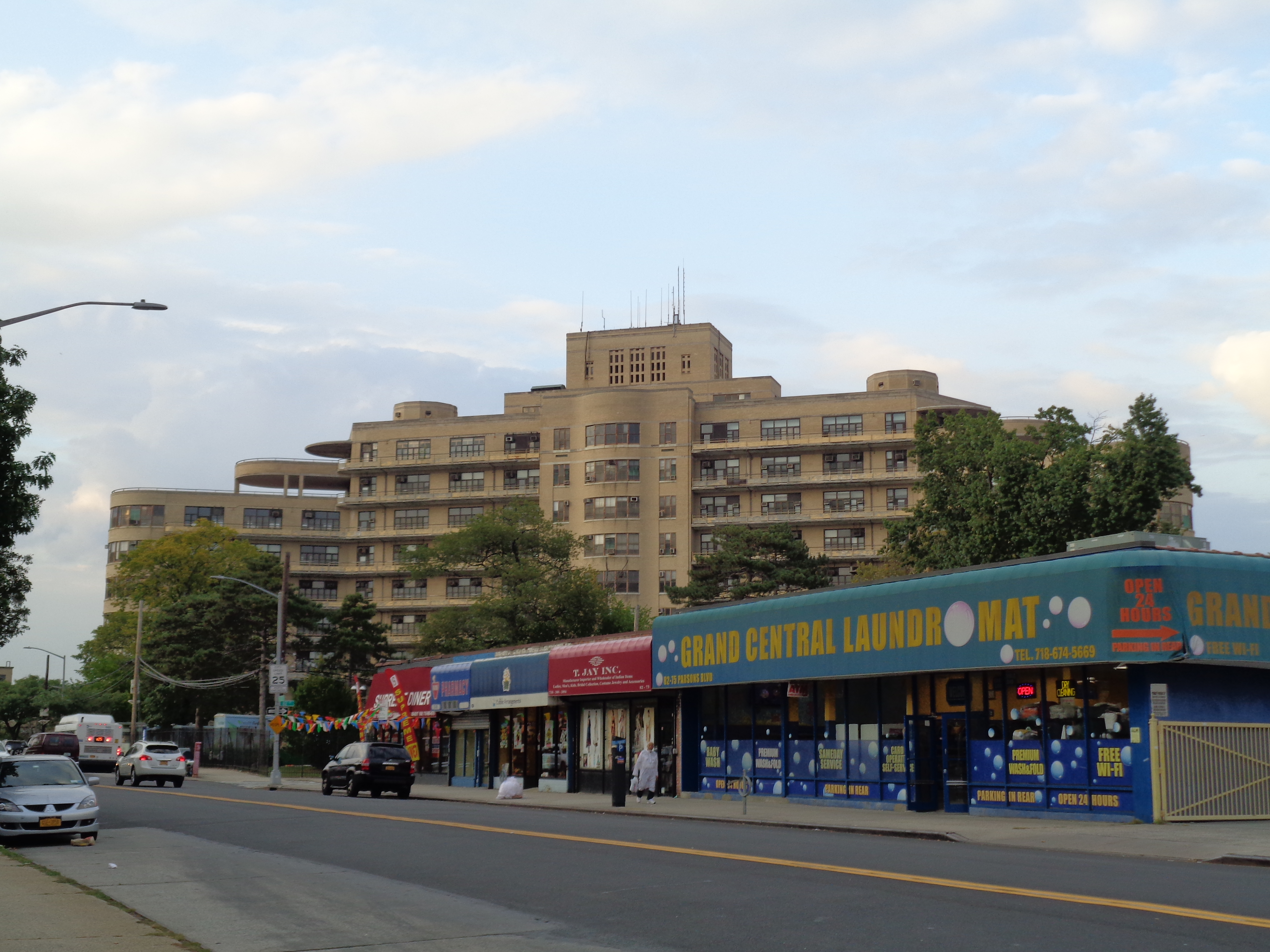
Triboro Hospital overlooking the surrounding neighborhood

- Terrace Heights Hospital, 87-37 Palermo Street, Hollis, Queens. Opened in 1949. Renamed Holliswood Hospital in 1986. Closed on August 12, 2013.
- Triboro Hospital for Tuberculosis, Parsons Boulevard and 82nd Drive, Jamaica, Queens. Opened on January 23, 1941, merged with Queens General and Queensboro Hospitals to form Queens Hospital Center on June 6, 1952, and closed in 1984. The building stands vacant.
- Van Wyck Hospital, 104-26 Van Wyck Boulevard, Queens.
- Whitestone Hospital, 166th Street at 12th Avenue, Whitestone, Queens. Closed in 1979, replaced by garden apartments.

== See also ==
- List of hospitals in New York (state)
  - List of hospitals in New York City
    - List of hospitals in the Bronx
    - List of hospitals in Brooklyn
    - List of hospitals in Manhattan
    - List of hospitals in Staten Island
