= Booth Memorial Hospital Cleveland =

Geography
- Location: Cleveland, Ohio, United States
- Coordinates: 41°33′06″N 81°33′07″W

Services
- Beds: 54

History
- Closed: 1991

Links
- Lists: Hospitals in Ohio

Booth Memorial Hospital of Cleveland was a short-term hospital in Cleveland, Ohio, United States. It was closed on November 30, 1991. At the time of closing, it had 54 beds and 132.75 full-time equivalent staff members.

There were numerous hospitals throughout the United States and Canada that operated under the Booth Memorial name. They were operated by The Salvation Army in locations such as New York City (now NewYork–Presbyterian/Queens), Chicago, Omaha, and Montreal among many others. The hospitals offered services for unwed mothers and others who wanted to seek adoption of their children.
