= Little Neck Hospital =

Former hospital in Queens, New York

Coordinates: 40°45′55″N 73°43′26″W

Little Neck Hospital, also known as Little Neck Community Hospital, Deepdale Hospital, and Deepdale General Hospital all referred to a 185-bed facility at the same address on Little Neck Parkway in Little Neck, Queens, New York City. It opened in 1959 as Deepdale, was renamed in 1991, and closed in 1996. By the time it closed, this hospital was operating as a division of Flushing Hospital Medical Center; the latter was acquired by New York Hospital in April 1996.

== History ==
Deepdale, which opened in 1959, had a program for training nursing students from a local college. The hospital was bought by Preferred Health Network in 1991, and in 1993 New York State's Department of Health made it known that it was planning on "eventually closing Deepdale." The hospital closed in 1996, and its building was purchased in 1999 for conversion into an assisted living facility.

== Controversy ==
They were fined after being charged by New York State's Attorney General with illegally overcharging patients for telephone service. The accusation said it was a "deceptive and unconscionable business act." A larger fine was imposed for two situations involving "improper medical procedures" (both fatal).

In 1973, a nearly two hour power loss was compounded because "its emergency generator was inoperative and the Fire Department was called to provide a portable power supply."
