= Amy O'Sullivan =

American ER nurse

Amy O'Sullivan is an Emergency Room nurse at Wyckoff Heights Medical Center in Brooklyn who appeared on the cover of Time (magazine) in 2020 for the 100 most influential people issue. She treated the hospital’s first COVID-19 patient. Mattel created a Barbie doll in her likeness.

== Career ==
O’Sullivan has been a nurse since 1992, having studied nursing at the Borough of Manhattan Community College, earning an Associates Degree in Nursing.
