= Blankfein =

Blankfein is a surname. Notable people with the surname include:

- Lloyd Blankfein (born 1954), American investment banker
- Jules Blankfein (died 1989), American physician and financier, uncle of Lloyd
