= NewYork-Presbyterian Queens =

Hospital in Queens, New York

- NewYork–Presbyterian Healthcare System
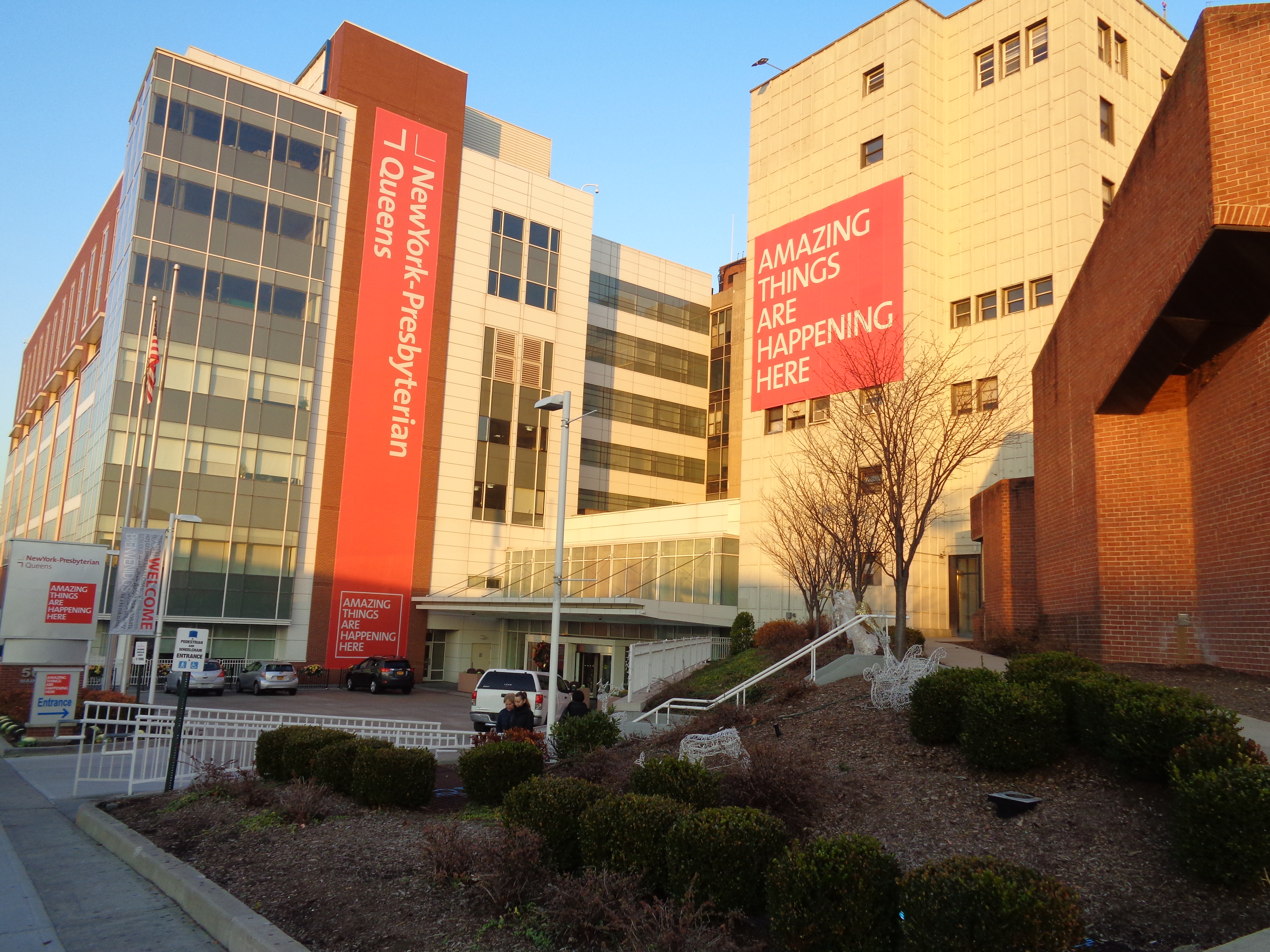
- The hospital in December 2015

Geography
- Location: 56-45 Main Street; Flushing, New York, United States
- Coordinates: 40.747156°N 73.825599°W

Organization
- Type: Teaching
- Affiliated university: Weill Cornell Medical College

Services
- Emergency department: Level I trauma center
- Beds: 535

History
- Founded: 1892 (as Rescue Home for Women); March 13, 1919 (as Booth Memorial Hospital (Manhattan)); February 6, 1957 (as Booth Memorial Hospital (Queens)); May 1993 (as New York Hospital Queens); July 1, 2015 (as NewYork-Presbyterian/Queens)

Links
- Website: www.nyp.org/queens
- Lists: Hospitals in New York State
- Other links: Hospitals in Queens

NewYork-Presbyterian Queens, stylized as NewYork-Presbyterian/Queens (NYP/Q or NYP/Queens), is a not-for-profit acute care and teaching hospital affiliated with Weill Cornell Medicine in the Flushing neighborhood of Queens in New York City. Formerly operating as Booth Memorial Hospital and New York Hospital Queens (NYHQ), it is located on the northeast corner of Main Street and Booth Memorial Avenue.

The hospital was formed in 1892 as the Rescue Home for Women, becoming known as Booth Memorial Hospital in 1919. The current Queens campus opened in 1957. The NewYork–Presbyterian Healthcare System had assumed control of the Booth Memorial Hospital until 2015, when the NewYork–Presbyterian Hospital, headquartered in Manhattan, assumed control and made the Booth Memorial Hospital a Queens campus.

== History ==
The hospital began as a non-profit hospital in Manhattan operated by the Salvation Army called Booth Memorial Hospital and Medical Center, one of several Salvation Army hospitals around the United States to bear the "Booth Memorial Hospital" name. It was named after Salvation Army founder William Booth. It was originally opened in 1892 as a rescue home for women, particularly unmarried mothers, located at East 123rd Street in East Harlem. After several location changes, it was moved to 312–20 East 15th Street (also referred to as 314 and 316 East 15th Street) on the East Side in the 1910s in a joint venture with the American Red Cross, when it was officially named Booth Memorial Hospital. It was licensed as a general-care hospital in 1918. The facility was expanded throughout the decade, officially dedicated on March 13, 1919. It was located across from Stuyvesant Square, at the site of the modern Mount Sinai Beth Israel hospital.

Groundbreaking ceremonies on the hospital's current location in Queensboro Hill, in Flushing, occurred on June 24, 1954. The Salvation Army moved the hospital due to lack of medical facilities in the burgeoning borough of Queens, and after failing to develop the former New York Orthopedic Hospital in Midtown, on East 59th Street and First Avenue just south of the Queensboro Bridge, into a replacement. It was dedicated and opened on February 5, 1957. Built at a cost of $4.8 million, this modern facility featured 210 beds at the time of its opening. The hospital was accredited by the Joint Commission on Accreditation of Hospitals in 1958. Around this time, North Hempstead Turnpike was renamed Booth Memorial Avenue. The former Manhattan site was purchased by the New York Infirmary. The women's rescue home was moved to a wing in the new hospital, called the Perkins Pavilion.

Booth Memorial became affiliated with the New York University School of Medicine. In 1992, the hospital was purchased from the Salvation Army by New York Hospital in Manhattan, becoming New York Hospital Queens in May 1993. After New York Hospital merged with Presbyterian Hospital in 1997, it became part of the NewYork–Presbyterian Healthcare System. For some time in the 1990s, the hospital managed nearby Flushing Hospital Medical Center, the oldest hospital in the borough, due to financial struggles. After Booth Memorial considered closing the neighbor hospital, the latter was transferred by United States bankruptcy court to Jamaica Hospital in March 1999, and Flushing Hospital emerged from bankruptcy in June 2000.

In February 2015, New York–Presbyterian announced plans to assume full control of New York Hospital Queens. On July 1, 2015, the complex was renamed NewYork–Presbyterian/Queens, making it New York–Presbyterian's first Queens campus and its sixth campus overall.

== Facilities ==
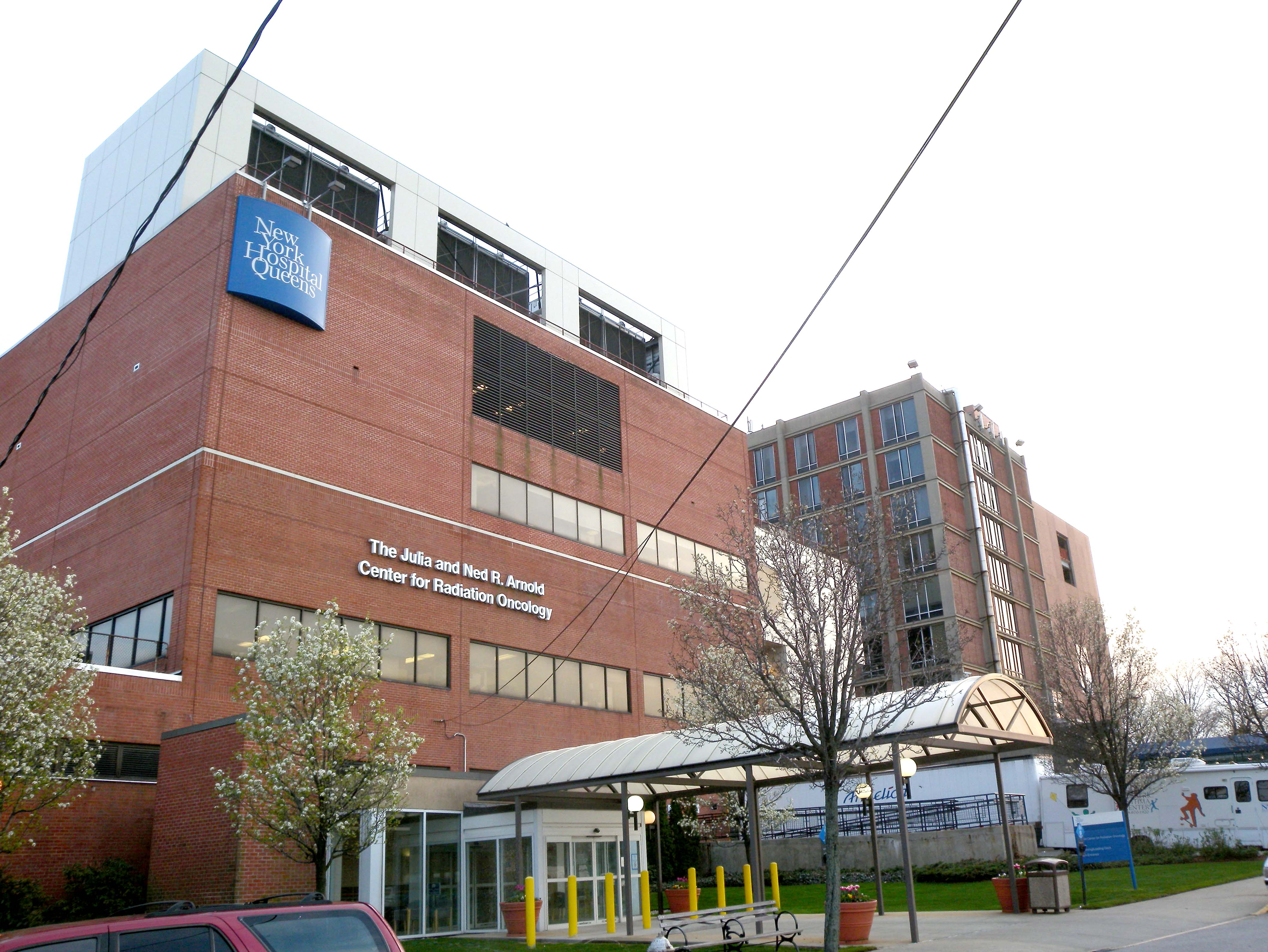
The Center for Radiation Oncology at the north end of the campus.

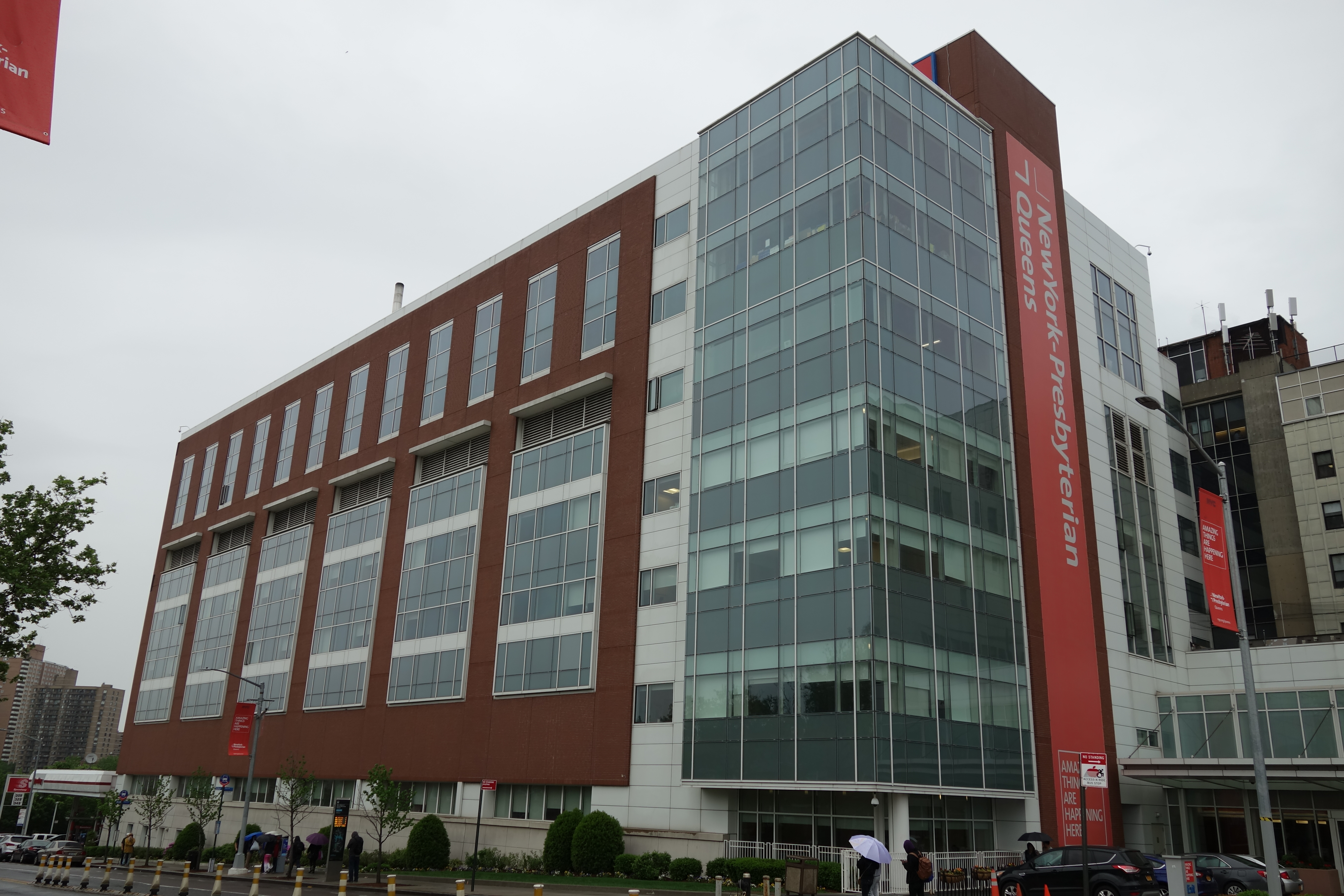
The West Wing building, opened in 2010.

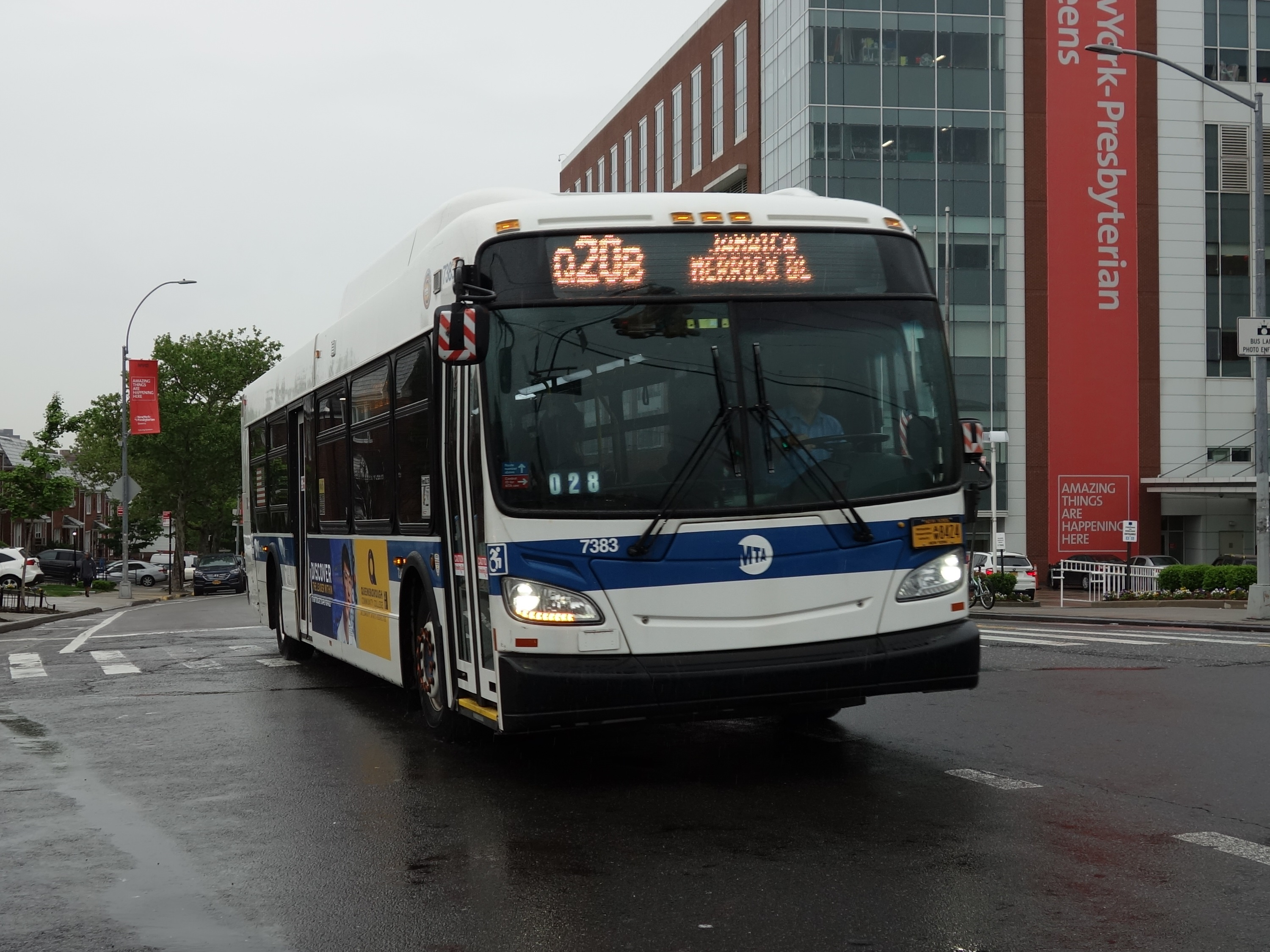
A Jamaica-bound Q20B bus passing by the hospital on Main Street.

The hospital is located on a large block bound by Main Street, Booth Memorial Avenue, 141st Street, and 56th Avenue. It consists of five multi-story buildings, with a parking lot located across Booth Memorial Avenue. The main entrance and lobby are located on Main Street at the southwest end of the block, while the emergency entrance is located on Booth Memorial. The only non-hospital structure on the block is a Speedway LLC filling station (formerly branded as a Hess Corporation station) on the northwest corner, which is currently being demolished and turned into a parking lot.

In 1999, a major modernization project took place, adding 200 beds to the hospital. A second major expansion of the facility was approved by Queens Community Board 7 in September 2006, leading to the construction of the current lobby building and a new West Wing building. Groundbreaking on the project took place on February 9, 2007. The West Wing opened in 2010. A new parking garage, either on the current parking lot or on property taken from nearby Kissena Corridor Park, was proposed, but has yet to be constructed. In 2012, the hospital installed a half-acre of green roof with funding from the New York City Department of Environmental Protection.

In addition to the main facility, several other facilities, including primary and specialty care facilities, are located across Queens, particularly in nearby Flushing and Fresh Meadows.

=== Transportation ===
The hospital is served by the Q20 and Q44 SBS buses, which run along Main Street. The closest subway station is Flushing–Main Street at Roosevelt Avenue in Downtown Flushing, served by the 7 and <7> trains.

== Notable deaths ==
The following notable individuals have died at this hospital:

- Jan August (1904–1976), pianist and xylophonist
- Ray Bryant (1931–2011), jazz pianist
- Ron Carey (1936–2008), labor leader − lung cancer
- Aram Haigaz (1900–1986), Armenian writer
- Kivie Kaplan (1904–1975), Jewish-American activist, then-president of the NAACP − heart attack
- Bernard Lander (1915–2010), rabbi, president of Touro College − congestive heart failure
- Donald Manes (1934–1986), former Queens Borough President − self-inflicted knife wound
- Frank D. O'Connor (1909–1992), lawyer, judge and politician − head trauma
- Mark Olf (1905–1987), Yiddish and Hebrew folksinger − leukemia
- Philip Rastelli (1918–1991), former boss of the Bonanno crime family − liver cancer
- Izzy Slapawitz (1948–2019), wrestler
- Modest Stein (1871–1958), artist
- Hope Stevens (1905–1982), African American lawyer and activist, former co-chairman of National Conference of Black Lawyers − heart attack

== Notable faculty ==
Notable former faculty include:

- Dr. James Rahal, director of infectious diseases division and professor at Weill Cornell Medical College from 1988 to 2010. Expert on West Nile virus and drug resistance.

== See also ==
- Booth Memorial Hospital, a separate former Salvation Army hospital in Cleveland, Ohio
- List of hospitals in New York City
