= St. John's Episcopal Hospital South Shore =

Hospital in Far Rockaway, Queens, New York, US

Coordinates: 40.59860°N 73.75258°W

Geography
- Location: Far Rockaway, Queens, New York, United States

Organization
- Type: General
- Network: Episcopal Health Services

Services
- Emergency department: Yes
- Beds: 252

History
- Opened: 1905

Links
- Lists: Hospitals in New York State
- Other links: List of hospitals in Queens

St. John's Episcopal Hospital South Shore opened as St. Joseph's Hospital on June 25, 1905, became the South Shore Division of Long Island Jewish Hospital in January 1973, and was renamed St. John's Episcopal Hospital South Shore on July 1, 1976.

== History ==
During the 3 1/2 years that Long Island Jewish operated South Shore, Peninsula Hospital attempted to take over this Far Rockaway hospital.

Regarding the need for a replacement for the century-old hospital The New York Times wrote in 1976 that a clash between "officials said they could not continue to operate in the old structure" and voters who "feared a new hospital would bring too many people and cars into their community" resulted in a takeover by another group. A proposed closing was avoided via a takeover by a related hospital group. A bankruptcy filed in 1999 by that group resulted in selling one of the group's hospitals.

In 1987 the 300-bed hospital installed a dairy kosher kitchen.

Peninsula Hospital, which in 2006 a state agency wanted St. Johns to absorb, closed in 2012. This closing left St. John's, whose emergency room "was last renovated in the 1960s" as the only hospital in Far Rockaway.

== Designations ==
- Primary Stroke Center
- Level II Perinatal Center
