= Union Hall Street station =

Train station in New York City (1890–1977)

Union Hall Street
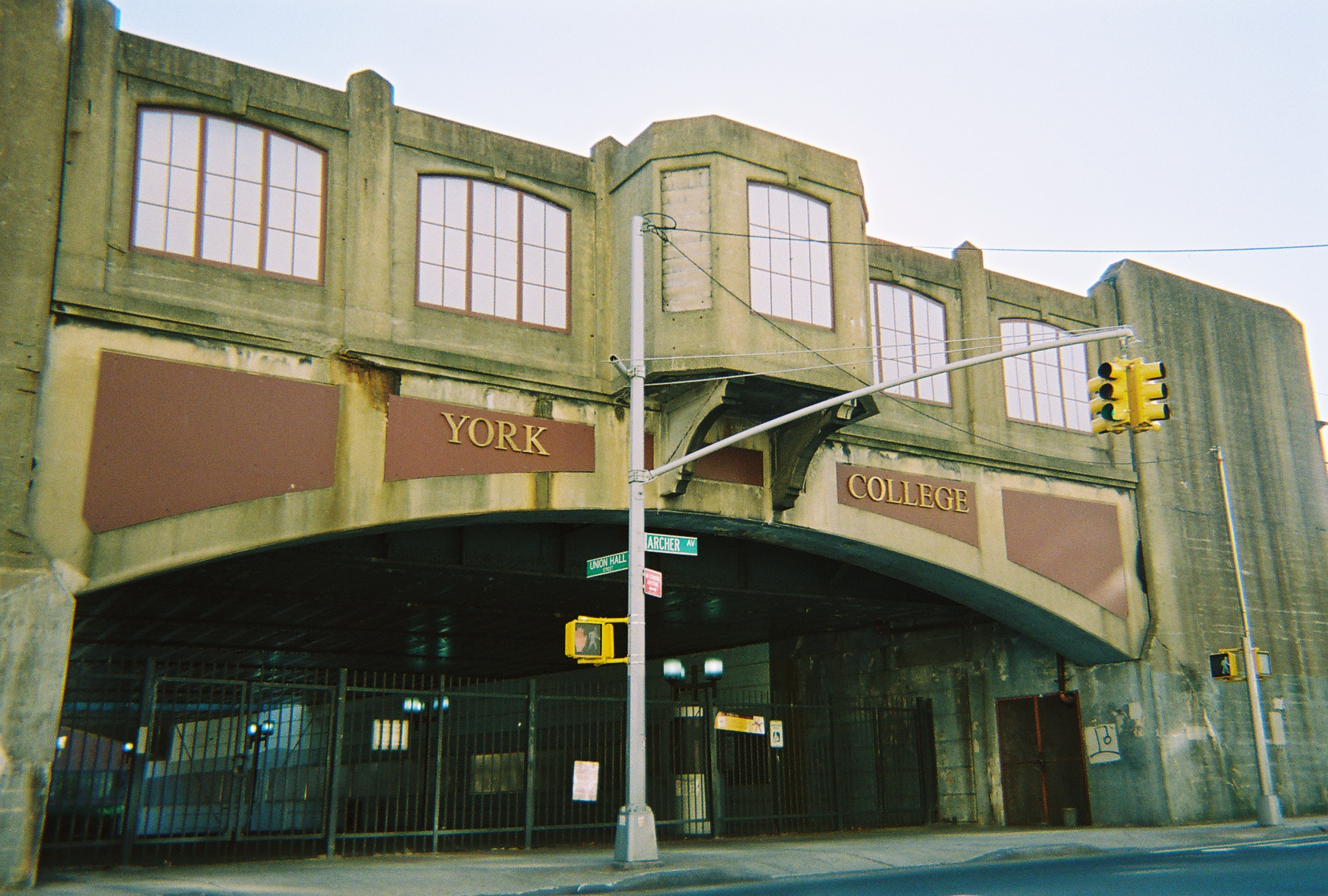
- The facade where Union Hall Street LIRR station used to be, today an entrance to York College (CUNY)

General information
- Location: Archer Avenue and Union Hall Street; Jamaica, Queens, New York
- Coordinates: 40°42′10″N 73°47′49″W
- Owner: Long Island Rail Road
- Lines: Main Line and Montauk Branch

History
- Opened: June 24, 1890
- Closed: 1905 (or 1911), May 20, 1977
- Rebuilt: 1913, 1929–1931 (Grade elimination)
- Electrified: August 29, 1905
- Former names: New York Avenue

Former services
Preceding station	Long Island Rail Road	Following station
Jamaica toward Long Island City or Penn Station	Main Line	Canal Street toward Greenport
Jamaica toward Long Island City	Montauk Division	Canal Street toward Montauk
Location

Union Hall Street was a station on the Long Island Rail Road's Main Line at Union Hall Street, near York College, in Jamaica, Queens, New York City, United States.

== History ==
=== Early history ===
A station opened at New York Avenue (now Guy R. Brewer Boulevard) on June 24, 1890, when the local Atlantic Avenue rapid transit trains were extended from Woodhaven Junction through Jamaica to Rockaway Junction. The station was closed in 1905, but in response to complaints about the reopening of Jamaica station on Sutphin Boulevard (primarily because the downtown core of Jamaica was centered on Union Hall Street, the site of "Old Jamaica"), the LIRR opened a new one a block away at Union Hall Street in 1913, when the tracks through Jamaica were grade-separated. Union Hall Street station was built near the site of the "Old Jamaica station," originally at ground level and eventually elevated between 1929 and 1931.

=== Decline and closure ===
The construction of the newer Jamaica station led to commercial development around Sutphin Boulevard, and as a result, the new station became Jamaica's primary LIRR station. Eventually, the Union Hall Street station's patronage dropped, since it was only half a mile from the station at Sutphin Boulevard.

On May 21, 1973, the LIRR announced plans to significantly reduce service at Union Hall Street, Springfield Gardens, and St. Albans, with only a few trains stopping during rush hours. At Union Hall Street, service was limited to three westbound trains, leaving at 7:27 a.m., 8:39 a.m., and 5:18 p.m., and three eastbound trains, leaving at 9:03 a.m., 5:06 p.m., and 5:39 p.m.

Union Hall Street closed on May 20, 1977. Some people in the area were already under the impression the station was closed. Some time before, wire fences were installed to seal Union Street, which passes under the station, to car traffic. An opening was left to allow people to reach the staircases to the platforms.

In recent years, a decorative wall mimicking a station house was placed over the bridge where the former Union Hall Street station was located. Twelve years after the station closed, the Jamaica Center–Parsons/Archer subway station opened two blocks west of the former Union Hall Street station; the subway station was intended to replace the former 160th Street elevated station a block north on Jamaica Avenue.
