= Whitestone Hospital =

Defunct Queens hospital

Geography
- Location: Whitestone, Queens, New York, United States
- Coordinates: 40.7918°N 73.7977°W

Links
- Lists: Hospitals in New York State
- Other links: List of hospitals in Queens

Whitestone Hospital was a 103-bed general hospital (births, deaths, in-between) with notable patients. It was located in the Whitestone neighborhood of Queens, NY. and built on a property that originally was a farm. A nearby tower from back then has since been landmarked.

The hospital was also known as Whitestone General Hospital.

== History ==
Whitestone was initially operated by one partnership and, beginning 1976, by another. An unsuccessful attempt was made to sell the hospital. They closed in 1979, and the site has been replaced by garden apartments.

== Controversy ==
"An investigation of assertions of questionable practices at Whitestone General Hospital" was based on "the hospital was treating large numbers of cancer patients who normally would have gone to the larger medical centers in Manhattan for treatment." A doctor lost his license over this.

Whitestone was fined $1,000 "for changing partnerships without Public Health Council approval."

False "representations were made by Borinquen University's representatives that the University was affiliated with Whitestone Hospital in New York" in 1977. Part of the case used the name Whitestone General Hospital.

== In fiction ==
Whitestone Hospital was featured in naming fiction titles by writer Ava Reed.
