= Hillside station (LIRR) =

Train station in New York City (closed 1966)

Hillside
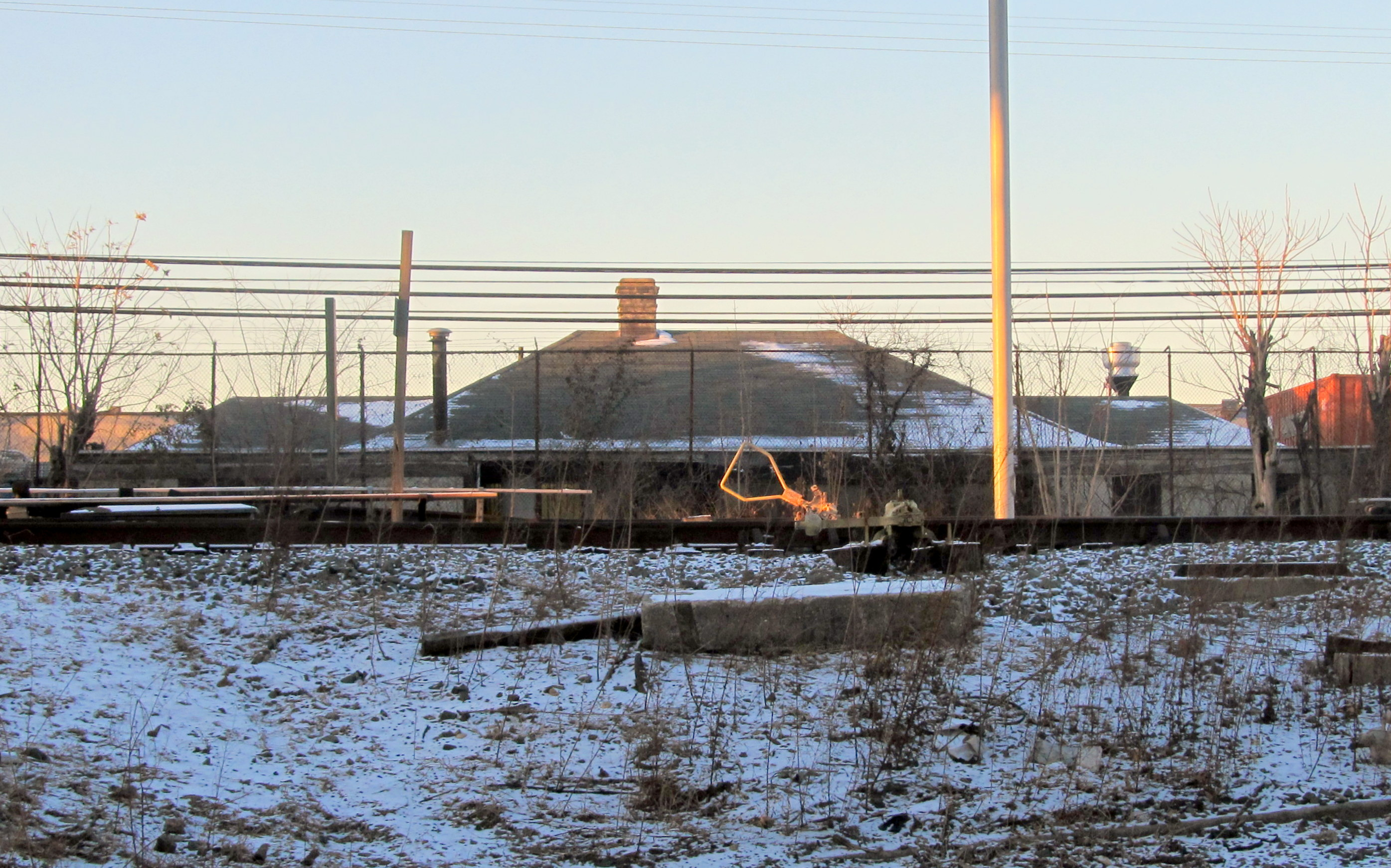
- The former station building in 2017

General information
- Location: 177th Street near 93rd Avenue; Hillside, Queens, New York
- Coordinates: 40.706529°N 73.782715°W
- Owner: Long Island Rail Road
- Lines: Main Line and Montauk Branch

History
- Opened: unknown (c. 1909)
- Closed: July 1, 1966

Former services
Preceding station	Long Island Rail Road	Following station
Canal Street toward Long Island City or Penn Station	Main Line	Rockaway Junction toward Greenport
Canal Street toward Long Island City	Montauk Division	Rockaway Junction toward Montauk
Location

Hillside was a junction and station on the Long Island Rail Road's Main Line and Montauk Branch in Hillside, Queens, New York City, United States. It was located east of where the Montauk Branch now crosses over the two eastbound passenger tracks and the two freight tracks of the Main Line, just west of the Hillside Facility.

== History ==
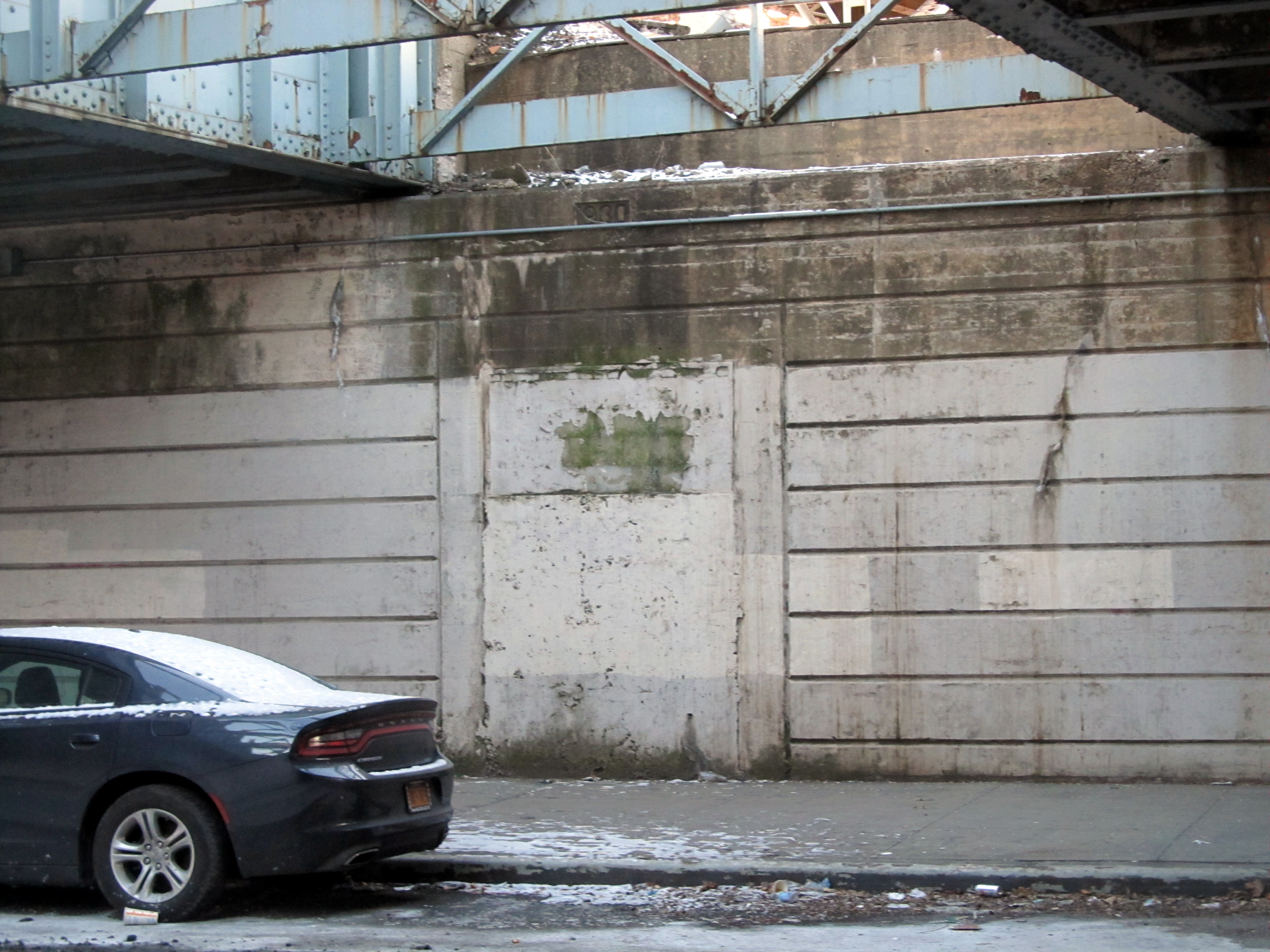
Bricked-off staircase that once led to the platforms

Hillside's opening date is unknown (although it appeared on the November 1909 public timetable), near Rockaway Junction, although the station should not be confused with the station nearby with the same name as the junction. The new station house replaced the old one on May 15, 1911, and the replacement station first appeared in employee timetable #60 on May 14, 1911. On October 1, 1930 the junction was eliminated when the Montauk Branch was elevated. Less than a year later, it was given high-level platforms, staircases, and a bridge over 177th Street as part of a grade elimination project. The station closed on July 1, 1966. By the year 1975, the station building and grounds were used by an ice cream distributor. Twenty-four years after the station closed, the name was revived for the LIRR's Hillside Maintenance Facility, which was located closer to Rockaway Junction site and nearby Holban Yard.
