= Hillside Facility =

Railroad maintenance facility in Queens, New York

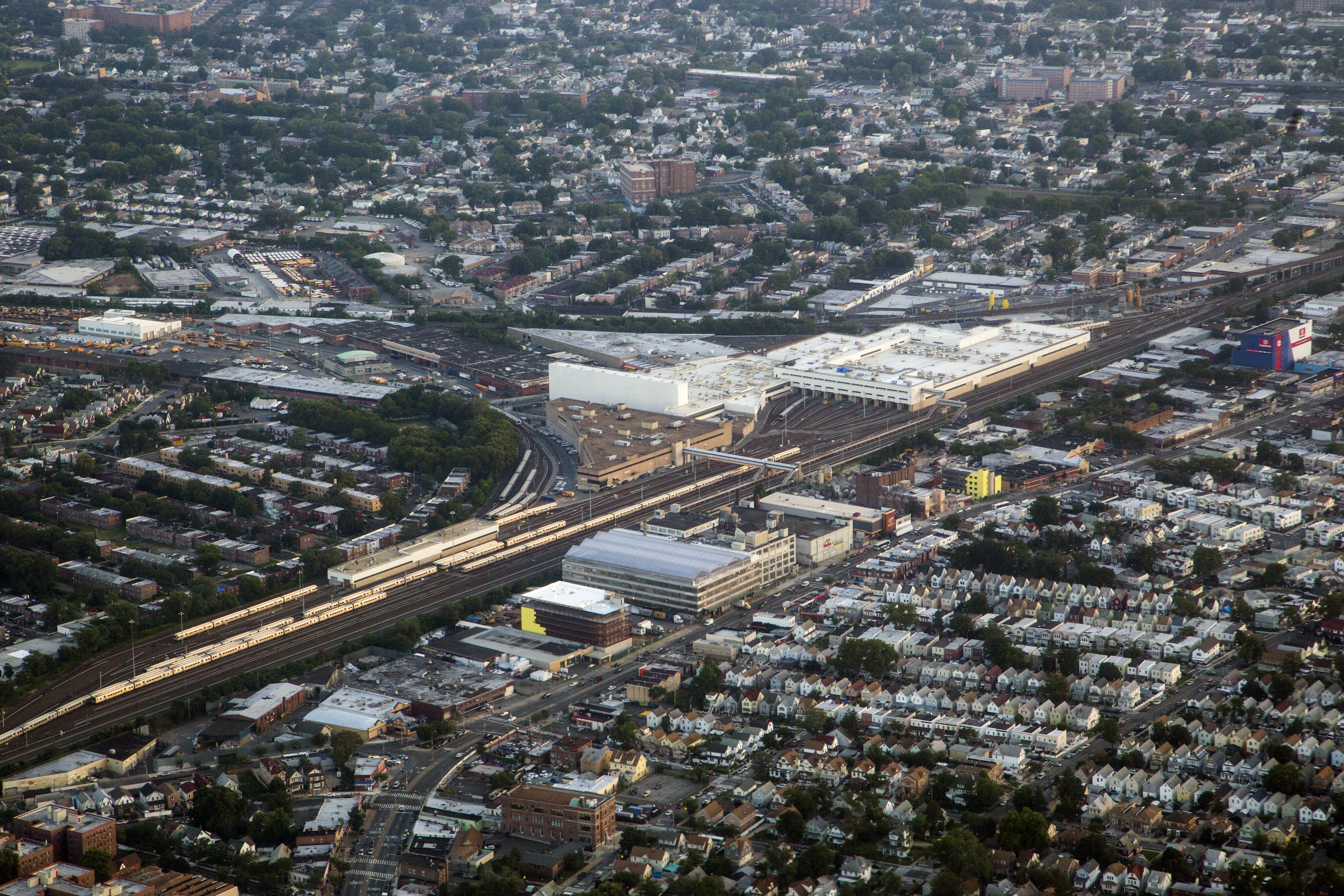
- Aerial view of maintenance facility and adjacent Holban Yard.

General information
- Location: 93-59 183rd Street; Jamaica, Queens, New York
- Coordinates: 40°42′23″N 73°46′40″W
- Line: Main Line
- Platforms: 2 side platforms (LIRR employees only)
- Tracks: 32

Other information
- Station code: HIL

History
- Opened: July 22, 1991
- Electrified: 750 V (DC) third rail
Location

The Hillside Facility, also called the Hillside Support Facility or the Hillside Maintenance Complex, is a maintenance facility of the Long Island Rail Road (LIRR) in Jamaica, Queens, New York City. The Hillside facility was built between 1984 and 1991 on the grounds of a section of Holban Yard, a railroad freight yard. The facility covers 30 acres (120,000 m^{2}) east of the former Hillside station and can maintain 60 cars at a time.

== Main Line station ==
The facility includes an employees-only station which is the first stop along the LIRR Main Line east of Jamaica station. The line is served by select trains on the Hempstead, Ronkonkoma, Oyster Bay, Montauk, and Port Jefferson branches.

Like the Boland's Landing station west of Jamaica, this station is for LIRR employees only. There are two side platforms that serve Tracks 3 and 4 of the Main Line.

== Holban Yard ==
Holban Yard is a railroad freight yard for the Long Island Rail Road at Rockaway Junction near the current site of the Hillside Facility. It was built in 1906 and was named for the two communities of Hollis and St. Albans which bordered the yard along the Cedarhurst Cut-Off at the time of construction. The northernmost segment of the yard extends from the sites of the former Rockaway Junction Station through the grounds of the former Willow Tree Station, which is the present site of the platforms for the Hillside Facility over the 183rd Street bridge, with tracks extending east of the still-operating Hollis Station. It continues to be used to hold work cars, and for work on various other MOW equipment. The yard is also used to store a trio of 1950s vintage Osgood Bradley passenger cars.

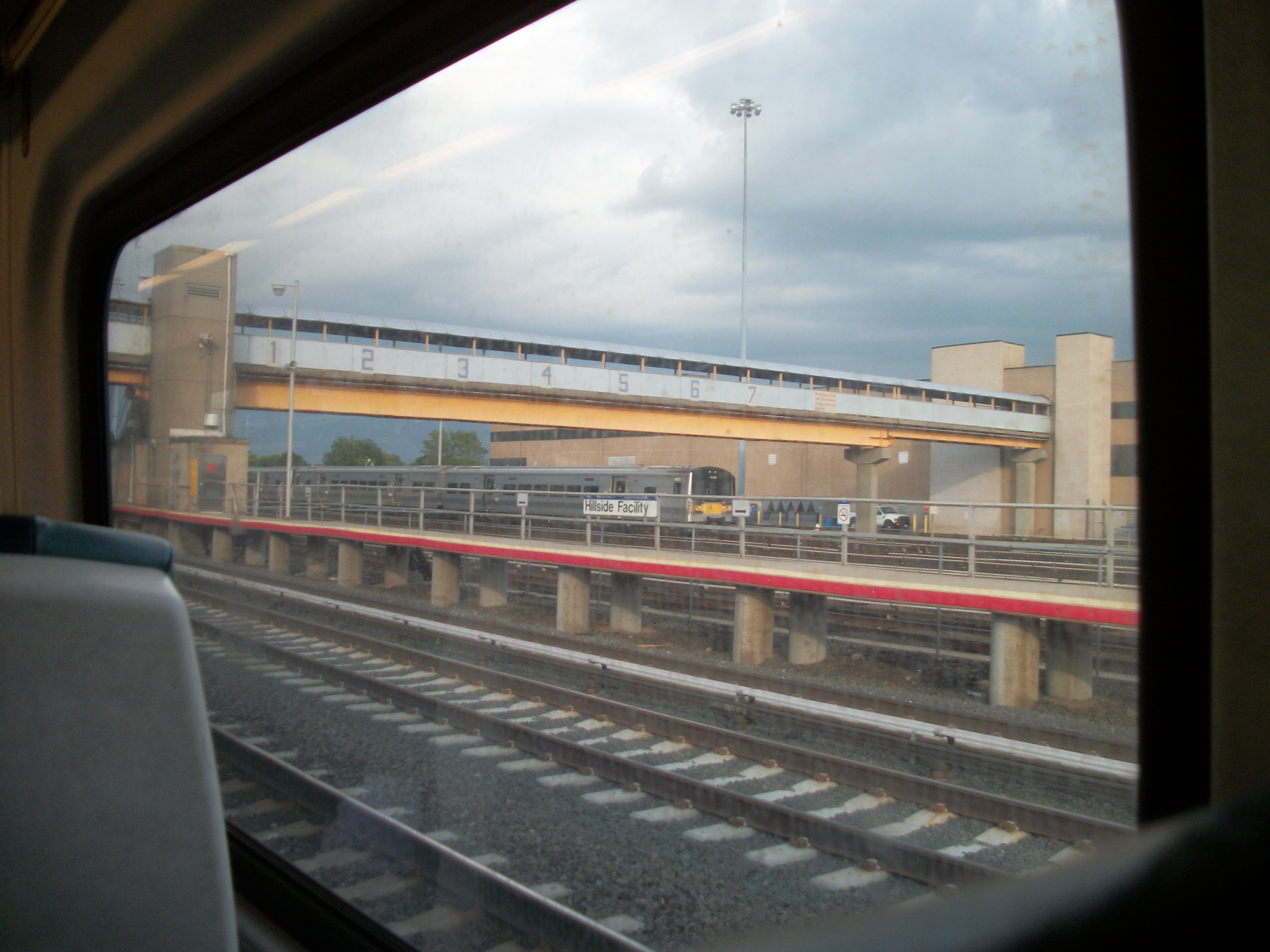
The Hillside Facility as seen from an Atlantic Terminal-bound train

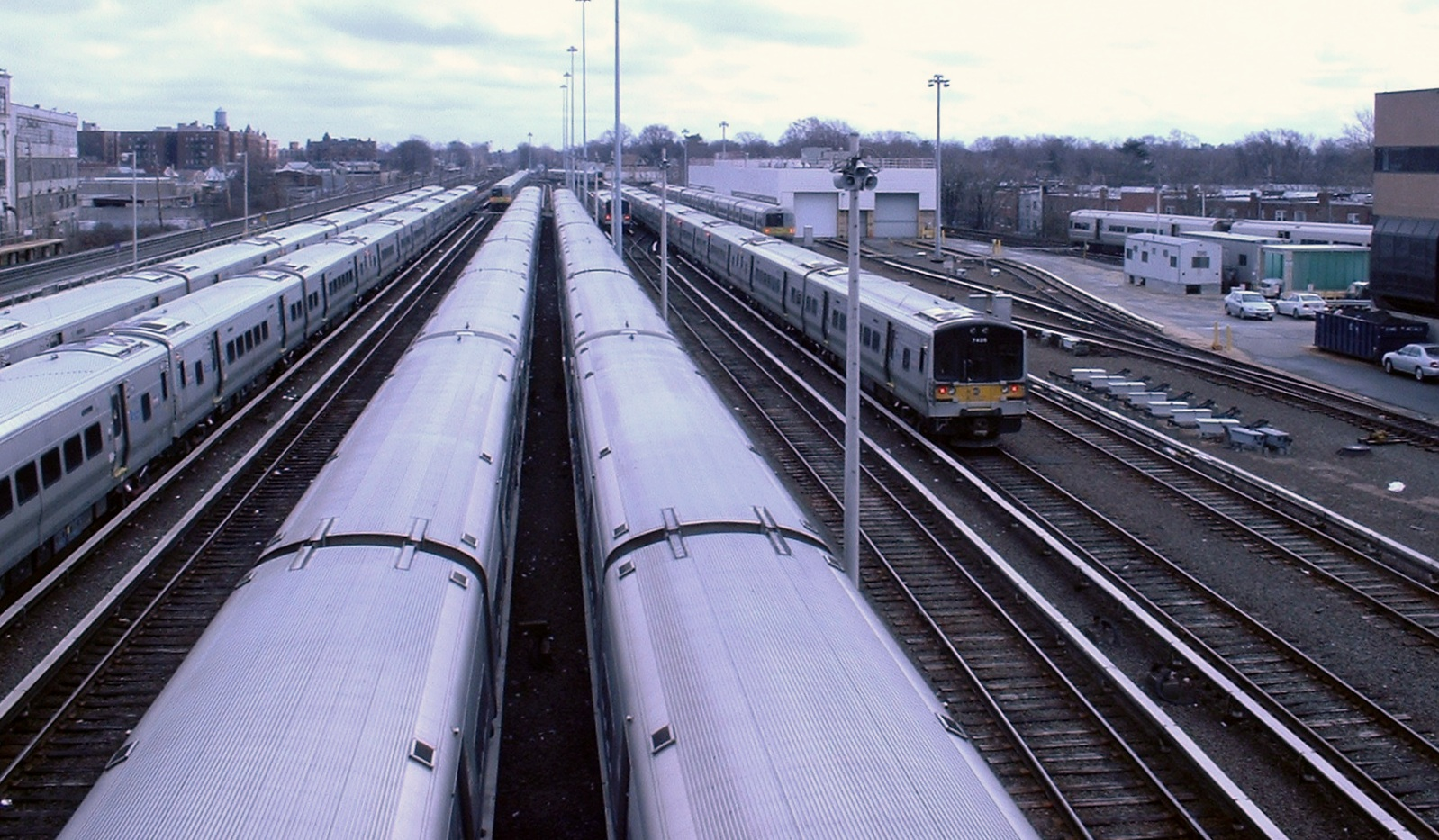
View east from station overpass over yard tracks; Platforms far left
