= Peninsula Hospital Center =

Coordinates: 40.59463°N 73.78145°W

Peninsula Nursing and Rehabilitation Center
- Cassena Care
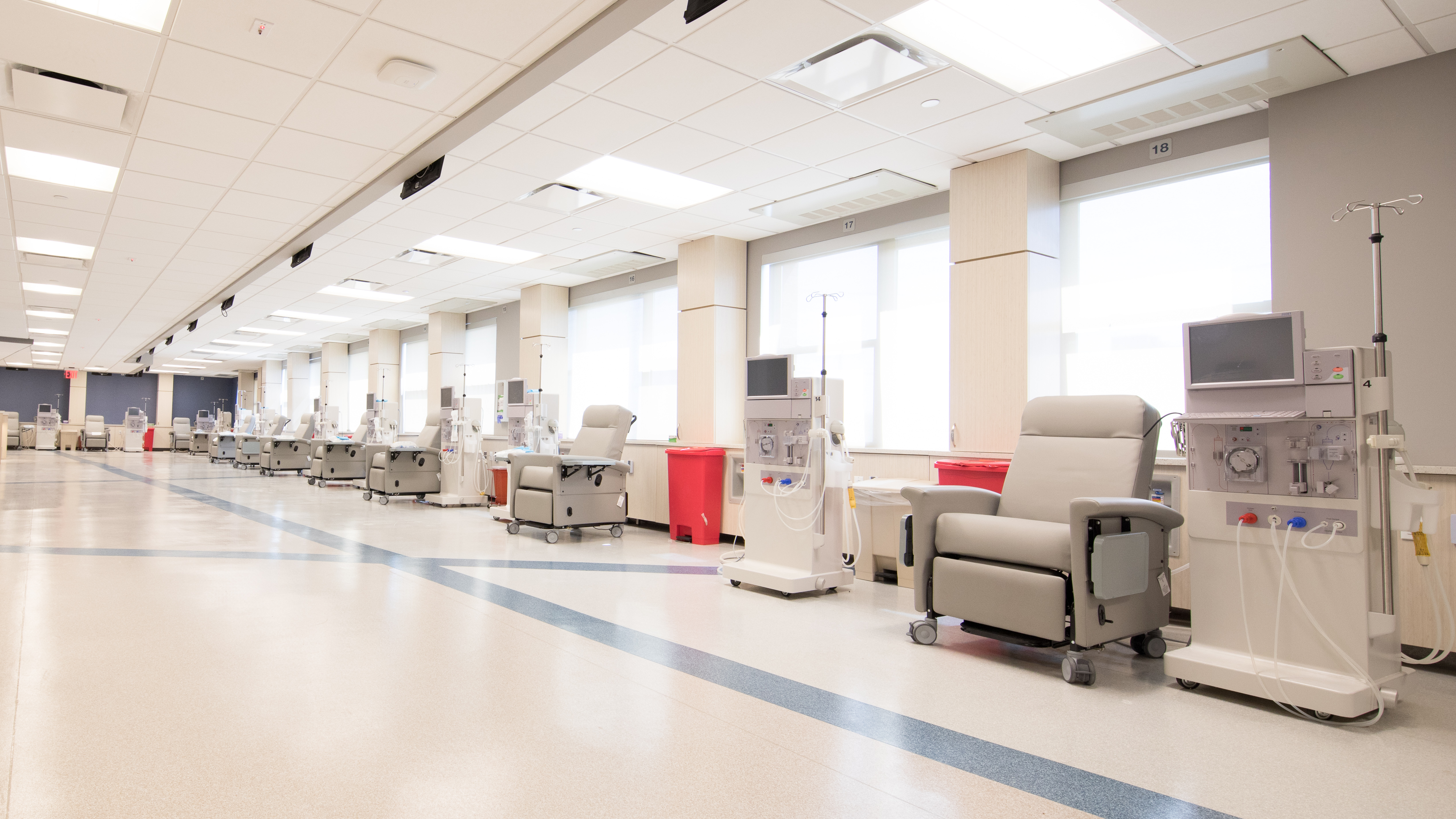
- Renew Restore Rehabilitate

Geography
- Location: 51-15 Beach Channel Drive, Far Rockaway, New York, United States

Organization
- Care system: Private

Services
- Beds: 200

Helipads
- Helipad: Yes

History
- Founded: 1911

Links
- Website: http://peninsulanrc.com/
- Lists: Hospitals in New York State
- Other links: Hospitals in Queens

Peninsula Nursing and Rehabilitation Center, formerly known as Rockaway Beach Hospital and Peninsula General Hospital, was a community hospital in the Far Rockaway neighborhood of Queens, New York. PHC, founded in 1908, which opened on April 30, 1911, was an affiliate of the MediSys Health Network at the time of its 2012 closure.

== History ==
The hospital expanded in 1960. In 1964, then still known as "Peninsula General Hospital in Edgemere, Queens," they built a supplementary 2-story structure primarily for nurses quarters. In the 1970s Peninsula attempted to take over another hospital.

PHC ran a 173-bed acute care community teaching hospital campus, and a 200-bed long-term care and rehabilitation center, serving the communities of the Rockaways, the Five Towns of Nassau County and parts of Queens and Brooklyn.

Peninsula, which in 2006 a state agency wanted St. Johns to absorb, closed in 2012.

Since 2014 the facility has been known as Peninsula Nursing and Rehabilitation Center operated by Cassena Care.

== Services ==
Peninsula Nursing and Rehabilitation Center offered the following medical services:

- Short Term Rehabilitation
- Long Term Rehabilitation
- 24-Hour Skilled Nursing Care
- Physical Therapy
- Occupational Therapy
- Speech Therapy
- Post-Operative Care
- Palliative Care and Hospice Services
- Dialysis
- Physician Services
- Specialist Services
- Therapeutic Recreation
- Respiratory Therapy
- Social Work
- Post-Operative Care
- Palliative Care and Hospice Services
- Cardiac Rehabilitation
- Pain Management
- Enteral Nutrition Therapy
- Wound Management
- Geriatric Care Management

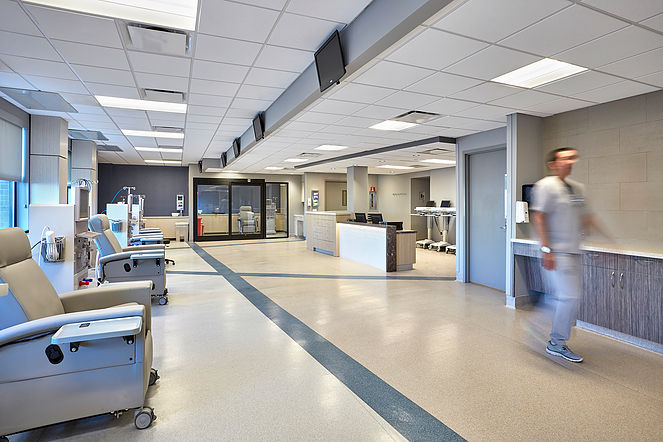
Peninsula Nursing and Rehabilitation Center

Medical staff residency training records and Verifications have become available through the Federation Credentials Verification Service (FCVS) Closed Residency program records.

== Auxiliary services ==
Nursing Home: Attached to the hospital is a 200-bed facility known as the Peninsula Center for Extended Care and Rehabilitation (PCECR).

Family Health Center: This facility offered comprehensive outpatient care for all ages.
