= Hillcrest General Hospital =

Defunct Queens hospital

Geography
- Location: Queens, New York, United States
- Coordinates: 40.7207°N 73.8078°W

History
- Opened: 1962
- Closed: 2007

Links
- Lists: Hospitals in New York State
- Other links: List of hospitals in Queens

Hillcrest General Hospital was opened around 1962 by Dr. Sheldon Schwartz, a physician, who served as its chief of medicine for 25 years." Hillcrest, a private hospital, was later sold to an investor, who leased it to Osteopathic Hospital and Clinic. Osteopathic previously had acquired another hospital to which they subsequently relocated, and the 5-story building became St. Joseph's Hospital in 1985.

GHI owned Hillcrest during the Osteopathic period.

== St. Joseph's Hospital ==
An April 2004 plan to "in the next year" close the hospital materialized sooner. St. Vincent Catholic Medical Centers had "run the hospital since 2000" and concluded it "sits near several other hospitals, so its closing may not have much effect on health care in the community." In 2007 the facility, after unsuccessful to at least provide services "that do not require patients to stay overnight in the hospital" was repurposed for use by Cornerstone of Medical Arts Center Hospital, although the community was "particularly worried about drug-abuse and alcoholism patients being within a few blocks of" schools.

== Osteopathic Hospital and Clinic ==
Osteopathic Hospital and Clinic had their own locations prior to leasing Hillcrest's building, including one they bought in 1954.
