= Willow Tree station (LIRR) =

Train station in New York City (1837–72)

Willow Tree
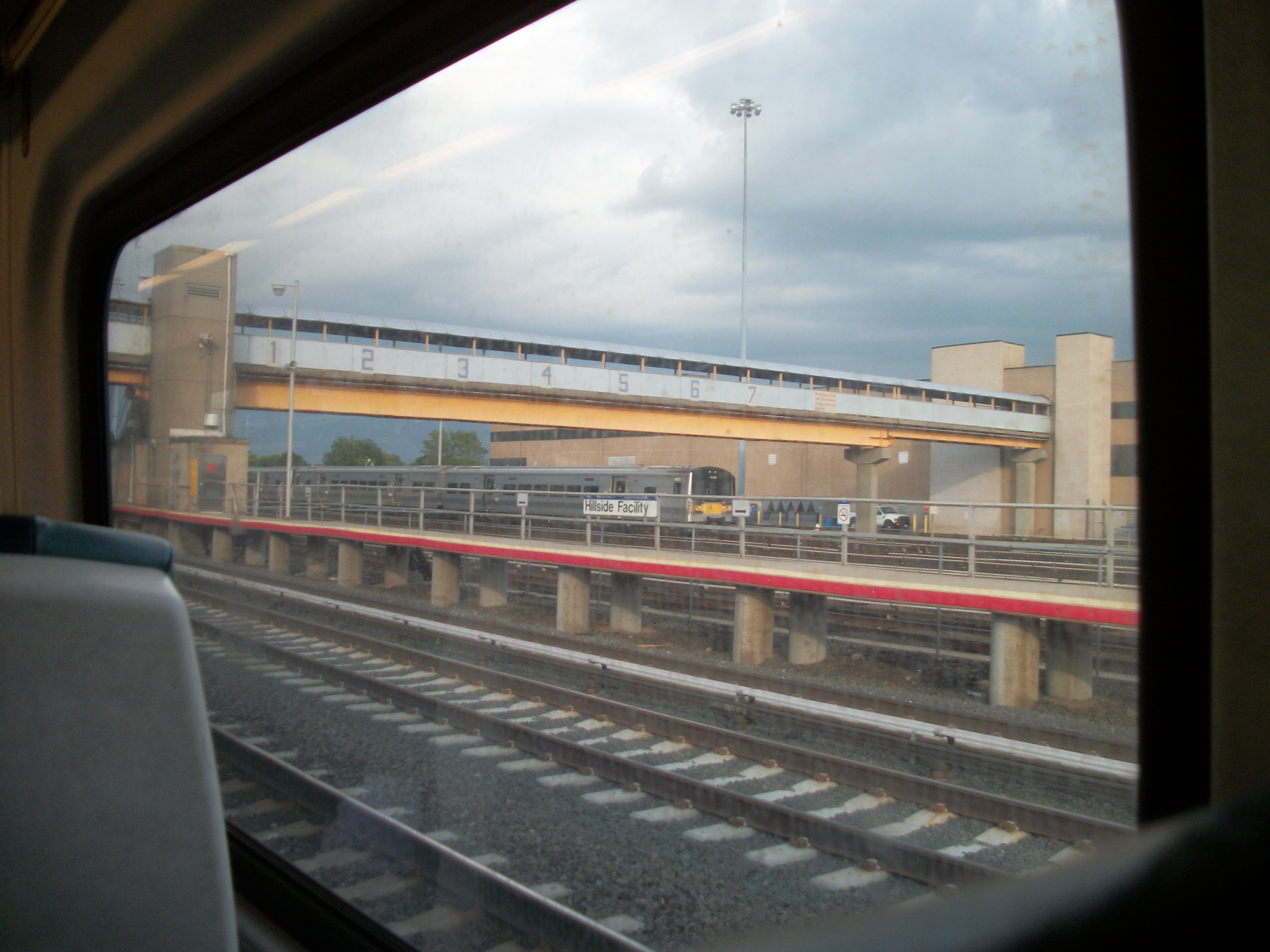
- The former site of the station, now the platforms at the Hillside Facility.

General information
- Location: Hamilton Street; Hollis, Queens, New York
- Coordinates: 40.707835°N 73.776746°W
- Line: Main Line
- Platforms: 1
- Tracks: 2

History
- Opened: March 1, 1837
- Closed: June 1872

Former services
Preceding station	Long Island Rail Road	Following station
Jamaica toward Long Island City or Penn Station	Main Line	Bellaire toward Greenport
Location

Willow Tree was a Main Line Long Island Rail Road station that was opened on the north side of the tracks and the west side of 183rd Street, then known as Hamilton Street. It was located in what is today the Hollis section of Queens, New York City.

== History ==
Willow Tree station opened on March 1, 1837, when Long Island Rail Road (LIRR) service opened to Hicksville. The land for the Willow Tree station was 50 by 562.6 feet (15.2 by 171.5 m) and was purchased on April 18, 1836. Willow Tree can be found in timetables as early as October 1, 1852, and as late as November 4, 1867. In the year ending June 30, 1861, 75,650 quarts of milk were received from the Willow Tree station.

An 1868 book says that only the Sunday excursion trains, and the North Islip and Hempstead passenger trains regularly stop there. On April 23, 1869, on the eve of the LIRR's 35th anniversary, a three car train, pulled by Thurlow Weed, hit a broken rail and derailed just east of Willow Tree at 187th Street. Six people died and 14 people were seriously injured.

There was no depot building, but there was a dwelling house located close to the track which was fitted with a seat fixed on the outside for the use of waiting passengers. In September 1871, LIRR President Oliver Charlick decided to abandon the station, and the station is last listed in June 1872. However, on a track map its closure is listed as 1880. After its closure, it was superseded by the Rockaway Junction station. Since 1991, the site of the Willow Tree station has been occupied by the present site of the platforms for the Hillside Facility over the 183rd Street bridge.
