= Canal Street station (LIRR) =

Train station in New York City (1890–99)

Canal Street
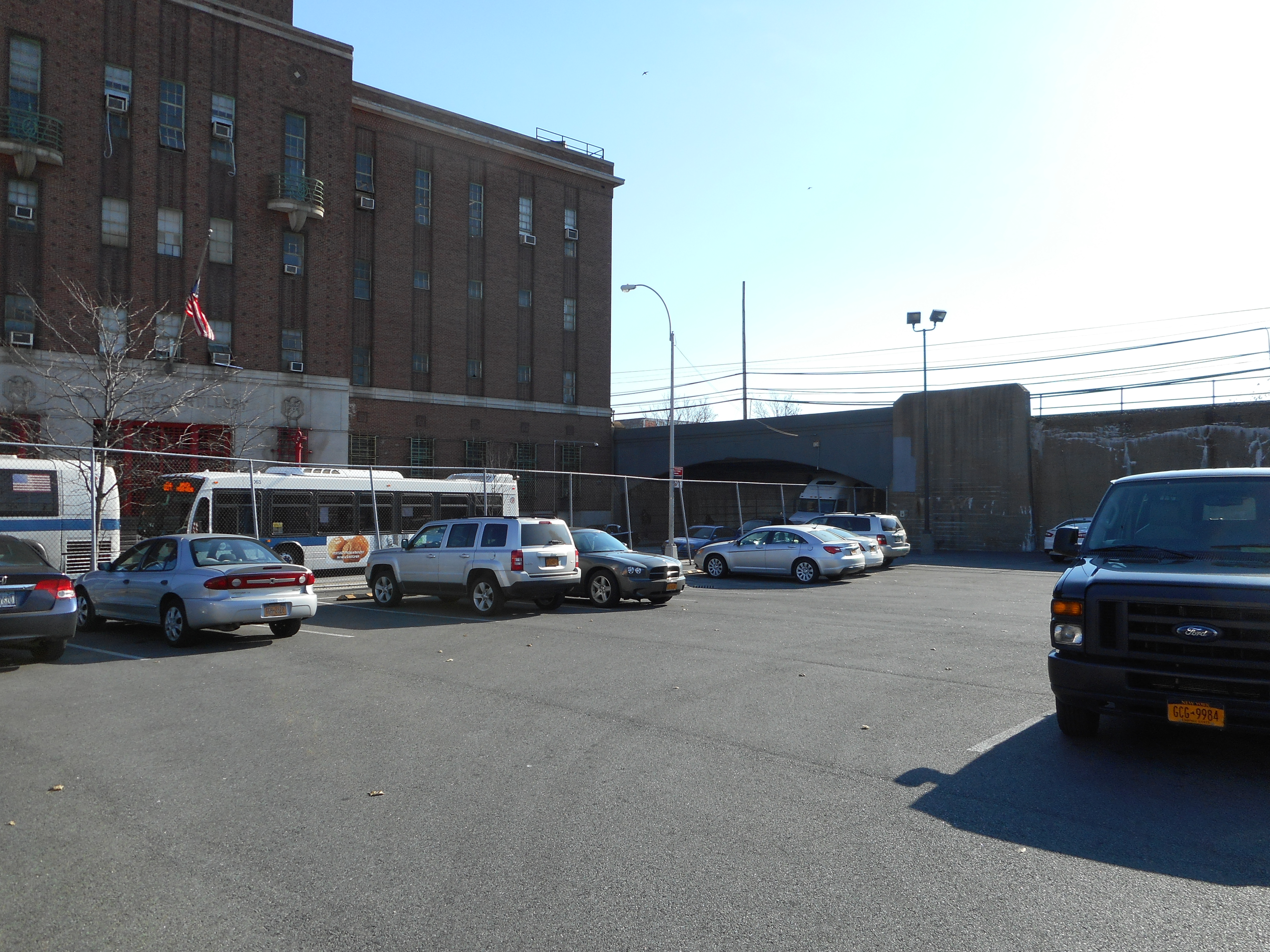
- New York Army National Guard's 104th Field Artillery Armory building, site of the former Canal Street station.

General information
- Location: 168th Street and 93rd Avenue; Jamaica, Queens, New York
- Coordinates: 40.704303°N 73.790864°W
- Owner: Long Island Rail Road
- Lines: Main Line and Montauk Branch

History
- Opened: June 24, 1890
- Closed: mid-1899

Former services
Preceding station	Long Island Rail Road	Following station
Union Hall Street toward Long Island City or Penn Station	Main Line	Hillside toward Greenport
Union Hall Street toward Long Island City	Montauk Division	Hillside toward Montauk
Location

Canal Street was a station on the Long Island Rail Road's Main Line and Montauk Branch at Canal Street (now 168th Street) in Jamaica, Queens, New York City, United States.

== History ==
The station opened on June 24, 1890, when the local Atlantic Avenue rapid transit trains were extended from Woodhaven Junction through Jamaica to Rockaway Junction, their new terminal. The station was closed in 1899, soon after the "rapid transit" trains started running to the Brooklyn Bridge. Seventeen years later, Brooklyn–Manhattan Transit Corporation opened 168th Street Station on the Jamaica Elevated Line as a replacement, which existed until 1977. The vicinity of the station is now occupied by the 104th Field Artillery Armory building of the New York Army National Guard, which was built in 1933.
