= St. Mary's Children's Hospital =

Bayside, Queens hospital

Coordinates: 40°46′36″N 73°46′7″W

- St. Mary's Healthcare System for Children

Geography
- Location: Queens, New York, United States

Services
- Beds: 124

History
- Opened: 1870

Links
- Website: https://www.stmaryskids.org/
- Lists: Hospitals in New York State
- Other links: List of hospitals in Queens

St. Mary's Children's Hospital, which was founded in 1870, was described in 2020 as "As New York City’s only post-acute pediatric care facility." In 1951 it moved from its Manhattan location to Queens. Despite its name, it has specialized programs for teens and also for young adults. During the 2020 Coronavirus period, due to parts of their facility being "regulated as an adult nursing home," many of their programs closed March 2020 through May 2021.

== History ==
They began as "a small, 15-bed hospital in Hell’s Kitchen" in 1870.

The hospital's parent's name is St. Mary's Healthcare System for Children, and their programs include specialized healthcare for "children with medical complexity and special healthcare needs."
