= Boulevard Hospital =

Defunct Queens hospital

- Front of the former Boulevard Hospital

Geography
- Location: Queens, New York, United States
- Coordinates: 40.7586°N 73.9122°W

Services
- Beds: 234

History
- Opened: March 17, 1927
- Closed: Yes
- Demolished: No

Links
- Lists: Hospitals in New York State
- Other links: List of hospitals in Queens

Boulevard Hospital was a 234-bed private hospital in Queens, NY.

== History ==
Boulevard opened its doors on March 17, 1927. It was owned by a group of 24 doctors. In 1983, an administrator who had been fired provided authorities with evidence that led to an investigation of alleged improprieties, including improperly withheld refunds due thousands of patients, billing patients and insurance companies for unnecessary care, and using hospital employees for the owners' personal chores. The hospital lost its payment stream from Medicaid and Medicare in 1985 and closed shortly thereafter.
