= James Rahal =

American physician (1933–2011)

James J. Rahal (October 14, 1933, Boston – June 11, 2011, Manhattan, aged 77) was an American medical doctor who specialized in the study and treatment of infectious diseases. He was educated at Harvard University and the medical school at Tufts University. Rahal was one of the first doctors to raise concerns about drug-resistant bacteria and was a leading expert on the treatment of West Nile virus. He was a professor of medicine at the Weill Cornell Medical College of Cornell University, and Director of the Division of Infectious Diseases at the affiliated New York Hospital Queens in Flushing.

Rahal died on June 11, 2011, from a rare disorder called Rosai-Dorfman disease.
