= Van Wyck Hospital =

Far Rockaway, Queens hospital

Geography
- Location: Queens, New York, United States

Services
- Beds: 50

Links
- Lists: Hospitals in New York State
- Other links: List of hospitals in Queens

Van Wyck Hospital was a private hospital located on Van Wyck Boulevard in Queens, NY and was among those New York City hospitals which passed newly tightened regulations enacted in 1936 "governing the physical equipment and the clinical and nursing standards."

Van Wyck later changed its name and subsequently closed.

== History ==
The hospital, equipped with "fifty beds for surgery and medicine," was subsequently known as Doctor's Hospital of Queens. Doctor's was a partnership of two individuals "doing business as."

=== Controversies ===
A doctor sentenced to jail for perjury subsequently refused to reveal details of surgery he performed at Van Wyck Hospital on an 18-year-old girl whose weight had dropped from 110 to 67 pounds.

Another case at this hospital involved "an illegal operation" performed at Van Wyck on a police officer's wife, "mother of a boy, 14 and a girl, 12." The court continued despite a claim that the statute of limitations had expired and one of the doctors involved was dead.
