= Holliswood Hospital =

Former hospital in Queens, New York

Geography
- Location: Hollis, Queens, New York, United States
- Coordinates: 40.71788700413755°N 73.76980477444856°W

Organization
- Type: Specialist
- Affiliated university: New York Institute of Technology College of Osteopathic Medicine

Services
- Beds: 100
- Speciality: Psychiatric hospital

History
- Opened: 1986
- Closed: 2013

Links
- Lists: Hospitals in New York State

Holliswood Hospital was a Hollis, Queens 100-bed psychiatric-specialty teaching hospital affiliated with the New York Institute of Technology College of Osteopathic Medicine. The hospital opened in 1986 and closed in 2013. Their patients included teenagers.

The hospital was opened as a for-profit venture. Their funding covered both those who have mental illnesses and also those with substance abuse problems, but "they treat those clients in separate programs." For out-patients who are on medications, when a problem occurs there is a need "to find out whether it is because he has stopped taking his medication, is taking other drugs or both."

Holliswood hosted "a 13 part series on public television" covering topics such as depression, including interviewing Mike Wallace.

== History ==
The 1951-built structure housing Holliswood previously was "Terrace Heights Hospital, which had closed a year or so earlier."

Early in the year prior to their closing, they hired a new chief executive; fund raising was attempted. One of their causes for closing was that "a significant payer ... filed for bankruptcy."

=== Aftermath ===
Four years after Holliswood closed, the site had "garbage strewn across its grounds." In 2019 an application was filed with the local community board to tear down the building and approve a "proposal to build 19 two-story one-family houses."

== Controversy ==
"A Queens grand jury investigating the circumstances surrounding governmental approval of Holliswood Hospital has returned an indictment in the case" was reported 3 months after the hospital opened. Related to this was the question of if the director of clinical services, who subsequently quit, was properly appointed.
