= Terrace Heights Hospital =

Hospitals in Queens/NYC

Geography
- Location: Hollis, Queens, New York, United States
- Coordinates: 40.71788700413755°N 73.76980477444856°W

Organization
- Type: General

Services
- Beds: 166

History
- Opened: 1947
- Closed: 1985

Links
- Lists: Hospitals in New York State

Terrace Heights Hospital was a privately owned 166-bed hospital in Hollis, Queens that opened in 1947 and closed in 1984.

The hospital was a "general medical facility"

== History ==
In 1976, they were told by New York's State Health Department that "its obstetric and pediatric services might be shut down" because of under-utilization;

In 1979, they were on a list of 10 hospitals the state wanted to close because of "3,000 unnecessary beds."

The year after the hospital closed, Holliswood Hospital, a psychiatric hospital, bought the building.
