= Preferred Health Network =

Healthcare service provider and medical facility manager

Preferred Health Network is a non-profit network of hospitals that was formed in 1989. That same year, they took over the managing of Brooklyn's Wyckoff Heights Medical Center and Jackson Heights' Physicians Hospital. When several other hospitals were facing a choice between "closing down or seeking protection in a merger" the result was that "Ten hospitals in Nassau and Queens have become Preferred Health Network."

== History ==
Having started in 1989 with one hospital, and shortly thereafter another, they grew to ten. However, by 1996 they were down to four hospitals, and ready for being taken over by New York Hospital; they had also added "more than 20 primary care facilities in Brooklyn and Queens."

In 1996 Crain's New York Business wrote that "the real jewels of PHN are the primary care centers that dot Brooklyn and Queens" and explained that these primary care centers provide "low-cost delivery of health care" and also enable hospitals to "capture more seriously ill patients to fill their beds."

== See also ==
- Flushing Hospital Medical Center
