= Hillside Sanitarium =

Defunct Queens hospital

Hillside Sanitarium was a private hospital that opened in 1926 and closed in 1931; their permit was revoked despite community support (The New York Times headlined "Says Hospital Is Needed").

== History ==
Hillside, which opened Jan. 4, 1926 closed Aug. 15, 1931. Although it was "conducted by Dr. Otto Gitlin," who ran it "for more than five years." it was not clear how well, and whether it should be allowed to continue.

=== Hearings ===
Opposition existed both from within and from regulators. Hearings held in June 1931 included presentations of a two years prior death; investigations did not stop with the closure.

There was evidence that the local community wanted it to continue; authorities disagreed.
