= Rockaway Junction station =

Junction and train station in New York City

Rockaway Junction
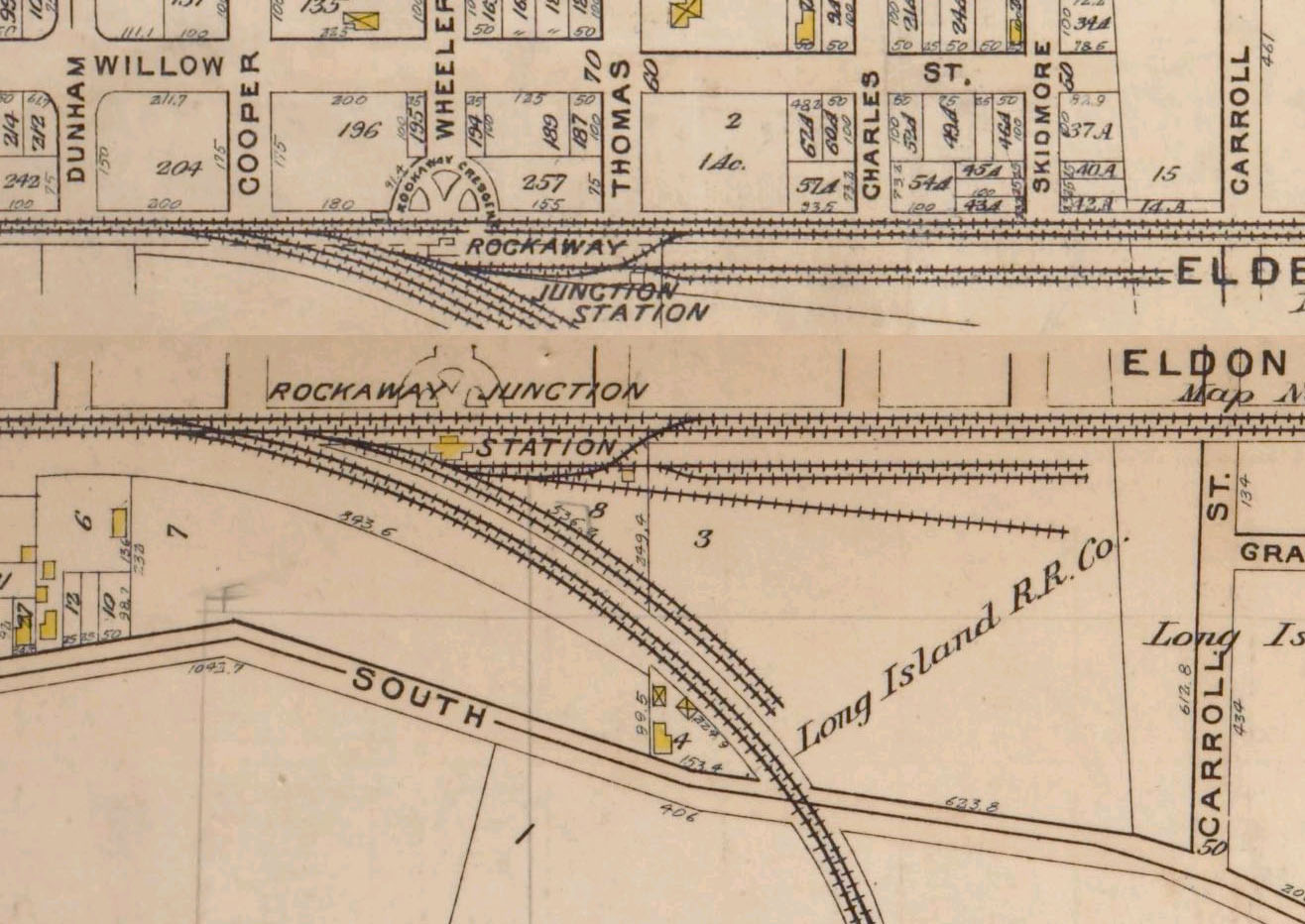
- 1909 map, showing the station on the south side of the Main Line tracks at 178th Place.

General information
- Location: 178th Place south of 93rd Avenue; Hillside, Queens (near Jamaica)
- Coordinates: 40.706529°N 73.782715°W
- Owner: Long Island Rail Road
- Lines: Main Line and Montauk Branch

History
- Opened: June 1875 or June 24, 1890
- Closed: Late 1905–1910
- Electrified: August 29, 1905

Services
Preceding station	Long Island Rail Road	Following station
Hillside toward Long Island City or Penn Station	Main Line	Hollis toward Greenport
Hillside toward Long Island City	Montauk Division	St. Albans toward Montauk
Location

Rockaway Junction was a junction and station on the Long Island Rail Road's Main Line and Montauk Branch in Hillside, Queens, New York City, United States. It was located in the vicinity where the Montauk Branch now crosses over the two eastbound passenger tracks and the two freight tracks of the Main Line, just west of the Hillside Facility, although at the time of the station's existence it was at ground level along with the junction itself.

== History ==
The junction was formed in 1871, when the LIRR's Rockaway Branch (now the Montauk Branch) was built south from the Main Line. It was not a station until June 1875, when it first appeared on a timetable as the first stop of the Rockaway Branch, and superseded the nearby Willow Tree station and when the local Atlantic Avenue rapid transit trains were extended from Woodhaven Junction through Jamaica to Rockaway Junction, their new terminal. Other sources say it opened on June 24, 1890, when at the same time the Canal Street station opened. By 1897, these local trains continued along the Main Line to Hempstead or the Montauk Division to Valley Stream.

Electric service to Rockaway Junction began on August 29, 1905, but the station house was torn down between 1905 and 1906 for construction of the Holban Yard, a major LIRR freight yard. However, Rockaway Junction still appeared on timetables until 1910. The junction itself was eliminated when the tracks were elevated between 1929 and 1931, and included a bridge for the Montauk Branch to cross over the two eastbound passenger tracks and the two freight tracks of the Main Line, just west of the Holban Yard. Roughly eight decades after the station closed, the Rockaway Junction site and nearby Holban Yard became the site of the LIRR's Hillside Maintenance Facility.

== Confusion with Hillside ==
This station is often confused with the nearby Hillside station, due to their locations (Hillside was located two blocks west at 177th Street), and the fact that their years overlap. Hillside's opening is unknown (although suspected to be in 1909) and closed in 1911. It reopened in May 1911 and closed in 1966, while Rockaway Junction opened in 1890 and closed in 1905/1906 and still appeared on timetables until 1910.
