= Jules Blankfein =

Physician, co-founder of Physicians Hospital

Jules Blankfein (died June 2, 1989) was a physician and financier; co-founder of Physicians Hospital in Jackson Heights, Queens (New York City). He was a 1921 graduate of Yale University, and received a medical degree from New York Medical College and Flower-Fifth Avenue Hospital in 1928. Blankfein was one of the nine physicians who founded Physicians Hospital (NYC) in 1935; he served for many years as its president and as a director. He served as a trustee of New York Medical College and as vice president of its alumni association. In 1967, he was awarded the New York Medical College Medal of Honor for his philanthropy.

== Personal ==
The New York Times notes that "he was a trustee of New York Medical College" and that he "contributed generously to many Jewish causes." Jules Blankfein and his family remained involved with Yale from the time of his graduation in 1921, launching a lineage at the University. He and his wife Frieda were the parents of two sons.
