= Booth Memorial Hospital =

Hospitals affiliated with The Salvation Army

Booth Memorial Hospital is the name of any of the hospitals affiliated with The Salvation Army (TSA); the latter was "founded by William Booth in 1878." The first of these "opened Booth Memorial in Manhattan in 1914 and its center in Flushing in 1957." Salvation Army Booth Memorial Hospital is a longer name used for some of them.

== New York City's Booth Memorial Hospital ==
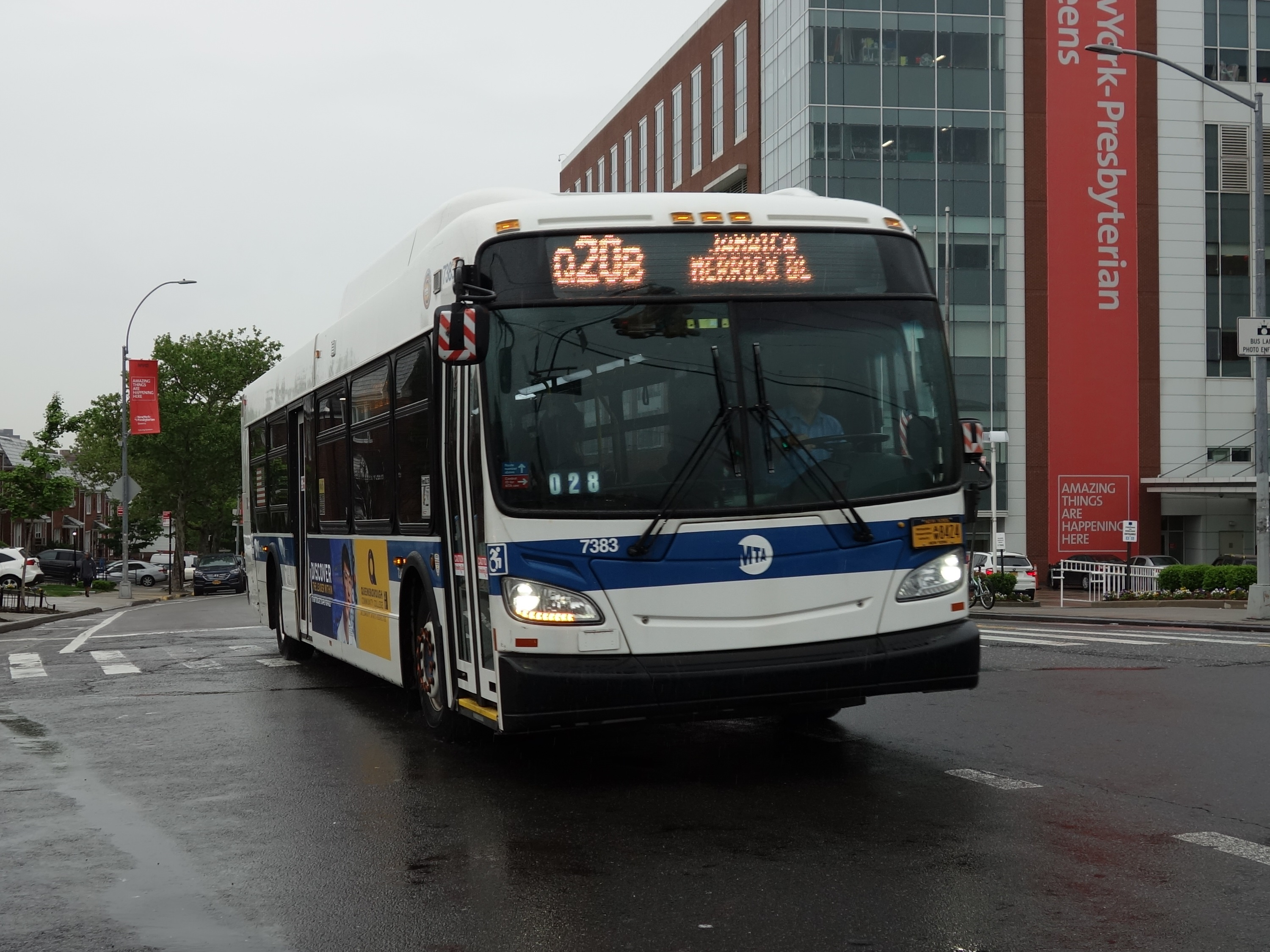
A Jamaica-bound Q20B bus passing by the hospital on Main Street

The Booth Memorial Hospital in Flushing, Queens, New York City was "the largest voluntary hospital in Queens." The hospital began in 1892 as a non-profit hospital in Manhattan. The hospital moved to two other Manhattan locations in subsequent years. The campus in Queens was dedicated and opened on February 5, 1957. Around this time, North Hempstead Turnpike was renamed Booth Memorial Avenue. In 1992, the hospital was purchased from the Salvation Army by New York Hospital in Manhattan, becoming New York Hospital Queens in May 1993.

== St. Louis's Booth Memorial Hospital ==
Booth Memorial Hospital is also the name given to a hospital located in St. Louis founded by The Salvation Army. Booth was built in 1855 and "stood at least until the 1950s" when it was torn down. It was sometimes referred to as Salvation Army Booth Memorial Hospital.

== Covington's Booth Memorial Hospital ==
Booth Memorial Hospital located in Covington, Kentucky founded by The Salvation Army. The original building owner Amos Shinkle, a contemporary of Simon Kenton and Daniel Boone, was a pioneer Northern Kentucky businessman and industrialist. He selected the high point overlooking the Ohio and Licking Rivers and built his home on that location. The building was, in typical fashion of that day, a castle-like structure of brick masonry, large windows and turrets having marble statuary, inlaid floors, and high ceilings. After Amos Shinkle died, the remaining family members reached an understanding with the Salvation Army on the use of the mansion. Then, in 1913 renovating and remodeling got underway to transform the old mansion into the William Booth Memorial Hospital. The first patients were admitted in 1914. The original William Booth Memorial Hospital of Covington, Kentucky was converted to residences, and now is the Governor's Point condominium complex in the heart of the historic district on Second Street.

== Other USA locations ==
- Chicago, Illinois: closed 1984.
- Cleveland, Ohio: Booth Memorial Hospital Cleveland
- Brookline, Massachusetts: Booth Memorial Hospital [now closed]
- Detroit, Michigan: Opened in late 1890s, demolished 2006.
- North Omaha, Nebraska: There were four locations, some of which operated concurrently. The earliest opened in 1896 and closed in 1920. Other opening years were 1920, 1936 and 1966. The last of these "incarnations" closed in 1978. One of them "was renamed for Catherine Booth."
