= Astoria Sanitarium =

Defunct Queens hospital

Astoria Sanitorium

Geography
- Location: Queens, New York, United States

History
- Former names: Astoria General Hospital, Mount Sinai Queens, Western Queens Community Hospital
- Closed: 1898

Links
- Lists: Hospitals in New York State

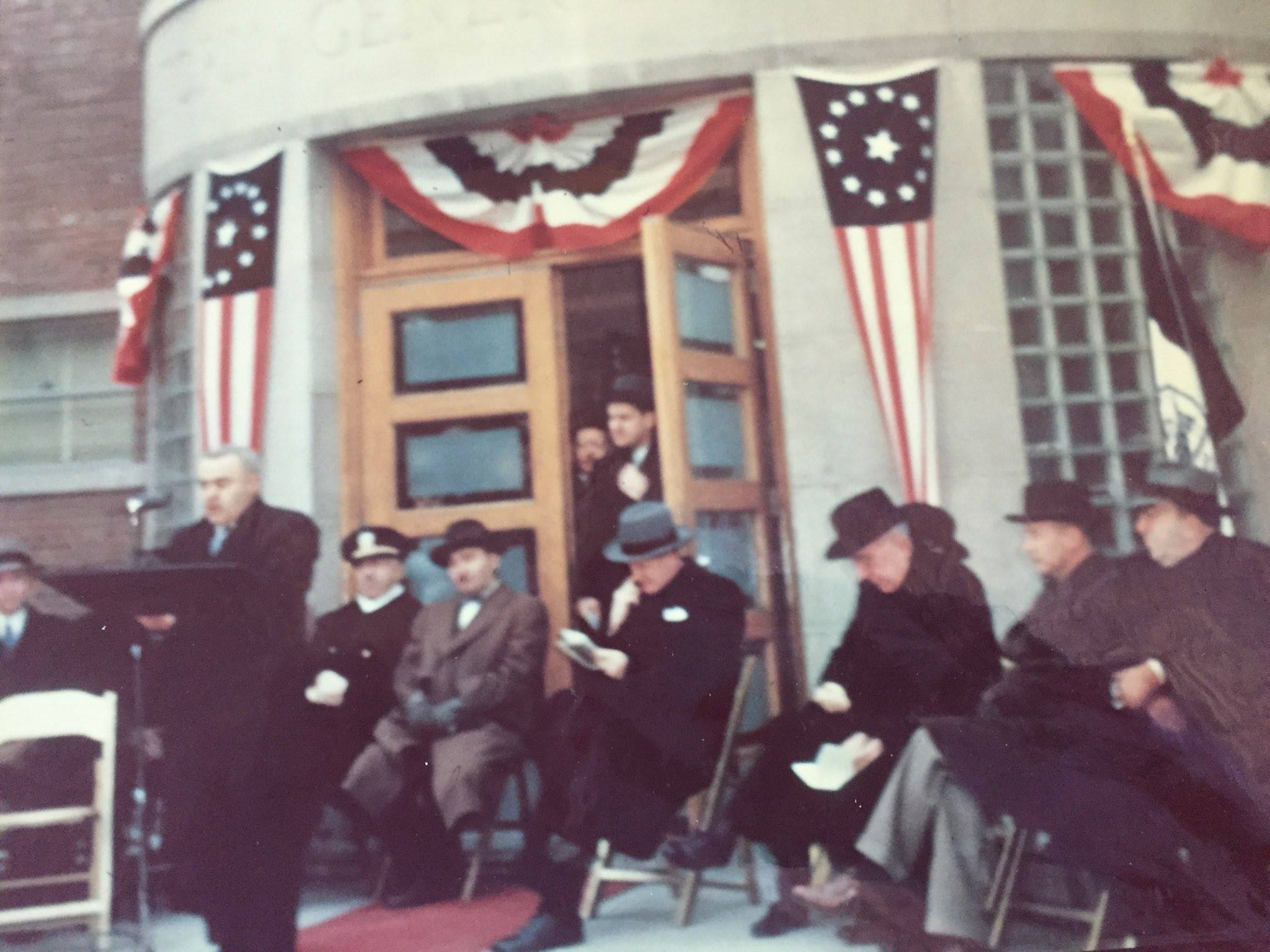

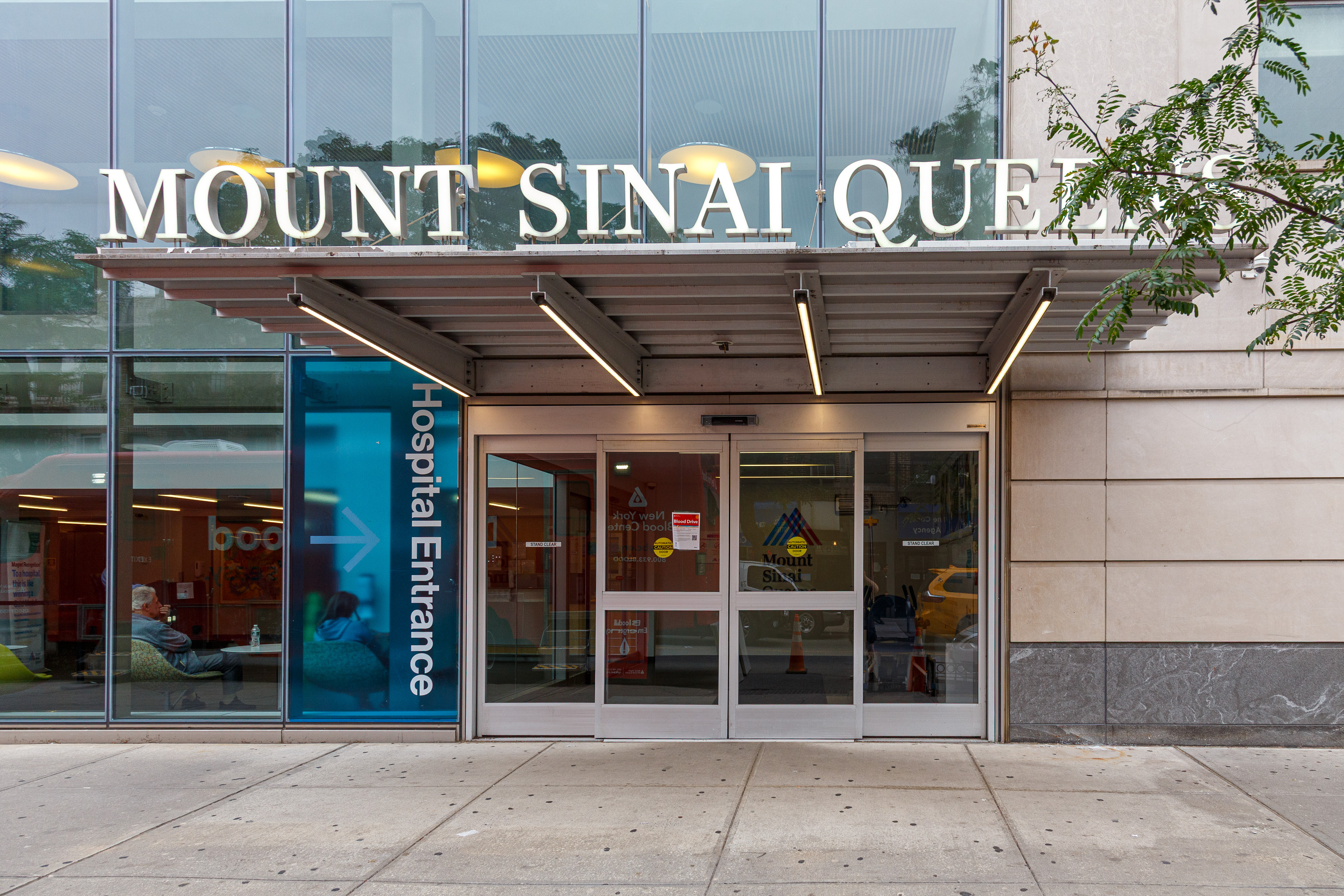
Mount Sinai Queens

Astoria Sanitarium, also referred to as Daly's Astoria Sanitarium, was a private hospital owned by John F. Daly. The name has also been used in connection with later successor institutions in western Queens, including Astoria General Hospital, Western Queens Community Hospital, and the facility now (2026) known as Mount Sinai Queens.

== History ==
A medical facility in Queens, NY named Astoria Hospital closed in 1898, and in 1910 "several former doctors from the Hospital attempted to revive Astoria Hospital, but they were unsuccessful." A 1925 attempt, using the name Daly's Astoria Sanitorium, operating as "a private sanatorium and maternity hospital" succeeded.

=== Astoria General Hospital ===
"A group of physicians purchased the hospital in 1949 and changed its name to Astoria General Hospital; this was 32 years after Dr. Daly had finished Fordham Medical School. In 1993, Astoria General affiliated with Mount Sinai. With some fund raising, they expanded and relocated.

=== Controversy ===
The New York Daily News in 1928 published a story regarding a resident of Astoria Sanitarium, and her husband, the sanitarium's owner, who were key parties in attempts to unravel the murder of a police officer.

== As Mount Sinai Queens ==
In June 1999, The Mount Sinai Hospital acquired Western Queens Community Hospital for $40 million and renamed it The Mount Sinai Hospital of Queens (now Mount Sinai Queens), making it the first community hospital to bear the Mount Sinai name.

Mount Sinai Queens is a licensed acute-care hospital in the Astoria neighborhood, located at 25-10 30th Avenue.

In the 2010s, the hospital undertook a multi-phase modernization and expansion project. Construction of a six-story, 140,000-square-foot pavilion began in 2013 and opened in phases, including the Stavros Niarchos Foundation Emergency Department (2016), expanded operating rooms, and additional outpatient services.
