= Jamaica Hospital Medical Center =

Hospital in Queens, New York

- MediSys Health Network
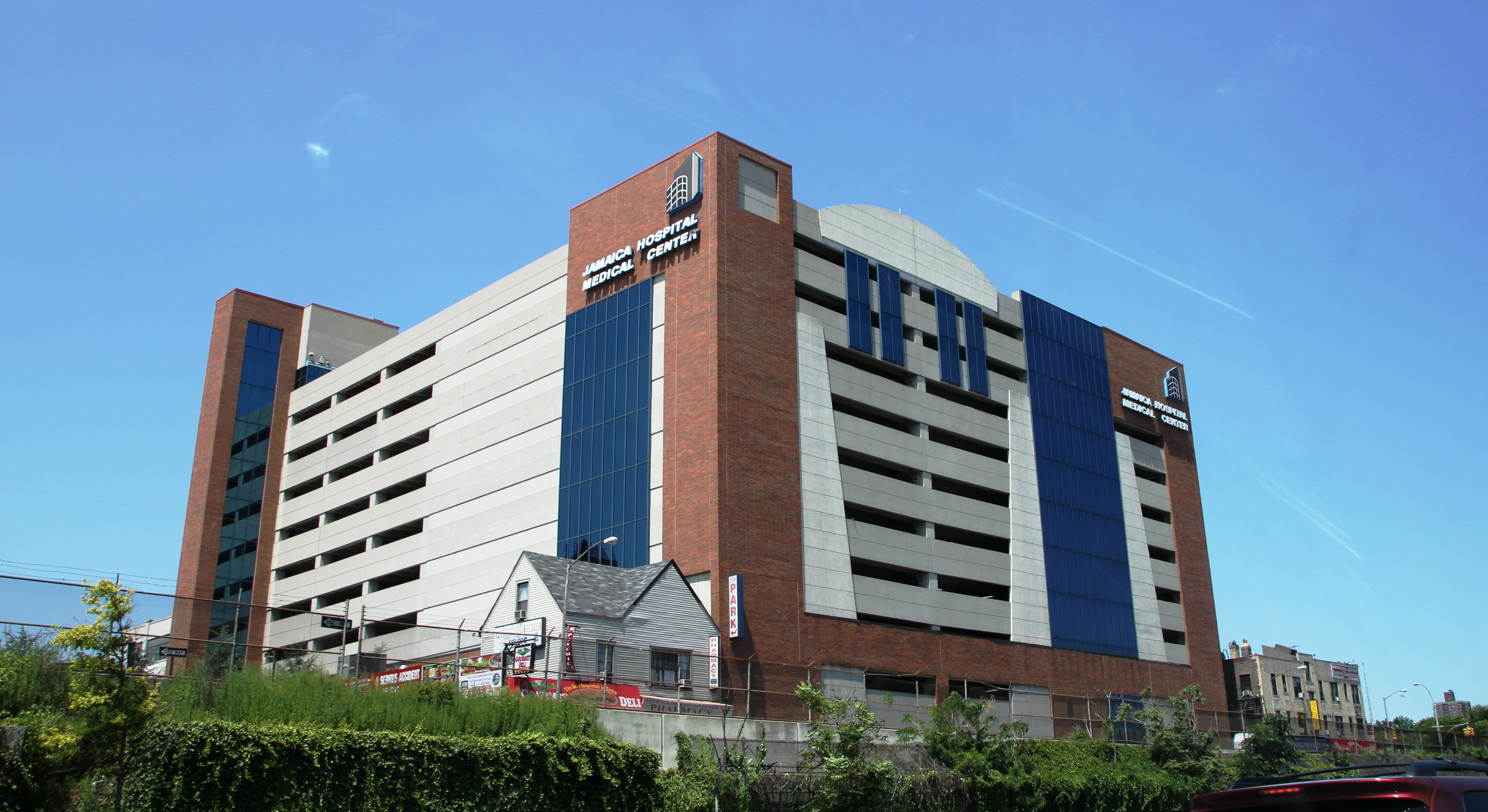
- Jamaica Hospital, 2012

Geography
- Location: Queens, New York, United States
- Coordinates: 40.7005°N 73.816°W

Organization
- Type: Teaching
- Affiliated university: New York Institute of Technology College of Osteopathic Medicine
- Network: MediSys Health Network

Services
- Emergency department: Level I trauma center
- Beds: 607, 402

History
- Opened: 1891

Links
- Website: jamaicahospital.org
- Lists: Hospitals in New York State
- Other links: Hospitals in Queens

Jamaica Hospital Medical Center is a private, non-profit teaching hospital and emergency facility in the Jamaica neighborhood of Queens, New York City, on the service road of the Van Wyck Expressway at Jamaica Avenue. The hospital is a clinical campus of the New York Institute of Technology College of Osteopathic Medicine and provides clinical clerkship education for the college's osteopathic medical students.

== Origins ==
Since 1837, the village of Jamaica, Queens, had been served by the stagecoach. In 1883, the Long Island Rail Road opened its Atlantic Branch to Brooklyn, making Jamaica a suburb of New York City. The residents held a fundraiser in 1883 and collected $179.40 (equivalent to $6,199 in 2025). This money was saved until the Jamaica Hospital was opened in 1891 near what is now Jamaica Avenue and 169th Street. At that time the founders applied to state officials for a certificate of incorporation, which was granted on February 20, 1892.

Jamaica Hospital's first permanent location opened on June 18, 1898, near the Union Hall Street station on the east side of New York Avenue (Guy Brewer Blvd), a short distance north of South Street. The new hospital building opened on May 1, and despite not being ready to fully receive patients, admitted its first patients several days later due to an influx of wounded during the Spanish–American War. By July every available space was occupied by soldiers.

== Jamaica Hospital dedicated ==
The new Jamaica Hospital building on Van Wyck Boulevard was completed on August 24, 1924, where the first patient was admitted. The following day the building was dedicated and Jamaica Hospital formally opened.

== Notable births ==
- Sophia Laforteza, singer and member of Katseye
- Donald Trump, 45th and 47th president of the United States
- DJ Muggs, member of Cypress Hill

== See also ==
- List of hospitals in New York City
- List of hospitals in Queens
