= Parsons Hospital =

100-bed hospital in Queens/NYC

Coordinates: 40.7657392°N 73.8242408°W

Geography
- Location: Queens, New York, United States

Organization
- Type: General
- Affiliated university: New York Institute of Technology College of Osteopathic Medicine

Services
- Beds: 100

History
- Former name: Flushing Hospital Medical Center North Division
- Opened: before 1950
- Closed: 1988

Links
- Lists: Hospitals in New York State

Parsons Hospital was "a small proprietary hospital in Queens" that was transformed into one focused to serving a local largely immigrant population. The hospital, which opened before 1950, closed in 1988, two years after it "was purchased by Asian American doctors."

== History ==
In 1986 a group of doctors purchased the 100-bed hospital "to serve the Asian population in Flushing, Queens." It became a division of Flushing Hospital Medical Center in 1988 the latter was acquired by New York Hospital in April 1996. Parsons closed within months of being "cut off from Medicare and Medicaid reimbursement" for serious violations.

The building was sold with the understanding that the new owner would demolish it.
