= MediSys Health Network =

Healthcare service provider and medical facility manager

MediSys Health Network is a 1995-established healthcare service provider that also manages medical facilities. It is best known for operating Brookdale University Hospital and Medical Center (for 12 years), Jamaica Hospital Medical Center, and Flushing Hospital.

MediSys also operates a network of family health care clinics and home health agencies.

== Overview ==
In addition to running hospitals, clinics and home health agencies, MediSys has entered—with a partner, the area of organ-procurement.

In 2001, MediSys was entrusted to take over operation of a facility for "350 people with mental illness" of whom 24 had been subjected to unnecessary but profitable surgeries. This success was followed by a similar takeover in 2002.

MediSys also operates Medisys Richmond Hill Family Center, an Urgent Care facility.

== Trump Pavilion ==
MediSys operates "Trump Pavilion, a 228-bed nursing home located in the Jamaica Hospital Medical Center;" the latter is where Donald Trump was born. The nursing home "is named for and was financed by President Trump's mother." Mrs. Trump's family wrote that "contributions in memory of" her late husband "may be made to the Trump Pavilion."

== Controversy ==
MediSys was investigated in 2010 regarding conflict of interest. In 2012, they were forced to drop their ownership/management of Brookdale. Medisys's CEO and others later pleaded guilty to federal charges. Around the same time, nurses and faculty managed by MediSys voted to strike over the loss of their benefits.
