= Wyckoff Heights Medical Center =

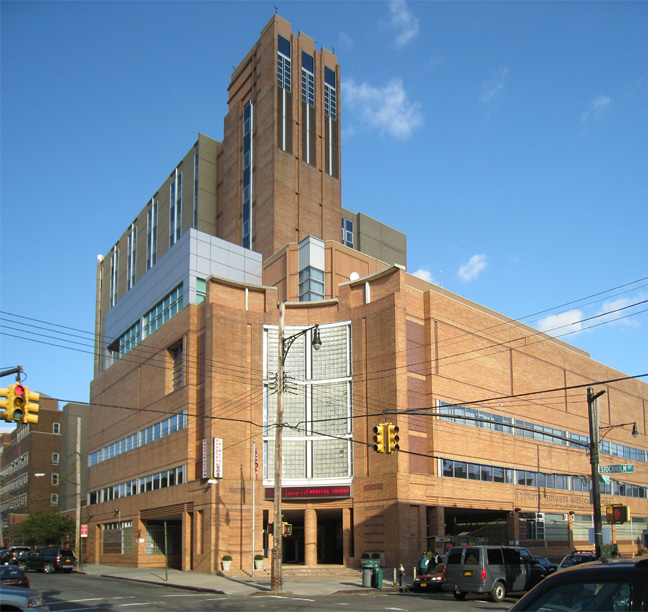

Geography
- Location: 374 Stockholm Street; Brooklyn, NY 11237, Bushwick, Brooklyn, New York City, New York, United States
- Coordinates: 40°42′15″N 73°55′2″W

Services
- Emergency department: Yes
- Beds: 350

History
- Founded: 1889

Links
- Website: www.wyckoffhospital.org
- Lists: Hospitals in New York State
- Other links: Hospitals in Brooklyn

Wyckoff Heights Medical Center is a 350-bed teaching and safety net hospital located in the Wyckoff Heights section of Bushwick, Brooklyn. The hospital is an academic affiliate of the Weill Cornell College of Medicine, the New York Medical College and NYIT College of Osteopathic Medicine. The primary goal of the center is to train future physicians that are qualified medically and personably. Wyckoff Heights is one of only ten hospitals left in New York City to operate as a stand-alone facility.

== History ==
In 1887 the German Hospital Society of Brooklyn was organized by the Plattdeutscher Volksfest-Verein for the purpose of raising funds, purchasing land, and constructing a hospital to serve the large German immigrant community in Brooklyn.

The hospital opened its doors in 1899 as the German Hospital of Brooklyn, but was renamed Wyckoff Heights Hospital after World War I because of anti-German sentiments and eventually renamed Wyckoff Heights Medical Center.

During the 1990s, Wyckoff was managed by Preferred Health Network.

== Designations and achievements ==
Wyckoff Heights Medical Center is a New York State designated Primary Stroke Center and Level III Perinatal Center.

The American Heart Association and the American Stroke Association awarded the hospital with a "Silver Performance Achievement Award" in 2011 and a "Gold Plus Performance Achievement Award" in 2012.

Surgeons at Wyckoff Medical Center were the first in the state and surrounding Tri-state area to perform an artificial disc implant into a spine.

In 2006 Wyckoff Heights Medical Center received top honors from HSS Incorporated (a medical coding software developer) for the hospital's medical coding practices, as part of the third-annual Top 200 Coding Hospital Report.

== Community programs ==
Asthmapolis

Wyckoff Heights Medical Center is the first New York area hospital to use Asthmapolis. Marketed as the BreathEasy program, the hospital provides participants with the smartphone application and a snap-on sensor that tracks how often participants use their asthma inhaler. Wyckoff physicians receive immediate notification of a patient's worsening condition. The program is offered through the hospital's pediatric department.

== Patient safety ratings ==
In 2022, the hospital received a C rating in safety grades from Leapfrog Group.

== 2026 ICE arrest incident ==
On May 2, 2026, masked United States Immigration and Customs Enforcement (ICE) agents arrested a Nigerian undocumented immigrant named Chidozie Wilson Okeke, detaining him in his car in Bushwick, Brooklyn. Okeke struggled with officers during the arrest, which left him with injuries. ICE agents then took Okeke to the Wyckoff Heights Medical Center to provide him access to treatment.

Locals spotted the ICE agents and contacted community activists, prompting around 200 protesters to assemble outside the hospital. An ICE agent pepper sprayed the crowd while other agents dragged Okeke, who appeared to be "semi-conscious", from the emergency room across the pavement to an ICE vehicle that was obstructed by protesters. Clashes ensued between protesters and the New York City Police Department (NYPD), leading to injuries on both sides and resulting in eight to nine protesters being arrested and charged. Once Okeke was in the vehicle, ICE agents drove through the crowd, hitting a protester on the way out.

The NYPD has been accused by government officials, protesters, and community members of facilitating ICE's arrest of Okeke. As a result, critics have questioned Mayor Zohran Mamdani's pledges to uphold the city's sanctuary policies made throughout his mayoral campaign and incumbency. Mamdani denied that the NYPD was directly collaborating with ICE, but promised to examine response protocols regarding immigration enforcement.
