= Flushing Hospital Medical Center =

Hospital in Queens, New York

Coordinates: 40.7554°N 73.8166°W

- MediSys Health Network

Geography
- Location: 4500 Parsons Blvd, Flushing, New York, United States

Organization
- Care system: Non-profit Hospital
- Affiliated university: American University of the Caribbean; New York Institute of Technology College of Osteopathic Medicine; St. George's University School of Medicine; SUNY Downstate School of Medicine; Ross University School of Medicine

Services
- Emergency department: Yes
- Beds: 293

History
- Founded: 1884

Links
- Website: https://flushinghospital.org/
- Lists: Hospitals in New York State

Flushing Hospital Medical Center (also known as Flushing Hospital) is one of the oldest hospitals in New York City. It survived a 1999 bankruptcy and subsequently affiliated first with the New York Presbyterian Hospital and then with the MediSys Health Network. The hospital is also currently affiliated with the New York Institute of Technology College of Osteopathic Medicine to provide clinical rotations for the college's osteopathic medicine students.

== Designations ==
The hospital is a New York State designated primary stroke center and a Level 3 Perinatal Center.

== History ==
Established in 1884, in 1951 the hospital celebrated the birth of its 5,000th baby.

By 1993 Flushing Hospital was described as "an unaffiliated community hospital that is struggling financially." On that basis, the hospital affiliated with Preferred Health Network, then-described as "a network of hospitals and health centers based in Brooklyn."

A voluntary hospital, Flushing's nursing staff was particularly affected in early 2012 by financial difficulties, having been listed in 2011 as being among six NYC hospitals "in critical condition" - at the time it was part of the MediSys Health Network.

The hospital's original major building, constructed in 1913, was demolished in 1975.

== Affiliations ==
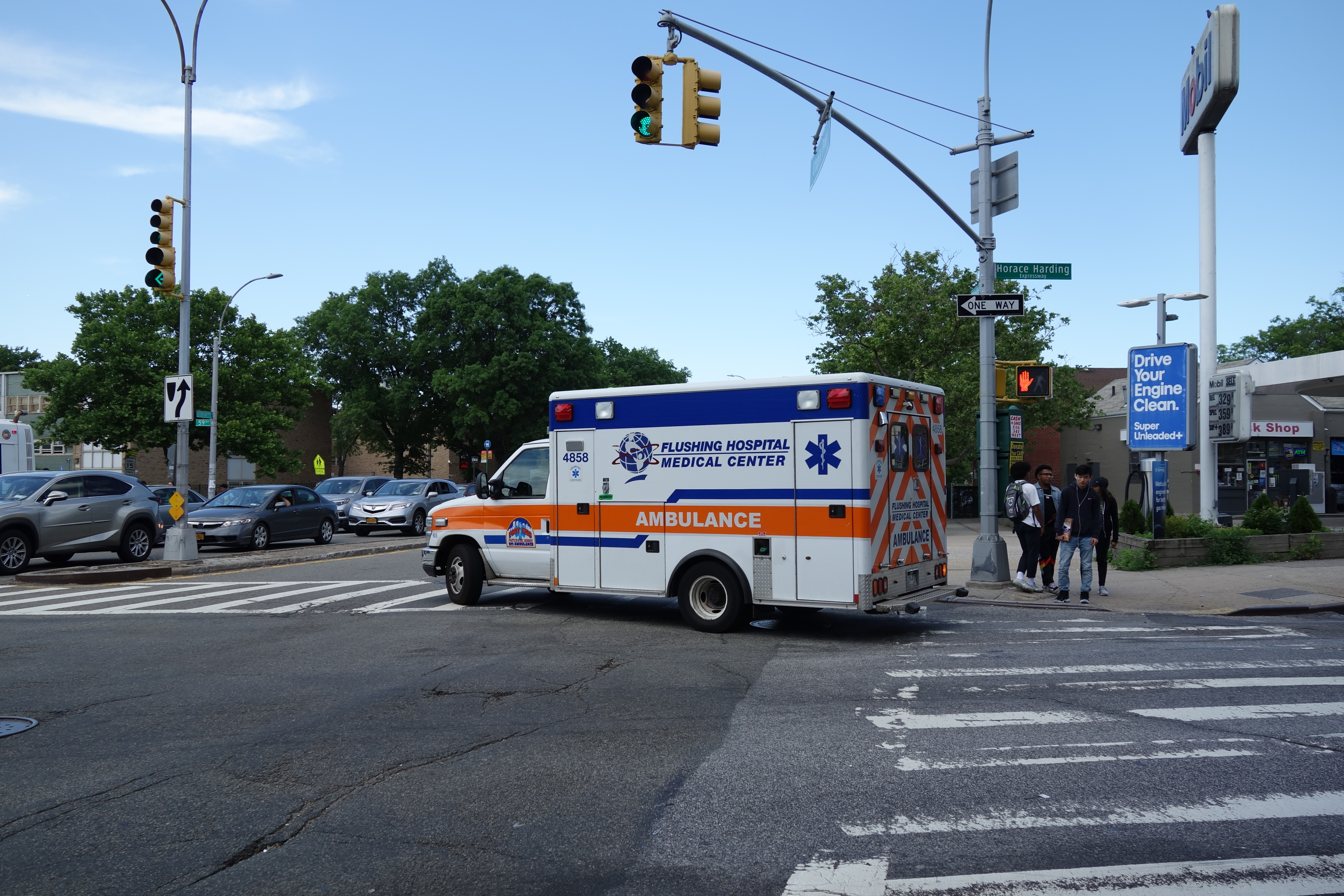
A Flushing Hospital ambulance turning from Horace Harding Expressway north onto Utopia Parkway in Auburndale, Queens

MediSys Health Network owns and operates Jamaica Hospital Medical Center and Flushing Hospital Medical Center. Its prior affiliations and management include the New York Presbyterian Healthcare Network.

Parsons Hospital became a division of Flushing. The latter was acquired by New York Hospital in April 1996.
