= List of hospitals in Brooklyn =

This is a list of hospitals in Brooklyn, sorted by hospital name, with addresses and a brief description of their formation and development. Hospital names were obtained from these sources. A list of hospitals in New York State is also available.

== Hospitals ==
=== A-I ===
- Brookdale University Hospital and Medical Center, 555 Rockaway Parkway, now also 1 Brookdale Plaza, Brooklyn. Opened as Brownsville and East New York Hospital on April 11, 1921, renamed Beth-El Hospital in 1932, renamed Brookdale Hospital Center in 1963, renamed Brookdale Hospital Medical Center in 1971, then renamed Brookdale University Hospital and Medical Center.
- Brooklyn Hospital Center, 121 DeKalb Avenue, Brooklyn. Founded as Brooklyn City Hospital in 1845, renamed Brooklyn Hospital on February 10, 1883, merged with Caledonian Hospital and renamed Brooklyn Hospital-Caledonian Hospital in 1982, renamed Brooklyn Hospital in 1983, renamed Brooklyn Hospital Center in 1990. Its outpatient clinics include the site of the former Cumberland Hospital several blocks away.
- Brooklyn V.A. Medical Center, 800 Poly Place, Bay Ridge, Brooklyn. Opened in 1950.
- Coney Island Hospital, 2601 Ocean Parkway, Brooklyn. Opened as a first aid station near West 3rd Street in 1875, moved to a rented building on Sea Breeze Avenue and named Reception Hospital on May 12, 1902, but also called Sea Breeze Hospital and Coney Island Reception Hospital, officially part of Kings County Hospital, and open only for seasonal care from April through October. Moved to its current location, opened full-time, and renamed Coney Island Hospital on May 18, 1910.
- Interfaith Medical Center, 1545 Atlantic Avenue, Brooklyn. Formed in 1982 by merger and consolidation of Jewish Hospital and Medical Center and St. John's Episcopal Hospital of Brooklyn in 1982. Former Jewish Hospital at 555 Prospect Place is now apartments.

=== K-M ===
- Kings County Hospital Center, 451 Clarkson Avenue, Brooklyn. Opened in 1837. In 1955 absorbed Kingston Avenue Hospital, which opened in 1891 as a Hospital for Contagious Diseases.
- Maimonides Medical Center, 4802 10th Avenue, Brooklyn. Its constituent institutions were The New Utrecht Dispensary, which opened at 1275 37th Street in 1911 was renamed Israel Hospital when it became a hospital; Zion Hospital, which opened at 2140 Cropsey Avenue in 1911; and Beth Moses Hospital, which opened at 404 Hart Street on October 24, 1920. Israel and Zion Hospitals merged in May 1920 to form Israel Zion Hospital and opened at 10th Avenue and 48th Street on September 17, 1922. Israel Zion merged with Beth Moses Hospital to form Maimonides Hospital on July 30, 1947, and acute medical services were consolidated at the Israel Zion location. Renamed Maimonides Medical Center in 1996.
- Maimonides Midwood Community Hospital, 2525 Kings Highway, Brooklyn. Founded as Madison Park Hospital in 1929, renamed Hospital of the Jacques Loewe Foundation, renamed Community Hospital of Brooklyn in the mid-1960s, became New York Community Hospital when it was acquired by New York-Presbyterian Hospital in 1997. By 2015, it had dropped its affiliation with NewYork Presbyterian, instead affiliating with Maimonides. In 2022, the name was officially changed to Maimonides Midwood Community Hospital.
- Mount Sinai Brooklyn, 3201 Kings Highway. Opened as Kings Highway Hospital in 1955, renamed Beth Israel-Kings Highway Division when acquired by Beth Israel Medical Center in 1995, renamed Beth Israel Brooklyn on February 27, 2012, renamed Mount Sinai Beth Israel Brooklyn on January 22, 2014 following the merger of Mount Sinai and Beth Israel, renamed Mount Sinai Brooklyn on July 20, 2015.

=== N ===
- NewYork-Presbyterian Brooklyn Methodist Hospital, 506 6th Street, Brooklyn. Incorporated on May 27, 1881, opened as the Methodist Episcopal Hospital in the City of Brooklyn on December 15, 1887, renamed Methodist Hospital of Brooklyn in 1939, renamed New York Methodist hospital upon its affiliation with New York-Presbyterian Hospital in 1993.
- NYU Langone Hospital- Brooklyn, 150 55th Street, Brooklyn. Founded by Sister Elisabeth Fedde as the Norwegian Lutheran Deaconess Home and Hospital at 441 4th Avenue in 1883, moved to 4520 4th Avenue in 1889, merged with Lutheran Hospital of Manhattan to form Our Savior's Lutheran Hospital in July 1956 and then renamed Lutheran Medical Center, moved to its current site in 1977, renamed NYU Lutheran Medical Center upon its affiliation with N.Y.U. in 2015 and then renamed again to NYU Langone Hospital- Brooklyn in 2017.

=== O-Z ===
- SUNY Downstate Medical Center, consisting of three parts:
  - SUNY Downstate College of Medicine
  - SUNY Downstate at Bay Ridge, 9036 Seventh Avenue, an outpatient clinic, formerly Victory Memorial Hospital
  - University Hospital of Brooklyn, 450 Clarkson Avenue, Brooklyn. Founded as the Brooklyn German General Dispensary at 132 Court Street in March 1856, moved to 145 Court Street in 1857, renamed the St. John's Hospital on November 6, 1857, renamed Long Island College Hospital on February 4, 1858, incorporated March 6, 1858, moved to the Perry Mansion on Henry Street between Amity and Pacific Streets May 1, 1858. The college and the hospital separated in 1930, the college was re-chartered as the Long Island College of Medicine in 1931 and merged into the State University of New York on April 5, 1950. The hospital opened in the 1960s.
- Woodhull Medical and Mental Health Center, 760 Broadway at Flushing Avenue, Brooklyn. Named for Richard M. Woodhull, the original owner of the site, by Victor Morales, a local student at Intermediate School 318, who traced his origins. Opened on May 24, 1982.
- Wyckoff Heights Medical Center, 374 Stockholm Street, Brooklyn. Founded as German Hospital in 1889, dedicated at St. Nicholas Avenue and Stanhope Street on May 21, 1899, and opened later that year. Renamed Wyckoff Heights Hospital because of anti-German sentiment after World War 1, then renamed Wyckoff Heights Medical Center. The address has changed because of additional buildings, but it is still on the original block.

== Closed hospitals ==
=== A-Bo ===
- A.H. Wade's Hospital, 493 Greene Avenue, BrooklynIt was Doctor Wade's private hospital, and now houses apartments.
- Adelphi Hospital, 50 Greene Avenue, Brooklyn; now apartments.
- Baptist Medical Center, 2749 Linden Boulevard, Brooklyn. Later became a nursing home, demolished in 2013.
- Bay Ridge Hospital, 437 Ovington Avenue, Brooklyn. Now St. Nicholas Nursing Home.
- Bedford Dispensary and Hospital, Brooklyn. Renamed Ocean Hill Memorial Dispensary and Hospital in 1920.
- Bensonhurst Maternity Hospital, 7801 Bay Parkway.
- Beth Moses Hospital, 404 Hart Street, Brooklyn. Demolished for city housing. See Maimonides Medical Center, in the section on hospitals in Brooklyn above.
- Bethany Deaconess Hospital, 237 St. Nicholas Avenue, Brooklyn. Founded in 1901, building opened on September 16, 1902. Acquired by Wyckoff Heights Hospital in 1966 and renamed the Bethany Pavilion, closed in 1974, left vacant, demolished in 1985, and replaced by senior housing.
- Boro Park General Hospital, 4413 to 4421 Fifteenth Ave, Brooklyn.1940s. Boro Park Maternity Hospital (and subsequently Brooklyn Doctors Hospital) was part of this (4420 15th Avenue). Closed. Now Girls Yeshiva.
- Boro Park Maternity Hospital. Subsequently Doctor's Hospital. Closed. See Boro Park General Hospital.

=== Br ===
- Bradford Street Hospital, 109-111 Bradford Street, Brooklyn
- Brooklyn Eastern District Hospital, 110 South 3rd Street, Brooklyn. Opened as the Williamsburg Dispensary in 1851, renamed in 1872.
- Brooklyn Eye and Ear Hospital, 29 Greene Avenue, Brooklyn. Opened in 1868. Now a nursing home.
- Brooklyn Hebrew Maternity Hospital, 1395 Eastern Parkway, Brooklyn Its prior name was Maternity Hospital of Brownsville and East New York. Brooklyn Women's Hospital August 1, 1930 through 1960s.
- Brooklyn Home for Consumptives, Kingston Avenue and St. John's Place, Brooklyn
- Brooklyn Homeopathic Hospital, 105-111 Cumberland Street, Brooklyn. Opened on February 13, 1873, in the former building of the Cumberland Street Orphan Asylum, which moved out in 1870. Rebuilt in 1918, renamed Cumberland Hospital in 1922, had an address of 35 and then 39 Auburn Place, closed as a hospital on August 24, 1983, became an outpatient clinic called Neighborhood Family Care Center, now Cumberland Diagnostic Treatment Center, address 100 North Portland Avenue, and part of Brooklyn Hospital Center.
- Brooklyn Homeopathic Lying-In Asylum, 775 Washington Avenue, Brooklyn. See Prospect Heights Hospital, below.
- Brooklyn Maternity Hospital, 775 Washington Avenue, Brooklyn. See Prospect Heights Hospital, below.
- Brooklyn Nursery and Infants Hospital, 396 Herkimer Street, Brooklyn.
- Brooklyn State Hospital, Brooklyn. Now Kingsborough Psychiatric Hospital.
- Brooklyn Throat Hospital Opened in 1859, incorporated April 26, 1889, renamed Williamsburgh Hospital in 1899, subsequently renamed Williamsburg General Hospital. Closed.
- Brooklyn Women's Hospital, 1395 Eastern Parkway, Brooklyn (which previously housed Brooklyn Hebrew Maternity Hospital). Opened on August 1, 1930. +Closed 1960s.

=== Bu-E ===
- Bushwick Hospital, Putnam Avenue at Howard Avenue, Brooklyn. Founded in 1891, closed in the late 1950s, now a New York State facility for youth.
- Caledonian Hospital, 10 Saint Paul's Place, Brooklyn. Merged with Brooklyn Hospital in 1982 and closed in 2003. The building is now co-op apartments.
- Carson C. Peck Memorial Hospital, 570 Crown Street, Brooklyn. Opened in 1919, merged with Methodist Hospital of Brooklyn in the 1970s. Later a nursing home and in 1985 became Crown Palace Hotel. Demolished in 2003 and replaced by a girl's yeshiva.
- Cholera Hospital, Hamilton Avenue and Van Brunt Street, Brooklyn. Opened in July 1866, closed October 1 in the same year.
- Churchill Sanitarium, 716 Marcy Avenue, Brooklyn
- Crown Heights Hospital, Brooklyn 1928-1958 (See Lefferts General)
- Cumberland Hospital, 35 Auburn Place, Brooklyn. Opened as Brooklyn Homeopathic Hospital at 109 Cumberland Street on February 13, 1873. Rebuilt in 1918, renamed Cumberland Hospital in 1922, had an address of 35 and then 39 Auburn Place, closed as a hospital on August 24, 1983, became an outpatient clinic called Neighborhood Family Care Center, now Cumberland Diagnostic Treatment Center, address 100 North Portland Avenue, and part of New York City Health and Hospitals .
- Doctor's Hospital of Brooklyn (Brooklyn Doctor's Hospital, privately owned). 4413-4421 15th Avenue, Brooklyn. Closed. School. see Boro Park Maternity Hospital.
- Eastern District Dispensary and Hospital, Brooklyn. Opened in 1851.
- Emanuel Unity Hospital, Unity Hospital merged with Emanuel Hospital, later known as Unity hospital. Closed 1978; now an apartment building, 1545 St. John's Place.
- Evangelical Deaconess Hospital, 629 Chauncey Street, Brooklyn. Opened 1931. Closed 1968. Now a homeless shelter.

=== F-H ===
- Flatbush General Hospital, 719 Linden Boulevard, Brooklyn.
- German Hospital Dispensary of Brooklyn, St. Nicholas Avenue and Stockholm Street, Brooklyn. (See Wyckoff Heights Medical Center.)
- German Hospital of Brooklyn. Opened in 1879.

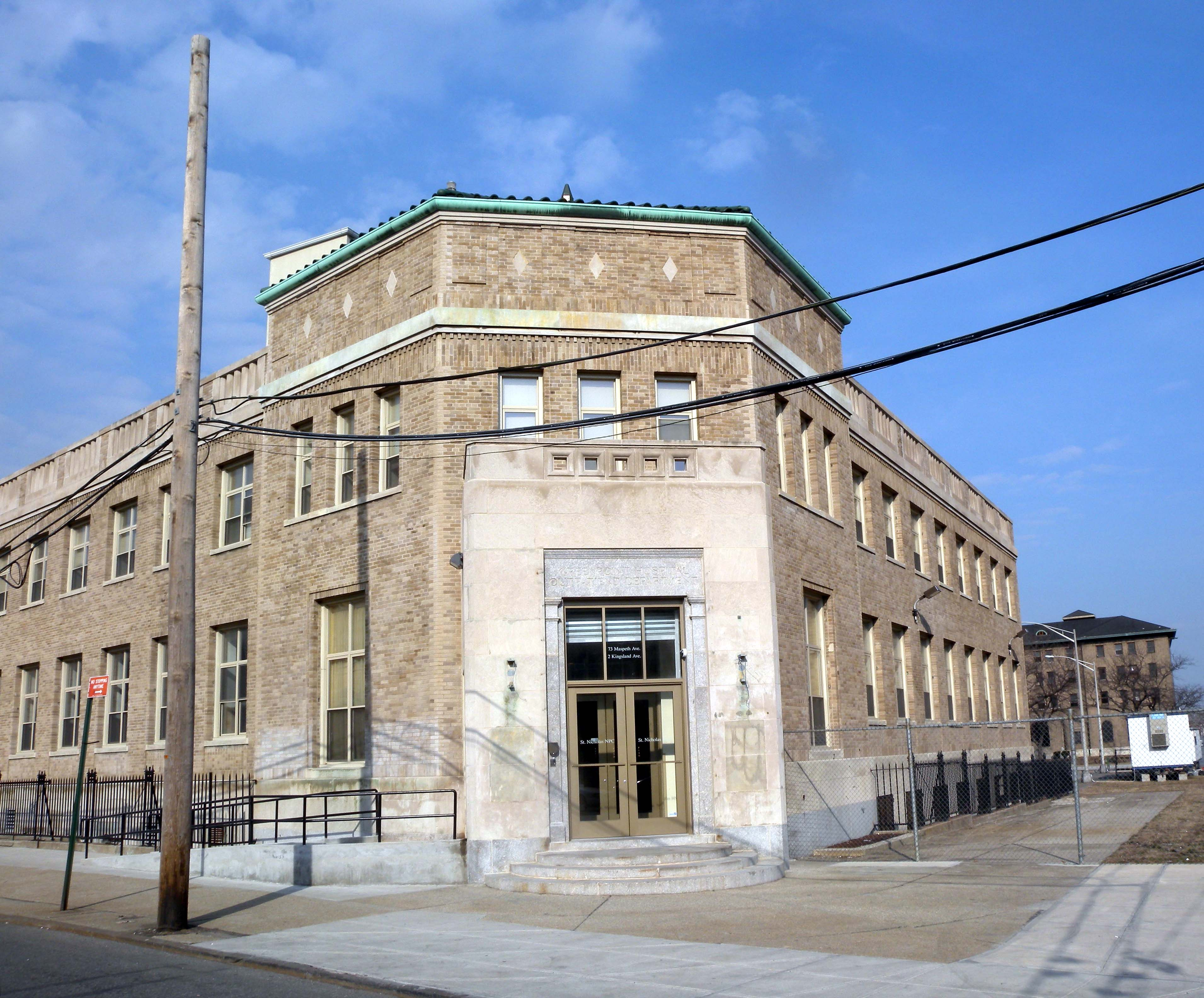
Greenpoint Hospital

- Greenpoint Hospital, 300 Skillman Avenue, Brooklyn. Opened in 1915, closed in 1982. Now the main building of Greenpoint Renaissance Enterprise Corporation, a consortium of neighborhood organizations.
- Hamilton Hospital, Brooklyn.
- Harbor Hospital, Cropsey Avenue at 23rd Avenue, Brooklyn. Demolished 2016.
- Holy Family Hospital, 155 Dean Street, Brooklyn. Founded in 1868, in 1993 replaced by Brooklyn Diocese's Bishop Mugavero nursing home.
- Homeopathic Hospital, Brooklyn. (1878)
- Hospital for Contagious Diseases, Brooklyn. Opened in 1881.
- Hospital of the Holy Name, Brooklyn.

=== I-K ===
- Interboro General Hospital, 2749 Linden Boulevard, Brooklyn. Converted into a nursing home, demolished in 2013.
- Interfaith Medical Center, the 1982-formed result of Jewish Hospital of Brooklyn, initially the larger of the pair, reducing its number of beds per a state directive, and merging with St. John's Episcopal Hospital of Brooklyn. Both sites remained open, until the combined Interfaith closed and both sites became apartments.
- Israel Hospital, 1275 37th Street, Brooklyn. See Maimonides Medical Center, in the section on hospitals in Brooklyn above.
- Israel Zion Hospital, 10th Avenue and 49th Street, Brooklyn. See Maimonides Medical Center, in the section on hospitals in Brooklyn above.

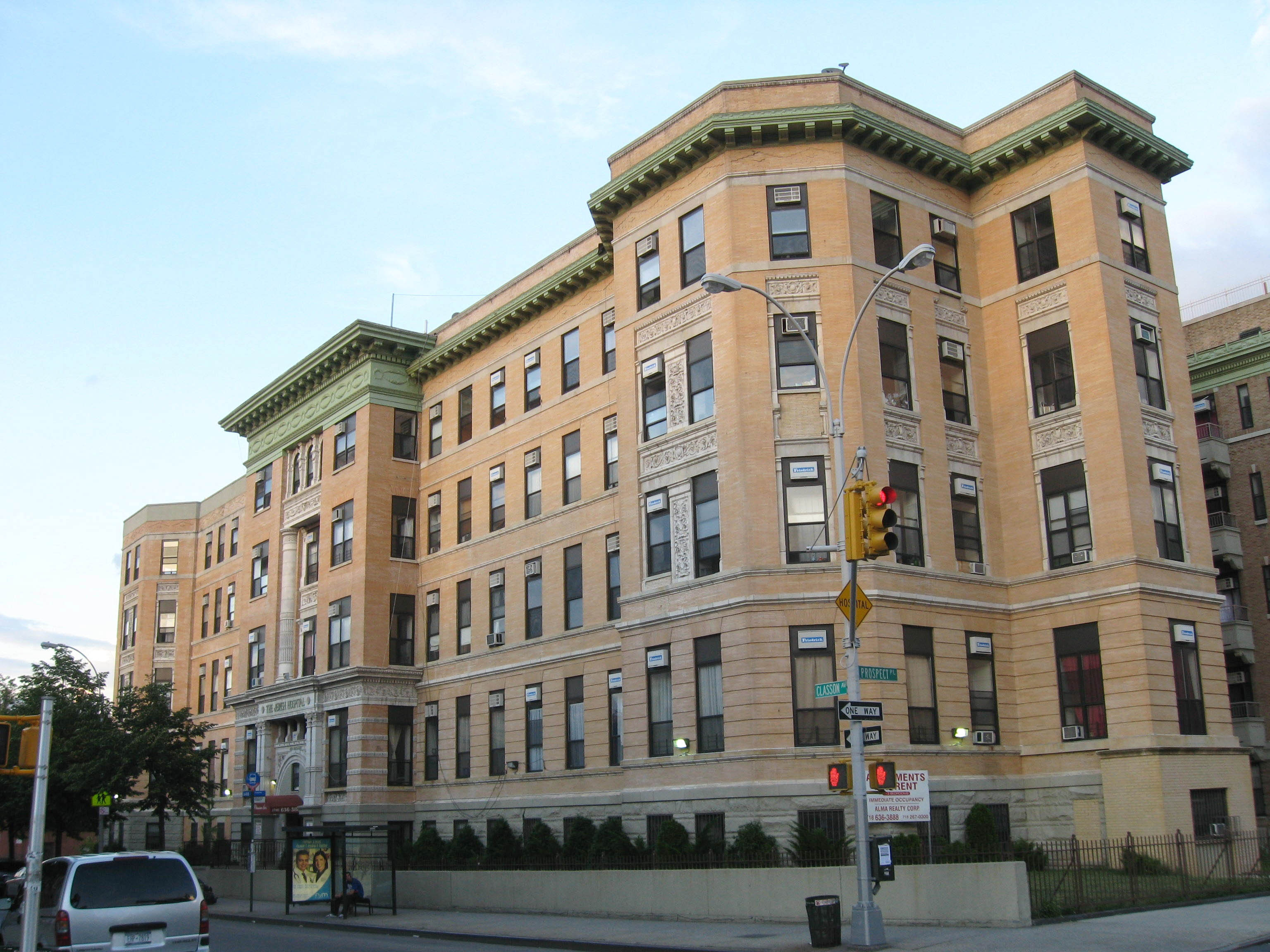
Jewish Hospital of Brooklyn

- Jewish Hospital of Brooklyn, 555 Prospect Place, Brooklyn. Opened as a dispensary at 70 Johnson Avenue, incorporated as Jewish Hospital on November 9, 1901, opened on December 17, 1906, renamed Jewish Hospital and Medical Center of Brooklyn by 1968, merged with St. John's Episcopal Hospital of Brooklyn to become Interfaith Medical Center in 1982. Each site remained open. Both buildings are now apartments.
- Jewish Sanitarium and Hospital for Chronic Diseases, East 49th Street at Rutland Road, Brooklyn. See Kingsbrook Jewish Hospital, in the section on hospitals in Brooklyn above.
- Jewish Sanitarium for Incurables, East 49th Street at Rutland Road, Brooklyn. See Kingsbrook Jewish Hospital, in the section on hospitals in Brooklyn above.
- Kings Highway Hospital, Brooklyn. See Mount Sinai Brooklyn, in the section on hospitals in Brooklyn above.
- Kingsbrook Jewish Medical Center, 585 Schenectady Avenue, Brooklyn. Opened on April 24, 1929 as the Jewish Sanitarium for Incurables, renamed the Jewish Sanitarium and Hospital for Chronic Diseases in 1933, renamed Jewish Chronic Disease Hospital in 1954, became an acute medical care hospital and renamed Kingsbrook Jewish Medical Center in 1968, and closed as a hospital on November 30, 2023. It still provides outpatient, emergency, and nursing hgome care.
- Kingston Avenue Hospital, Brooklyn. opened in 1891 as Hospital for Contagious Diseases; absorbed by Kings County Hospital Center in 1955.
- Kingsway Hospital, 4422 Avenue J, Brooklyn; previously Mayflower Hospital.

=== L-M ===
- Lefferts General Hospital, 460 Lefferts Avenue, Brooklyn. 1958–1978. Building demolished, replaced by a girl's Yeshiva.

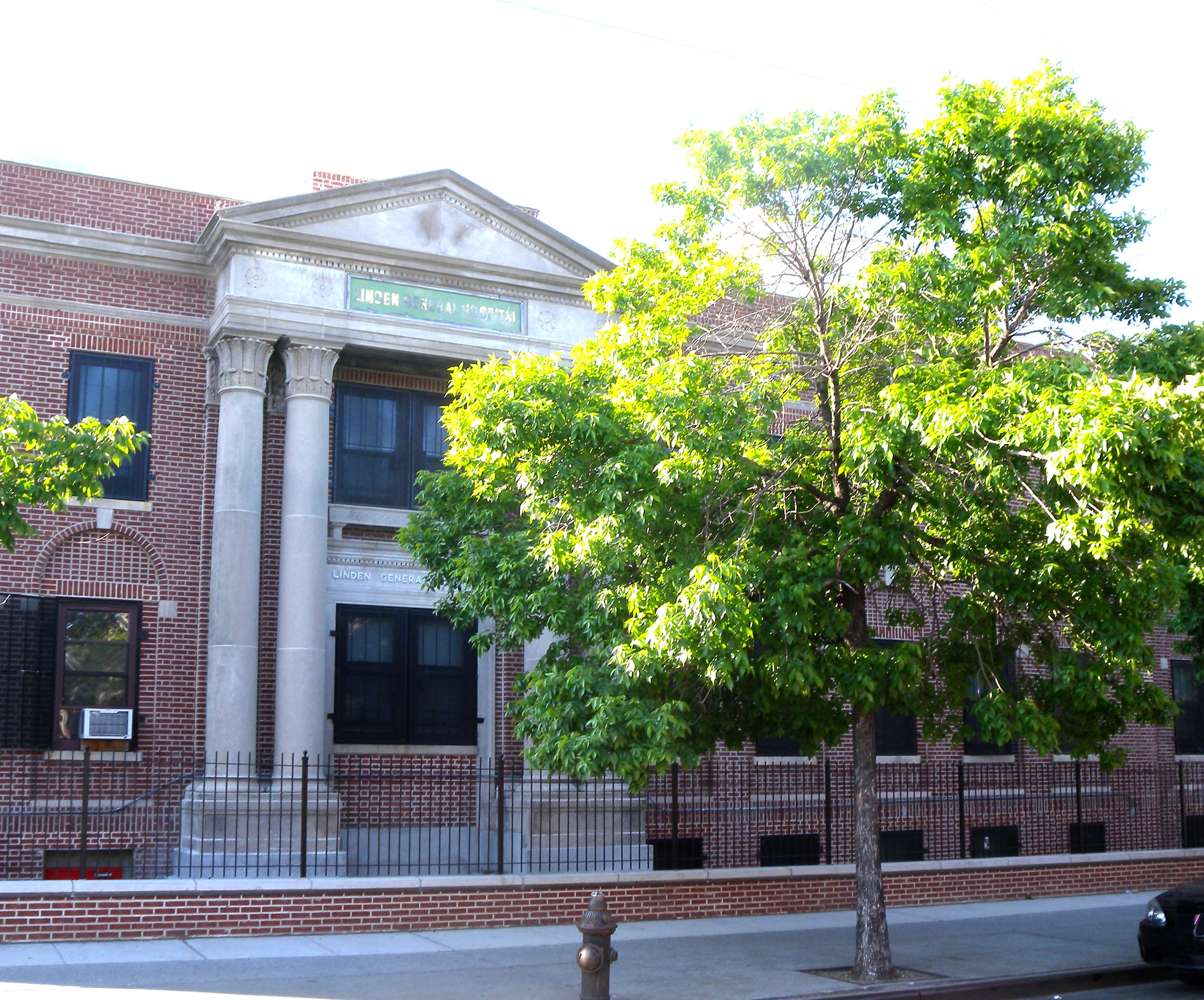
Linden General Hospital

- Linden General Hospital, 501 New Lots Avenue, Brooklyn. Now a homeless shelter.
- Long Island College Hospital, 339 Hicks Street, Brooklyn. Founded as the Brooklyn German General Dispensary at 132 Court Street in March 1856, moved to 145 Court Street in 1857, renamed the St. John's Hospital on November 6, 1857, renamed Long Island College Hospital on February 4, 1858, incorporated March 6, 1858, moved to the Perry Mansion on Henry Street between Amity and Pacific Streets May 1, 1858, closed in 2014.
- Lutheran Hospital of Brooklyn, 22 Junius Street, Brooklyn. Opened in 1881, closed on August 15, 1979. buildings razed in the 1980s.
- Madison Park Hospital, 2525 Kings Highway, Brooklyn. Renamed Community Hospital of Brooklyn in the early 1960s, renamed New York Community Hospital when it was acquired by New York-Presbyterian Hospital in 1997.
- Maternity Hospital of Brownsville and East New York, 1395 Eastern Parkway. Later Brooklyn Hebrew Maternity Hospital and then Brooklyn Women's Hospital (1930-1960s).
- Mayflower Hospital, Kings Highway and Avenue J (Later Kingsway Hospital).
- Menorah Maternity Hospital, Rockaway Parkway & Avenue A, Brooklyn.
- Midwood Hospital, 19 Winthrop Street, Brooklyn. Opened 1907 as Midwood Sanitarium. Rebuilt and renamed 1929 after a fire. Open at least til 1973. Was St. John's Elementary School (a private school) from 1979 to 2000. Now in use by CAMBA, Inc. for social services.

=== N-R ===
- Norwegian Lutheran Deaconess Hospital, 4520 Fourth Avenue, Brooklyn. See N.Y.U. Lutheran Hospital, in the section on hospitals in Brooklyn above.
- Ocean Hill Memorial Dispensary and Hospital, 343-345 Ralph Ave, Brooklyn. Originally named Bedford Dispensary and Hospital, name changed in 1920.
- Prospect Heights Hospital, 775 Washington Ave, Brooklyn. Founded as the Brooklyn Homeopathic Lying-In Asylum in 1871, renamed Brooklyn Maternity Hospital on June 21, 1875, renamed Prospect Heights Hospital on September 12, 1902. Its motto was to "To aid the friendless; to save the fallen." The institution depended on charitable donations and private funds. Claimed to be "the first training school for nurses organized in the United States." Had 68 beds in 1916. Merged with Long Island College Hospital in the 1960s. Now senior housing.
- Reception Hospital. This name was used for a hospital on Sea Breeze Avenue in Brooklyn that transferred patients to Kings County Hospital and then became Coney Island Hospital. (A hospital with the same name was located in the Storehouse Building on Blackwell's Island that transferred patients to the city, Metropolitan, and Central and Neurological Hospitals on Blackwell's Island.)
- Riverdale Hospital, Brooklyn. 501 New Lots Ave. (See Linden General)

=== S ===
- St. Catharine's Hospital, 133 or 250 Bushwick Avenue, Brooklyn. Founded in 1869. Now senior housing.
- St. Cecilia's Maternity Hospital, 484 Humboldt Street, Brooklyn. Now apartments.
- St. Charles Hospital, 277 Hicks Street, Brooklyn, now apartments.
- St. Christopher's Hospital for Babies, 283 Hicks Street, Brooklyn. Established in 1896.
- St. Giles Hospital, 1346 President Street, Brooklyn. Opened by Sister Sarah, an Episcopal nun, on Degraw Street in 1891, moved to President Street in 1916, closed in 1978. The hospital cared for crippled children, many of whom had had polio, and the polio vaccine made it unnecessary. Now St. Mark's School, a Catholic day school.
- St. John's Episcopal Hospital, 1545 Atlantic Avenue, Brooklyn. Founded in 1871, merged with Jewish Hospital and Medical Center of Brooklyn to become Interfaith Medical Center in 1982. Both sites remained open, although the larger of the two, Jewish, reduced its number of beds to comply with a state directive.
- St. Mary's Female Hospital, 155 Dean Street, Brooklyn. Maternity.
- St. Mary's Hospital, 170 Buffalo Avenue, Brooklyn. Opened in 1877, closed October 4, 2005.
- St. Peter's Hospital, 380 Henry Street, Brooklyn. Founded on September 23, 1864. Now a Cobble Hill Nursing Home.
- Samaritan Hospital, 759 President Street, Brooklyn. Founded in 1906.
- Seney Hospital, Brooklyn. An alternative but unofficial name for New York Methodist Hospital. See the section on hospitals in Brooklyn above.
- Shore Road Hospital, 9000 Shore Road, Brooklyn. Opened 1924. Demolished 1977. Now senior housing.
- Sister Elizabeth Maternity Hospital, 362 51st Street, Brooklyn. Now a social services agency.
- Swedish Hospital, 1350 Bedford Avenue, Brooklyn. Opened at 126 Rogers Avenue on June 24, 1906, moved to 1350 Bedford Avenue on October 3, 1939, closed in September 1975. Now apartments.

=== T-Z ===
- Unity Hospital, 1545 St. John's Place, Brooklyn. merged with late-1800s formed Emanuel Hospital, becoming Emanuel Unity Hospital, then becoming known as Unity Hospital. Closed 1978; Now an apartment building.
- Victory Memorial Hospital, 9036 7th Avenue, Bay Ridge, Brooklyn. Opened in 1927, closed in 2009, now SUNY Downstate at Bay Ridge, an outpatient clinic that is part of SUNY Downstate Medical Center. It was known locally as the "Baby Hospital."
- Williamsburg General Hospital. 757 Bushwick Avenue. Opened in 1859 as Brooklyn Throat Hospital, incorporated April 26, 1889, renamed Williamsburgh Hospital in 1899, subsequently renamed Williamsburg General Hospital. Now apartments.
- Williamsburg Maternity Hospital, 753 Bushwick Avenue, Brooklyn.
- Williamsburgh Hospital. Sometimes referred to as Williamsburg Hospital. Initially Brooklyn Throat Hospital, then Williamsburgh, then Williamsburg General. "The H at the end of the name" was dropped in 1855.
- Zion Hospital, 2140 Cropsey Avenue, Brooklyn. See Maimonides Medical Center, in the section on hospitals in Brooklyn above.

== See also ==
- List of hospitals in New York (state)
  - List of hospitals in New York City
    - List of hospitals in the Bronx
    - List of hospitals in Manhattan
    - List of hospitals in Queens
    - List of hospitals in Staten Island
