= Stanley Green (historian) =

American historian of theatre and film (1923–1990)

- Born: May 29, 1923; Brooklyn, New York, US
- Died: December 12, 1990 (aged 67); Brooklyn, US
- Occupations: Historian of theatre and film

Stanley Green (May 29, 1923 – December 12, 1990) was an American historian of theatre and film. He was also a writer on music who worked as an editor at Stereo Review, and was a radio personality who hosted the WBAI radio program "The World of Musical Comedy".

== Life and career ==
Stanley Green was born in Brooklyn, New York, on May 29, 1923. He attended Union College in Schenectady, New York, where he graduated in 1943. He joined the United States Army and received further education in the Army Specialized Training Program at the University of Nebraska. He then served in the United States Army Signal Corps in the Pacific War during World War II.

From 1957 to 1963 Green worked as an editor at Stereo Review. He also wrote the liner notes to more than 100 albums, and wrote articles for Atlantic Monthly, The New York Times, Saturday Review, Musical America, and Variety among other publications. He was the author of ten books and numerous periodical articles on musicals and film. He also worked as a guest lecturer at numerous institutions.

In 1961 Green joined the staff of WBAI radio as the host/commentator for the radio program "The World of Musical Comedy". That program was broadcast on Wednesday nights and Monday mornings through 1965. Green penned the play A Salute to the American Musical Theater for the Manhattan School of Music in 1967. That work was performed at the Waldorf Astoria New York, and twice at the White House. He also wrote the script to the program "The Music of Kurt Weill" which was performed at Lincoln Center in 1969.

The Oxford Companion to American Theatre states that "Green became a leading modern authority of musical theatre."

Green died of leukemia on December 12, 1990, at Caledonian Hospital in Brooklyn.

== Partial list of books ==
- The World of Musical Comedy (first published 1960; revised editions published in 1974, 1980, and 1984)
- The Rodgers and Hammerstein Story (1963; revised edition published in 1980)
- Ring Bells! Sing Songs! Broadway Musicals of the 1930’s (1971; revised edition published in 1982 as Broadway Musicals of the 1930’s)
- Encyclopaedia of the Musical Theater (1976; revised second edition published in 1980)
- Rodgers and Hammerstein Fact Book (1980)
- The Great Clowns of Broadway (1984)
- Broadway Musicals: Show by Show (1985, subsequently republished in many revised editions)
- Hollywood Musicals Year by Year (1990; revised second edition published in 2000)
