= Kingston Avenue Hospital =

Defunct Brooklyn hospital

Geography
- Location: Brooklyn, New York, United States

History
- Former name: Hospital for Contagious Diseases
- Opened: 1891
- Closed: 1955

Links
- Lists: Hospitals in New York State
- Other links: List of hospitals in Brooklyn

Kingston Avenue Hospital for Contagious Diseases opened in 1891 as f; patients were transferred to Kings County Hospital Center in 1955.

== History ==
During a time of polio cases, which included eleven deaths in Brooklyn, a "special pavilion" was built at the hospital. It was used to take in cases where infected children were identified by the health commissioner.

== Controversies ==
A mother claimed that it took going to court to "free" her child from the hospital after "alleging neglect." Twenty-two years later the removal of Kingston's Medical Superintendent became a public matter.
