= NYU Langone Hospital – Brooklyn =

- NYU Langone Health
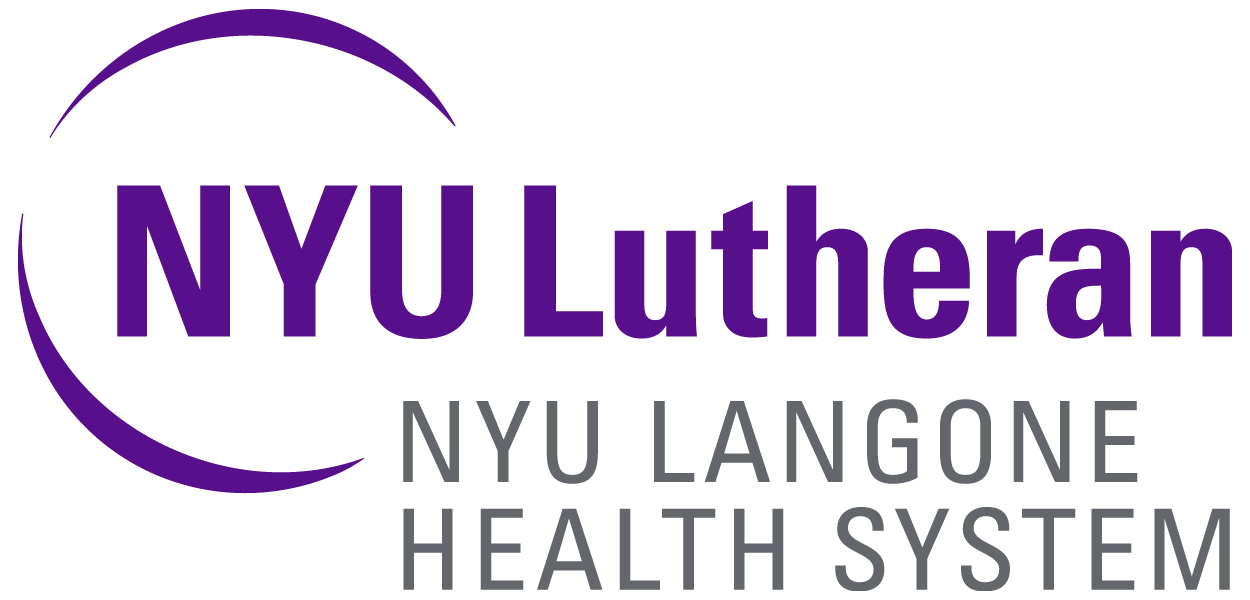

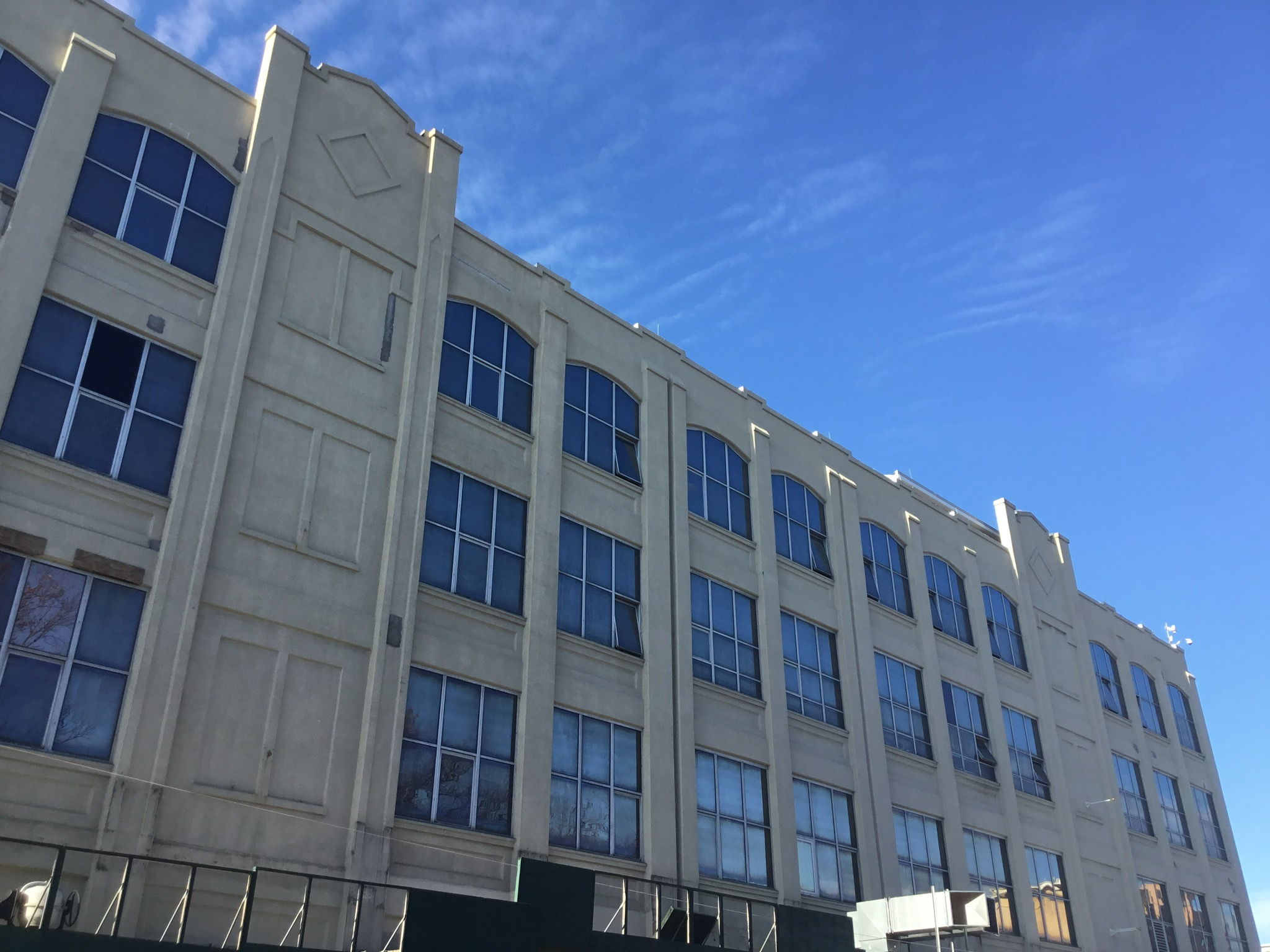
- View of hospital from Second Avenue

- Location within New York City

Geography
- Location: 150 55th Street, Brooklyn, New York, United States
- Coordinates: 40.646578°N 74.020658°W

Organization
- Care system: Private
- Type: Teaching
- Affiliated university: NYU School of Medicine
- Network: NYU Langone Medical Center

Services
- Emergency department: Level I trauma center
- Beds: 450

History
- Former names: Norwegian Lutheran Deaconess Hospital, NYU Lutheran Medical Center
- Founded: 1883

Links
- Website: www.nyulangone.org/locations/nyu-langone-hospital-brooklyn
- Lists: Hospitals in New York State
- Other links: Hospitals in Brooklyn

NYU Langone Hospital – Brooklyn is a 450-bed academic teaching hospital in the Sunset Park neighborhood of Brooklyn, New York City. Formerly named NYU Lutheran Medical Center, it functions as the hub of Lutheran Healthcare, a part of NYU Langone Health.

Many of this hospital's staff members are bilingual/bicultural, speaking languages such as Spanish, Chinese, Arabic, and Russian, reflecting the diversity of Sunset Park. NYU Langone Hospital – Brooklyn offers a range of clinical programs, including a New York State designated Stroke Center, Regional Trauma Center, interventional and therapeutic cardiac catheterization laboratory, orthopedics and a Bariatric Center of Excellence. It treated 75,808 patients in 2011, and has one of the busiest emergency departments in Brooklyn, treating approximately 80,000 patients a year.

== History ==
=== Norwegian Lutheran Deaconess Hospital ===
Lutheran Medical Center was founded in 1883 by Sister Elisabeth Fedde, a Norwegian Lutheran deaconess nurse. By 1890 it had moved from its original William Street (in Red Hook) to 4520 Fourth Avenue. Incremental expansion, beginning in the 1950s, increased the number of beds from under 200 in 1967 to over 400 in 2017. In 1974, the hospital moved to 150 55th Street in Sunset Park in a former factory building.

==== Sister Elizabeth Maternity Hospital ====
Sister Elizabeth Memorial Hospital was a hospital in the Sunset Park neighborhood of Brooklyn, New York. It was located at 362 51st Street, between Third Avenue and Fourth Avenue (40.6460°N 74.0160°W) and was absorbed by the Lutheran Medical Center during the 1980s.

=== Expansion ===
In 2004, the newly added Chinese Unit's 16-bed wing on the fourth floor was described by The New York Daily News as "the only one of its kind in Brooklyn catering specifically to the burgeoning Chinese immigrant population in Sunset Park." Translators were available around the clock, and the hospital provided Halal or kosher meals upon request.

A $2.5 million cardiac catheterization laboratory opened in 2005. The new lab allowed technicians to produce cardiac angiograms, high-quality images of the heart and coronary arteries allowing clots, blockages, and other problems to be diagnosed.

In 2010, the Emergency Department (ED) went through a major expansion, which increased its space and services by 45 percent. The ED expansion included the increase of treatment bays from 30 to 46 and additional exam space for a five-room Quick Care area for a triage, treat, and release program for less urgent conditions. The expansion also included discrete child-friendly pediatric treatment bays, and an upgraded radiology suite located on site brought state-of-the-art technology into the treatment area to improve turnaround time for patients and their families.

Lutheran Medical Center affiliated with NYU Langone in 2015 and was renamed NYU Lutheran Medical Center. In 2017, it was renamed again as NYU Langone Hospital–Brooklyn.

== In popular culture ==
ABC News' documentary series NY Med featured NYU Lutheran in several episodes. Lutheran was also featured on NY ER, which aired on the Oprah Winfrey Network. Lutheran's busy Emergency Department and Trauma Center attracted producers to the southwest Brooklyn hospital. Two Lutheran surgeons, Dr. Charles Guidry and Dr. Tara Margarella, were featured on the show.

== Designations ==
=== New York State Department of Health Designations ===
- ACS verified Level 1 Trauma Center
- Level II Perinatal Center
- Comprehensive Stroke Center
- AIDS Center
- SAFE Program Hospital

== See also ==
- List of hospitals in New York City
