= List of hospitals in New York =

List of hospitals in New York may refer to:

- List of hospitals in New York (state)
- List of hospitals in New York City
