= Philip Mininberg =

Physician, owned Brooklyn Doctors Hospital

Philip M. Mininberg (November 12, 1886 – March 19, 1951) was a Russian-born American obstetrician. He owned and operated Brooklyn Doctors Hospital, formerly the Borough Park Maternity Hospital. He also owned a nurses' residence across the street.

The application of adrenalin on a boy described as born dead was first made on babies by Philip Mininberg.

== Early life ==
Mininberg was born in Poltava, Russian Empire in 1886 and brought to the United States as a child. He received his medical diploma from New York University in 1915.

== Career ==
In 1923, Mininberg successfully revived "by unusual means" a baby boy (a twin to a girl) born apparently dead. The key was that he "pierced the chest wall" and injected a solution of adrenalin directly into the heart. That baby weighed more than two pounds; in 1949, the technique was used on a 15 oz. premature infant.

Mininberg practiced medicine in Brooklyn beginning in 1915. The last 28 years of his life he owned and operated Brooklyn Doctors Hospital (formerly Boro Park Maternity Hospital).

== Family ==
Mininberg died of a stroke in 1951. He was survived by his wife, their three children, four sisters, and a grandson.
