= Gregory Tague =

American multidisciplinary literary scholar

Gregory Frank Tague (born 1957) is an American multidisciplinary literary scholar. He spent most of his career at St. Francis College. He is the founder of the scholarly journal ASEBL Journal and the literary journal Literary Veganism, and general editor for the publisher Bibliotekos.

== Education and career ==
Tague was born in 1957 at Bay Ridge Hospital, Brooklyn. He attended Catholic schools and then St. Francis Preparatory School. He went on to study at Queens College, CUNY; initially earth and environmental science, but then English and American literature. He transferred to Brooklyn College due to the commute, graduating in 1979. He worked full-time in corporate law while at Brooklyn, and continued to work alongside his studies while he read for a Master of Arts at Hunter College, CUNY (graduating 1990); an MPhil at New York University (graduating 1996); and a PhD at New York University. His dissertation was supervised by Frederick R. Karl; it was called The process of the recovery of self in D. H. Lawrence, and accepted in 1998.

During his studies, Tague was an adjunct professor at St. Francis College. He was later hired as a tenure track professor at St. Francis, retiring in 2023 as a full professor in the Department of Literature, Writing and Publishing and the Interdisciplinary Studies program. Throughout his career, Tague's research has concerned moral character, consciousness, and moral behavior. He initially focussed on the English novel, bringing together literary studies and philosophy, but subsequently started to draw upon the biological sciences, including evolutionary biology. In his later career, his work moved towards animal ethics and environmental ethics.

== Editorial projects ==
=== Literary Veganism ===
Tague is the founder and editor of the literary journal Literary Veganism: An Online Journal, which features prose, poetry, and fiction "by, for, and about vegans".

=== ASEBL Journal ===
ASEBL Journal
- Discipline: Literary studies; evolutionary biology; animal studies; ethics
- Language: English
- Edited by: Gregory Tague

Publication details
- History: 2007-2021
- Publisher: St. Francis College
- Open access: Yes

Standard abbreviations
- ISO 4: ASEBL J.

Indexing
- ISSN: 1944-401X
- LCCN: 2008203772
- OCLC no.: 271424997

Links
- Journal homepage

ASEBL Journal was a peer-reviewed academic journal founded by Tague and published by St. Francis College. It published its first issue in 2007, and ceased regular publication in 2021 with volume 15. However, content is still published on the journal's website on an ad hoc basis.

In early editions, the initialism ASEBL signified the "Association for the Study of Ethical Behavior in Literature"; later, this became "Association for the Study of (Ethical Behavior) • (Evolutionary Biology) in Literature". In a "new departure" when regular publication of the journal stopped, ASEBL now stands for "animal studies ethical behavior literacy".

ASEBL Journal was indexed by EBSCOhost and the Modern Language Association.

=== Bibliotekos ===
With Fredericka A. Jacks, Tague is the general editor of the publishing website and micro publisher Bibliotekos. Bibliotekos has published a series of collections edited by Tague, as well as assorted interviews with and profiles of authors, articles on literary topics, and book reviews.

== Selected publications ==
=== Author ===
- Character and Consciousness: George Eliot, Thomas Hardy, D.H. Lawrence (Phenomenological, Ecological, and Ethical Readings) (Academica Press, 2005)
- Ethos and Behavior: The English Novel from Jane Austen to Henry James (Academica Press, 2008)
- Making Mind: Moral Sense and Consciousness in Philosophy, Science, and Literature (Rodopi, 2014)
- Art and Adaptation: A Primer from Notes (Bibliotekos, 2015)
- Evolution and Human Culture: Texts and Contexts (Brill, 2016)
- Art and Adaptability: Consciousness and Cognitive Culture (Brill, 2018)
- An Ape Ethic and the Question of Personhood (Lexington Books, 2020)
- The Vegan Evolution: Transforming Diets and Agriculture (Routledge, 2022)
- Forest Sovereignty: Wildlife Sustainability and Ethics (Peter Lang, 2025)

=== Editor (scholarly) ===
- Origins of English Literary Modernism, 1870-1914 (Academica, 2009)
- Origins of English Dramatic Modernism, 1870-1914 (Academica 2010, with Daniel Meyer-Dinkgräfe)

=== Editor (literary) ===
- Pain and Memory: Reflections on the Strength of the Human Spirit in Suffering (Bibliotekos, 2009)
- Common Boundary: Stories of Immigration (Bibliotekos, 2010)
- Battle Runes: Writings on War (Bibliotekos, 2011)
- Being Human: Call of the Wild (Bibliotekos, 2012)
- Puzzles of Faith and Patterns of Doubt: Short Stories and Poems (Bibliotekos, 2013)
