= Maimonides Midwood Community Hospital =

Hospital in Brooklyn

Coordinates: 40°36′50″N 73°56′54″W

- Maimonides Health
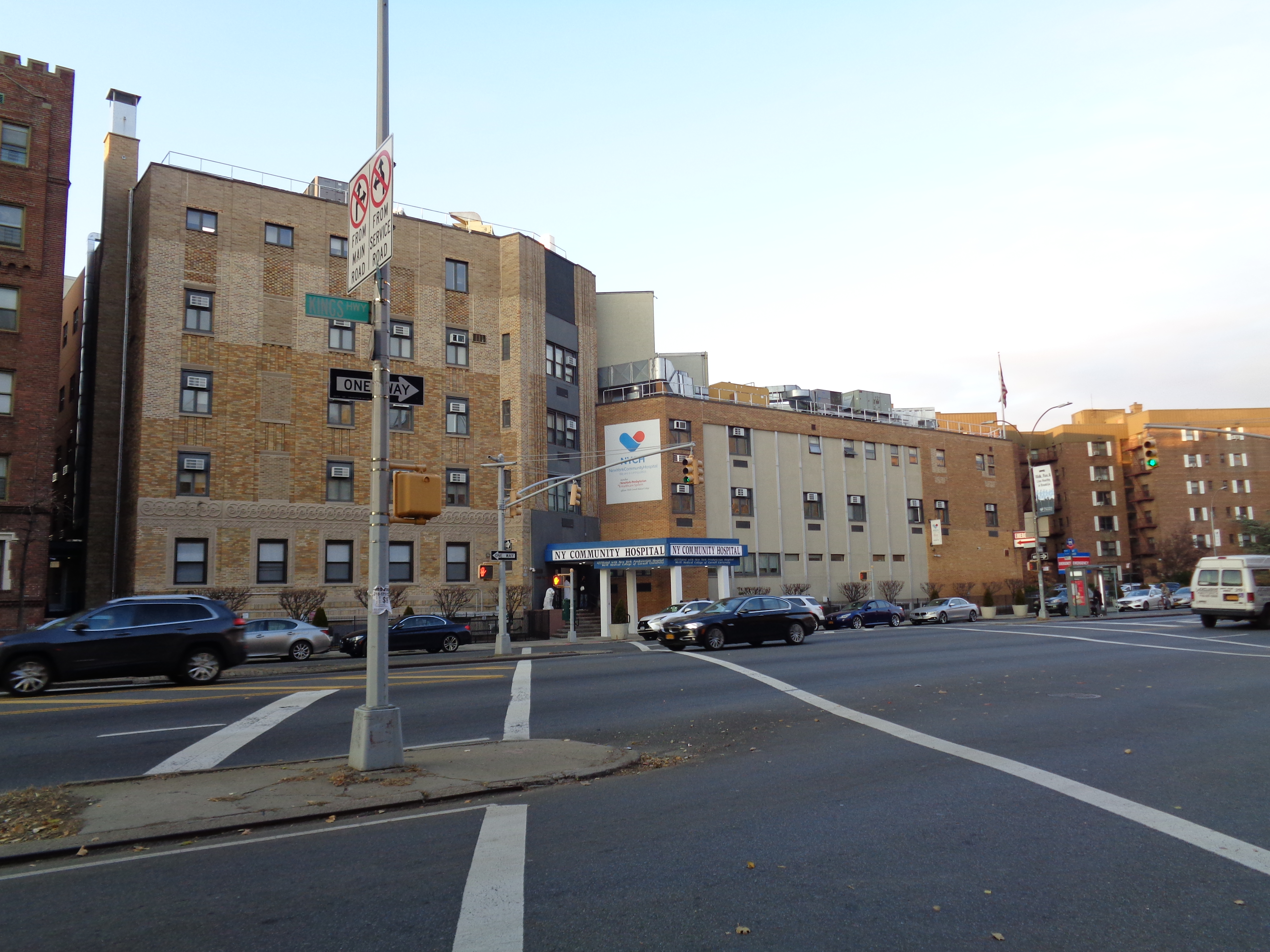
- New York Community Hospital (2017)

Geography
- Location: Brooklyn, New York, United States

Services
- Emergency department: Yes
- Beds: 134

History
- Former name: Madison Park Hospital
- Opened: 1929
- Closed: 1997 (merged)

Links
- Website: www.nych.com
- Lists: Hospitals in New York State
- Other links: List of hospitals in Brooklyn

Maimonides Midwood Community Hospital, formerly New York Community Hospital is a 134 bed community hospital in Brooklyn, NY that was founded in 1929 by two brothers, both doctors. The hospital has been renamed several times before becoming part of New York-Presbyterian Hospital in 1997 and whose affiliation ended in 2016. They more recently partnered with Maimonides Medical Center. The hospital, which was described as "One Address, Many Hospitals" due to changing names, offers Kosher meals to patients.

== History ==
The original medical facility, Madison Park Hospital, was founded in 1929 by Dr. Albert R. Fritz and his brother Dr. J. Dudley Fritz. It was mostly known as a maternity hospital. The hospital was named for the neighborhood. Over a period of time, the name was changed and the hospital underwent more than one affiliation.

- Madison Community Hospital of Adelphi College
- Hospital of the Jacques Loewe Foundation (1961)
- Community Hospital, which filed for bankruptcy in 1973. In 1978 the New York State Hospital Review and Planning Council recommended closing the hospital.
- New York Community Hospital (1992; affiliated with New York Hospital-Cornell Medical Center.
- New York Community Hospital (1997-2016; affiliated with New York-Presbyterian Hospital.
- New York Community Hospital (2018; partnered with Maimonides Medical Center) The link of the 134-bed NYCH with the 711-bed Maimonidies that began as a Clinical Collaboration in 2018 brought speculation in 2020 that "a full-asset merger" has been discussed.
- New York Community Hospital was renamed to Maimonides Midwood Community Hospital on March 25th, 2022 to reflect its affiliation with Maimonides Medical Center

It began as a 60-bed hospital, subsequently expanded to 134 beds. In 2006 a state agency recommended merging this hospital with another; it wasn't done.
