= Shore Road Hospital =

Defunct Brooklyn hospital

Geography
- Location: Brooklyn, New York, United States
- Coordinates: 40.6219°N 74.0397°W

Services
- Beds: 93

History
- Opened: 1924
- Demolished: 1977

Links
- Lists: Hospitals in New York State
- Other links: List of hospitals in Brooklyn

Shore Road Hospital was a 93-bed private hospital in Brooklyn, New York City, which opened in 1924 and was demolished in 1977. "Although it was a full service hospital, it specialized in maternity care."

== History ==
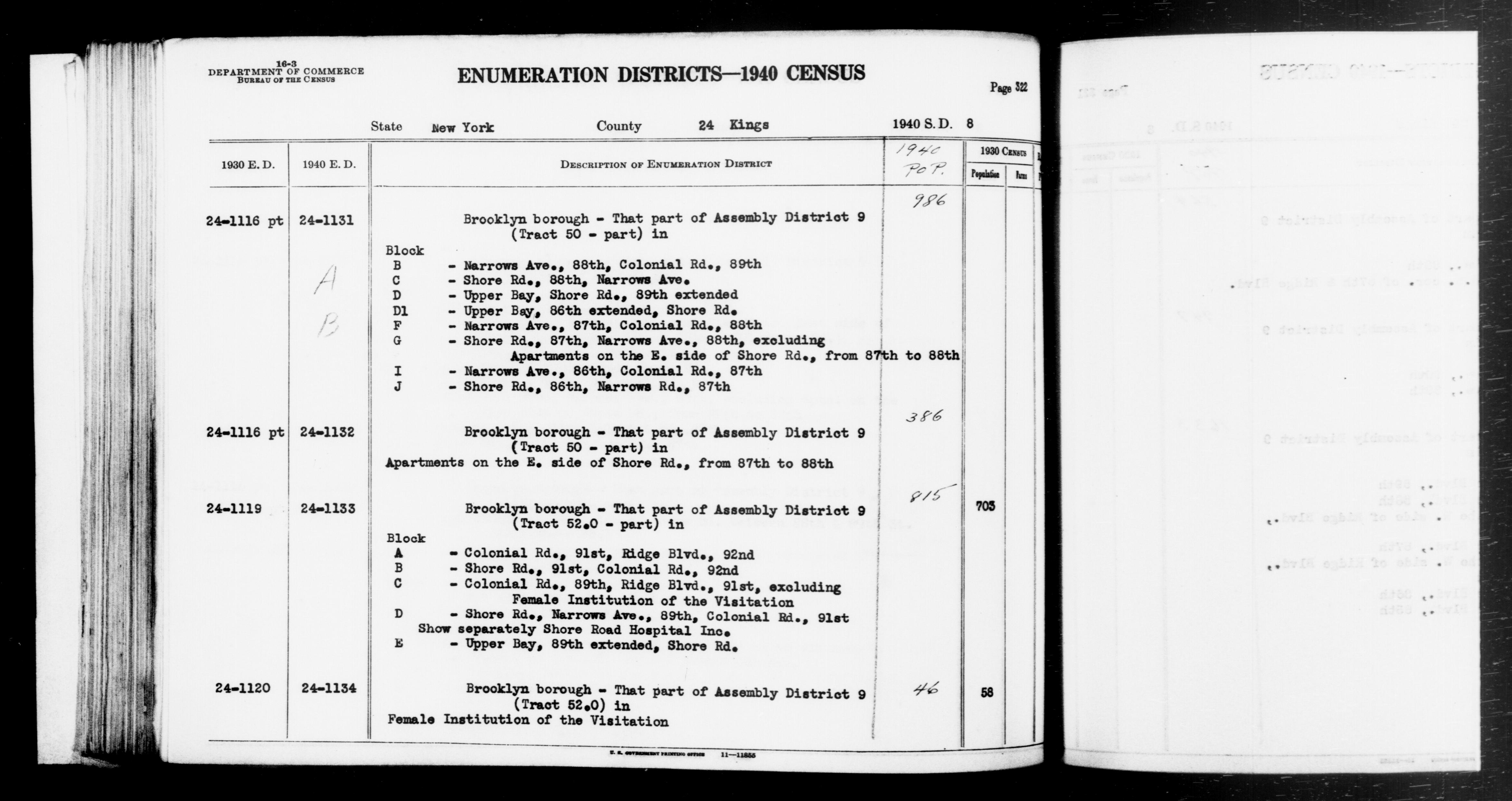
Shore Road Hospital, in a 1940 census document

The hospital attempted to advance state of the art in this and other areas, including:

- use of temporary artificial sunburns in place of tags and footprints; the effect would last for two weeks.
- new forms of anesthesia for women giving birth
- experimental injections to treat varicose veins.

The hospital's building previously was a mansion "built around 1910 to 1911" and later owned by John J. Raskob. Conversion was done by Charles Greenfield, who operated Shore Road Hospital for 43 years. The hospital's grounds were large enough to accommodate constructing housing for nurses and other employees.

The main structure was razed in 1977. Once "the entire hospital complex was torn down" a 558-unit apartment house was built on the three-acre site: Shore Hill Apartments. Plans for a taller building had previously met community resistance.
