= Victory Memorial Hospital =

Defunct Brooklyn hospital

Geography
- Location: Brooklyn, New York, United States
- Coordinates: 40°36′58″N 74°01′22″W

Services
- Beds: 254

History
- Opened: about 1927

Links
- Lists: Hospitals in New York State
- Other links: List of hospitals in Brooklyn

Victory Memorial Hospital was a 254-bed medical facility in Brooklyn. It was announced in 2006 that they were closing; they were acquired by SUNY Downstate Medical Center in 2009 and renamed SUNY Downstate at Bay Ridge.

== History ==
Victory Memorial was a not-for-profit, voluntary hospital. Most of the hospital's "complex of dun-colored buildings at the southeastern edge of Bay Ridge" were built in 1927, but they opened earlier in a single building at their 92nd Street/Seventh Avenue Brooklyn location.

In the 1960s, Victory Memorial built a new wing and added 64 beds, with recognition given for "increasing hospital facilities in Brooklyn."

On June 25, 2021 Maimonides Medical Center broke ground for a new 15,000 square foot, free standing Emergency Department at Victory.

=== Incidents ===
- Two patients were murdered in the hospital by the son of one of them in 1999.
- The driver and a bystander died when "a tank truck delivering liquid oxygen exploded outside" the hospital. A year-long investigation by the National Transportation Safety Board discovered "a complex, explosive chemical reaction, lasting a second or less" described as a "series of events never before observed."
- H.I.V.-Tainted blood given "during emergency ulcer surgery."
- "The hospital's director of radiology" and "the hospital's assistant director of radiology" pleaded guilty to "failure to file a [tax] return for three years." They ran a side business that "supplies radiology technicians to various health-care providers" (including Victory Memorial).

== See also ==
- List of hospitals in Brooklyn
