= Midwood Hospital =

Defunct Brooklyn hospital

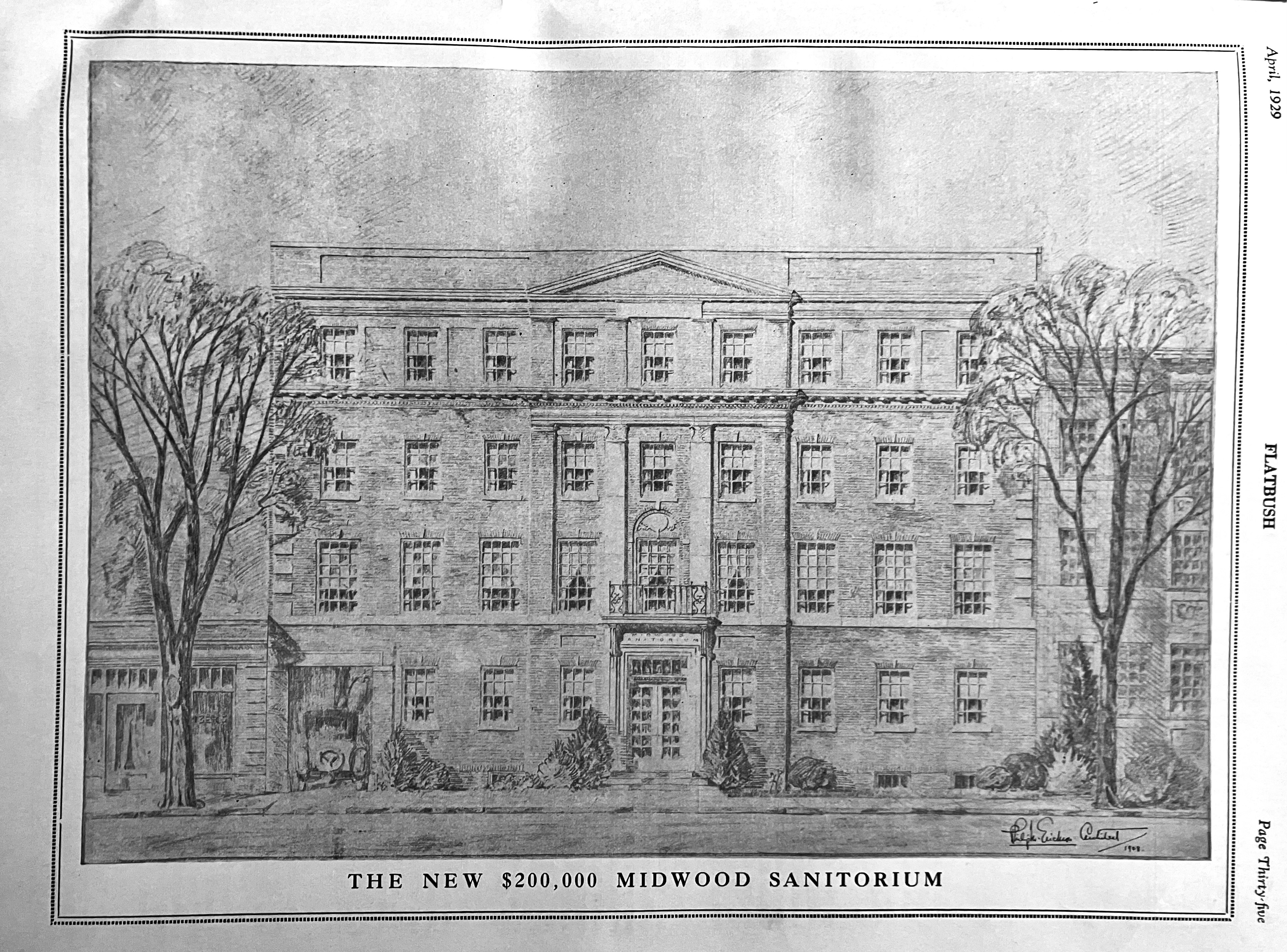
- Midwood Hospital in 1929

Geography
- Location: Brooklyn, New York, United States
- Coordinates: 40°39′25″N 73°57′34″W

Organization
- Care system: Private

History
- Former name: Midwood Sanitarium
- Constructed: 1929 (rebuilt building)
- Opened: 1907
- Closed: 1970s

Links
- Lists: Hospitals in New York State
- Other links: Hospitals in Brooklyn

Midwood Hospital opened in Brooklyn in 1907 as Midwood Sanitarium. It closed in the 1970s, and its building served as a private school from 1979 through 2000.

== History ==
Built at a cost of $200,000 in response to growing Brooklyn demand for top-notch medical facilities and opened just months before the Wall Street Crash of 1929, the new Midwood Sanitarium boasted "the most modern operating room in Greater New York," with "a fully equipped X-ray and pathological laboratory" and round-the-clock physician staffing. Designed by neoclassical New York architect Philip M. Erickson, the hospital employed a special diet kitchen, incinerator chutes, and "colors to harmonise with the special furnishings which have been ordered for each room."

The new, fire-proof building replaced an earlier wooden structure. The new hospital used more of the grounds and could treat more patients. It received repeat business for births, and was noted for "bright and cheery colors" as "a relief from endless white walls."

From 1979 to 2000 it housed St. John's Elementary School, a private school.

The next use for the 19 Winthrop Street building, still continuing as of 2021, is via CAMBA, Inc., a city-funded social services organization.
