= Evangelical Deaconess Hospital =

Brooklyn hospital

Geography
- Location: Bushwick, Brooklyn, New York, United States
- Coordinates: 40.6832°N 73.9096°W

History
- Closed: 1950

Links
- Lists: Hospitals in New York State
- Other links: List of hospitals in Brooklyn

Evangelical Deaconess Hospital's four-story building on Chauncey Street continued to serve the Bushwick, Brooklyn neighborhood even after the hospital closed in the 1960s.

== History ==
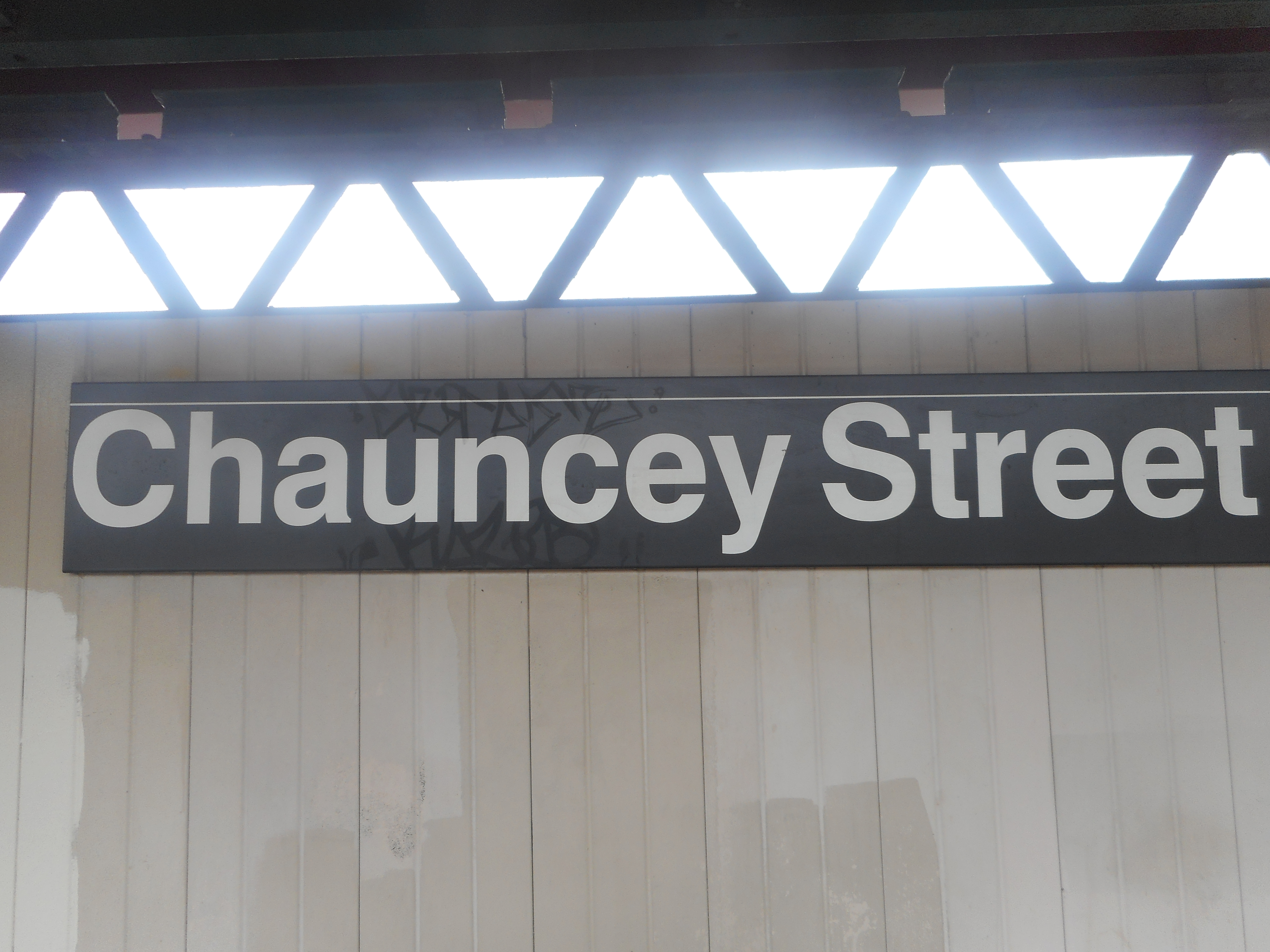
nearby Chauncey Street train station

Twenty years after the hospital was closed, and the community rejected using it as an overflow for a Bronx-based drug rehab program, the structure was adapted into a temporary relocation facility for "welfare families now in hotels as well as families left homeless by fires."

It subsequently became a homeless men's shelter.

== See also ==
- Deaconess Hospital (St. Louis, Missouri)
