= Bensonhurst Maternity Hospital =

Maternity hospital in Brooklyn

Coordinates: 40°36′22.1″N 73°59′20.5″W

Geography
- Location: New York City, New York, United States

History
- Opened: 1920s
- Closed: after 1930

Links
- Lists: Hospitals in New York State
- Other links: List of hospitals in New York City

Bensonhurst Maternity Hospital was built in the mid-1920s "across Bay Parkway from JCH" (Jewish Community House of Bensonhurst).

As of 2016, the building houses a Jewish School.
