= Abraham J. Berry =

Physician, first mayor of Williamsburgh, Brooklyn, NYC

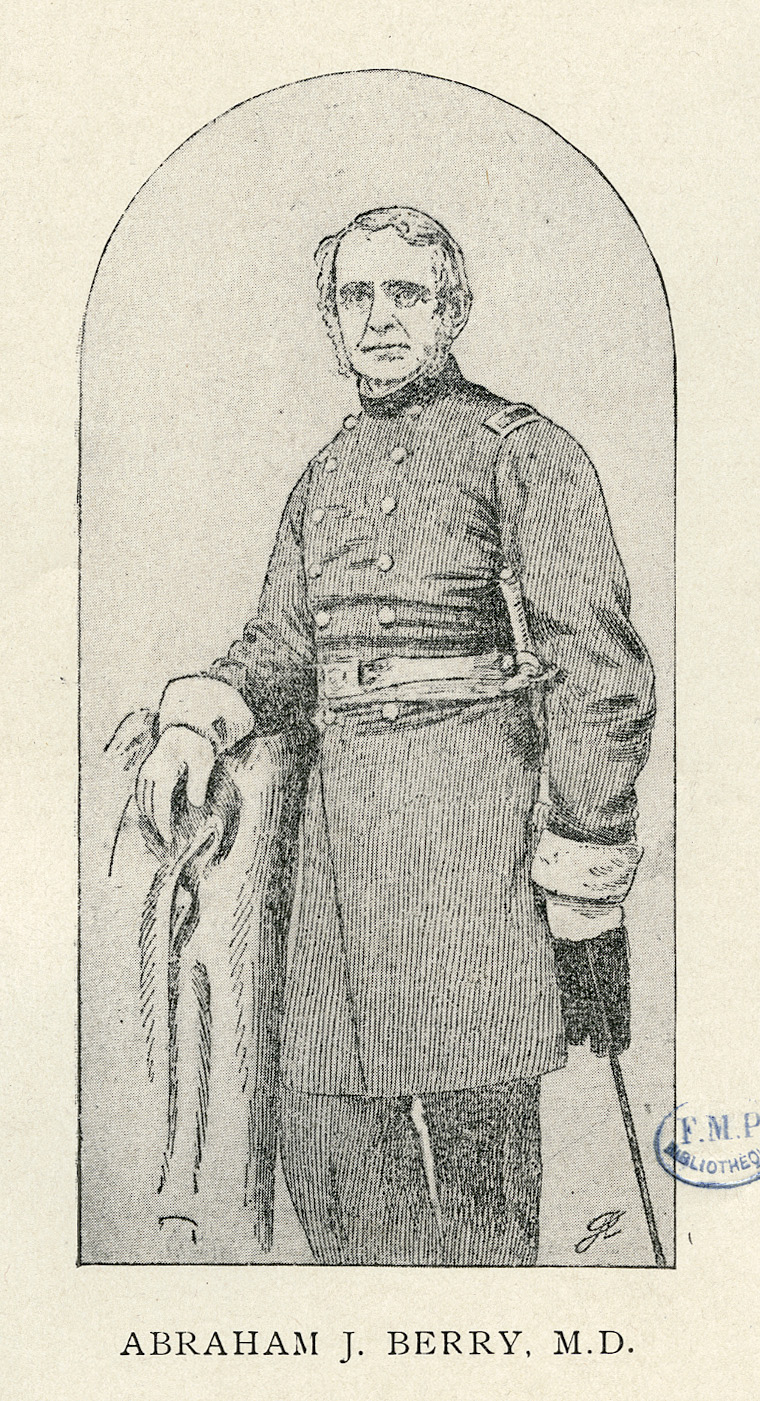
Dr. Abraham J. Berry, M.D.

Abraham J. Berry (c. 1797–1865), a physician, was the first mayor of "the independent city of Williamsburgh."

== Early life ==
Berry "was born in New York City and educated as a physician." "Dr. Berry became one of the most admired and recognized figures in the city" partly due to his 1832 work with cholera patients.

== First mayor of Williamsburgh ==
Among his accomplishments leading up to and becoming the first mayor of Williamsburgh (1852–1853) were:

- a ferry linking to Manhattan
- dropping the h from Williamsburgh
- "his 1855 proposal consolidated Williamsburg with the rest of Brooklyn."

Following his term in office, Berry was unsuccessful in a four-way race for a congressional seat. In 1851, prior to his mayoral term in office, he was an election supervisor, appointing election inspectors. Only one other person served after him as mayor of Williamburgh.

== Civil War ==
"At the beginning of the Civil War, Dr. Berry enlisted as a surgeon in the 38th New York Infantry." He died "the result of a fever he contracted during that time."

== Family ==
He had a wife, a daughter named Julia (d. 1906), and a son John (c. 1835–1915).

== Legacy ==
The name Berry in Williamsburg's Berry Playground at 106 South Third Street, between Bedford Avenue and Berry Street, refers to:

- nearby Berry Street
- the street was named for his family
- that he was a physician, and the park's address is linked to a since-closed hospital.
