= Emanuel Unity Hospital =

Defunct Brooklyn hospital

Emanuel Unity Hospital was a hospital in Brooklyn; it is now defunct. It originated as Emanuel Hospital and Unity Hospital. By the 1970s it was referred to locally as Unity Hospital.

== History ==
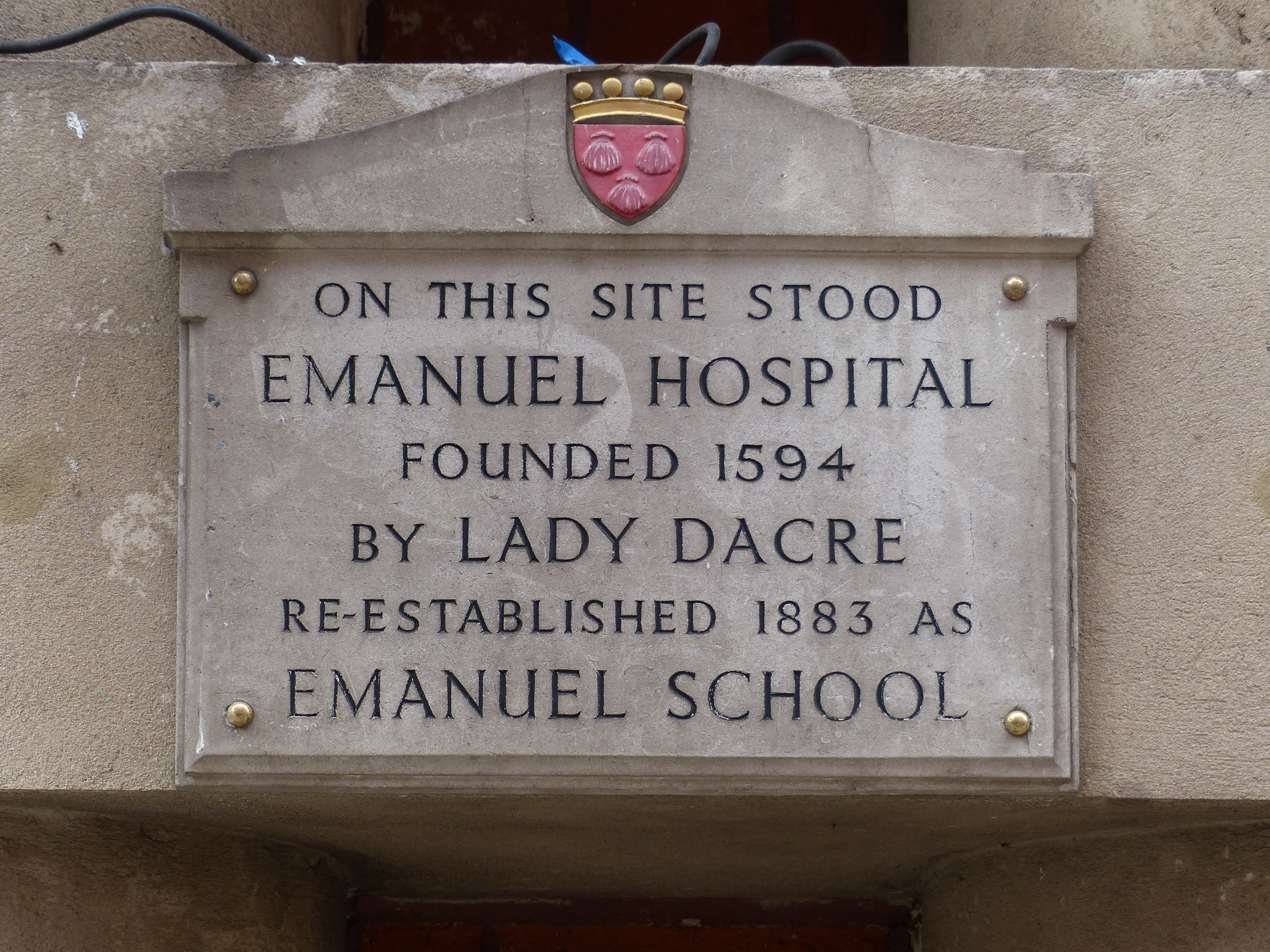
Emanuel Hospital plaque

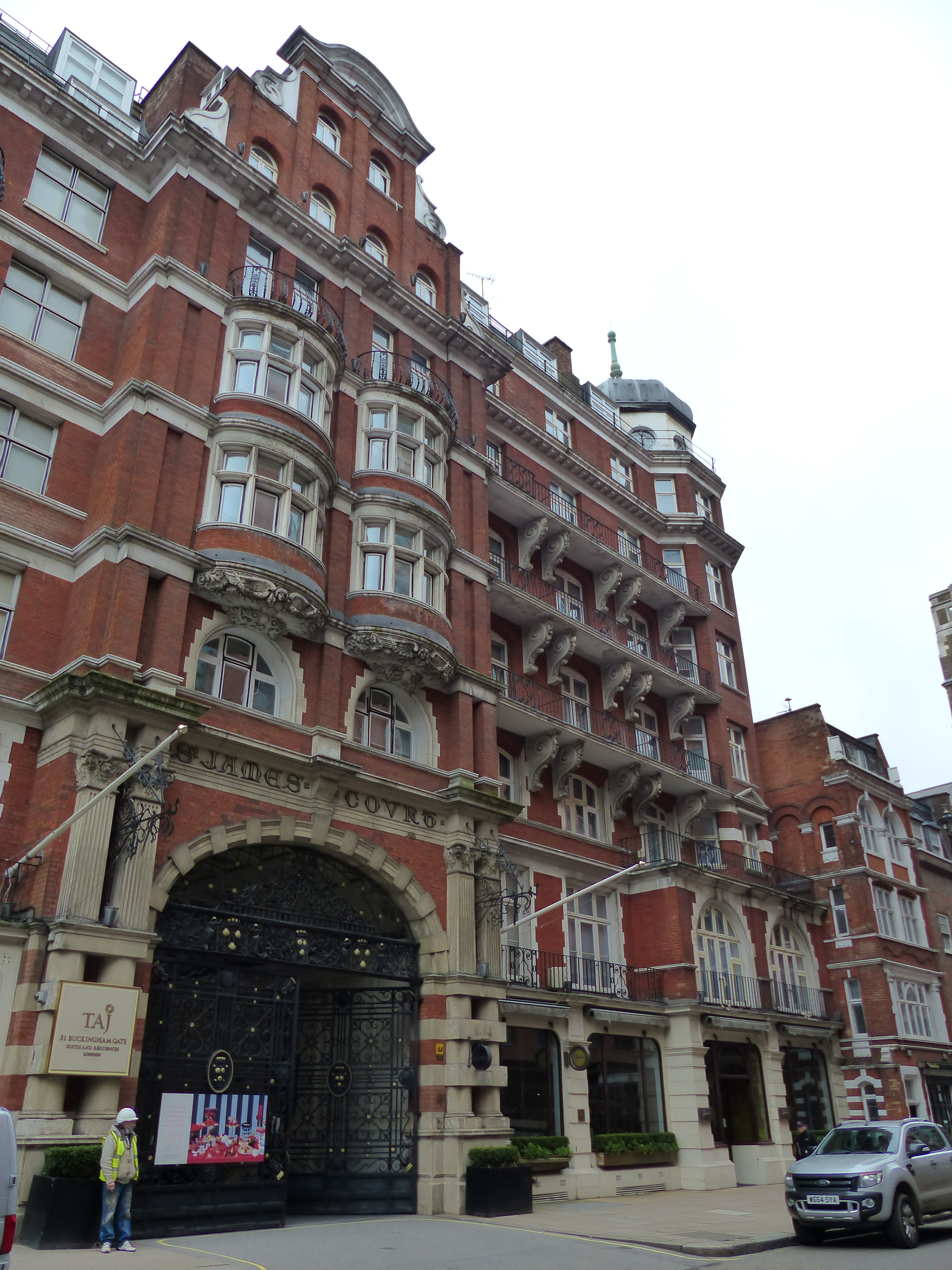
Emanuel Hospital plaque site

The same local hospital that attempted to swallow up Emanuel Hospital in 1899 was, in 1978, battling them for its own survival. The latter situation resulted in a compromise: for then, Unity would "keep its methadone maintenance drug program and its outpatient services open, both of which will be run by Jewish Hospital." By 1989 Jewish also lost a battle for survival.

Unity Hospital's 1545 St. Johns Place building, once the hospital closed, became an apartment building.

== See also ==
- List of hospitals in Brooklyn
