= Williamsburg General Hospital =

Brooklyn hospital

Geography
- Location: Brooklyn, New York, United States

History
- Opened: 1849
- Closed: before 1970

Links
- Lists: Hospitals in New York State
- Other links: List of hospitals in Brooklyn

Williamsburg General Hospital was the final name of a Brooklyn hospital that opened in the late 19th century and both moved and changed names more than once. One of these names is associated with "Brooklyn's first woman ambulance surgeon," Mary Crawford. Today that location houses an apartment building and an earlier one became a playground.

== History ==
The hospital had several names and was associated with no fewer than five locations.

Three names used by the hospital were:

- Brooklyn Throat Hospital
- Williamsburgh Hospital (Williamsburg Hospital once Williamsburg's "h" was dropped)
- Williamsburg General Hospital.

Five locations associated with the hospital were:

- "South 3d St. and Bedford Avenue" (at times written as Bedford Avenue and South 3rd Street)
- 106 South Third Street
- 342 Bedford Avenue
- 156 South 9th Street and
- 757 Bushwick Avenue.

They began as Brooklyn Throat Hospital in 1859 and were listed in the 1897 Annual Report of the New York State Board of Welfare as Dispensary of the Brooklyn Throat Hospital. They were renamed Williamsburgh Hospital and subsequently Williamsburg General Hospital.

The 757 Bushwick Avenue structure that housed the hospital's last location was torn down and, in 1970, rebuilt as an apartment building. In 1936 the 106 South Third Street structure was purchased by the city government, torn down, and became Berry Playground.

== See also ==
- List of hospitals in Brooklyn
