= Brooklyn Hospital Center =

- Mount Sinai Health System
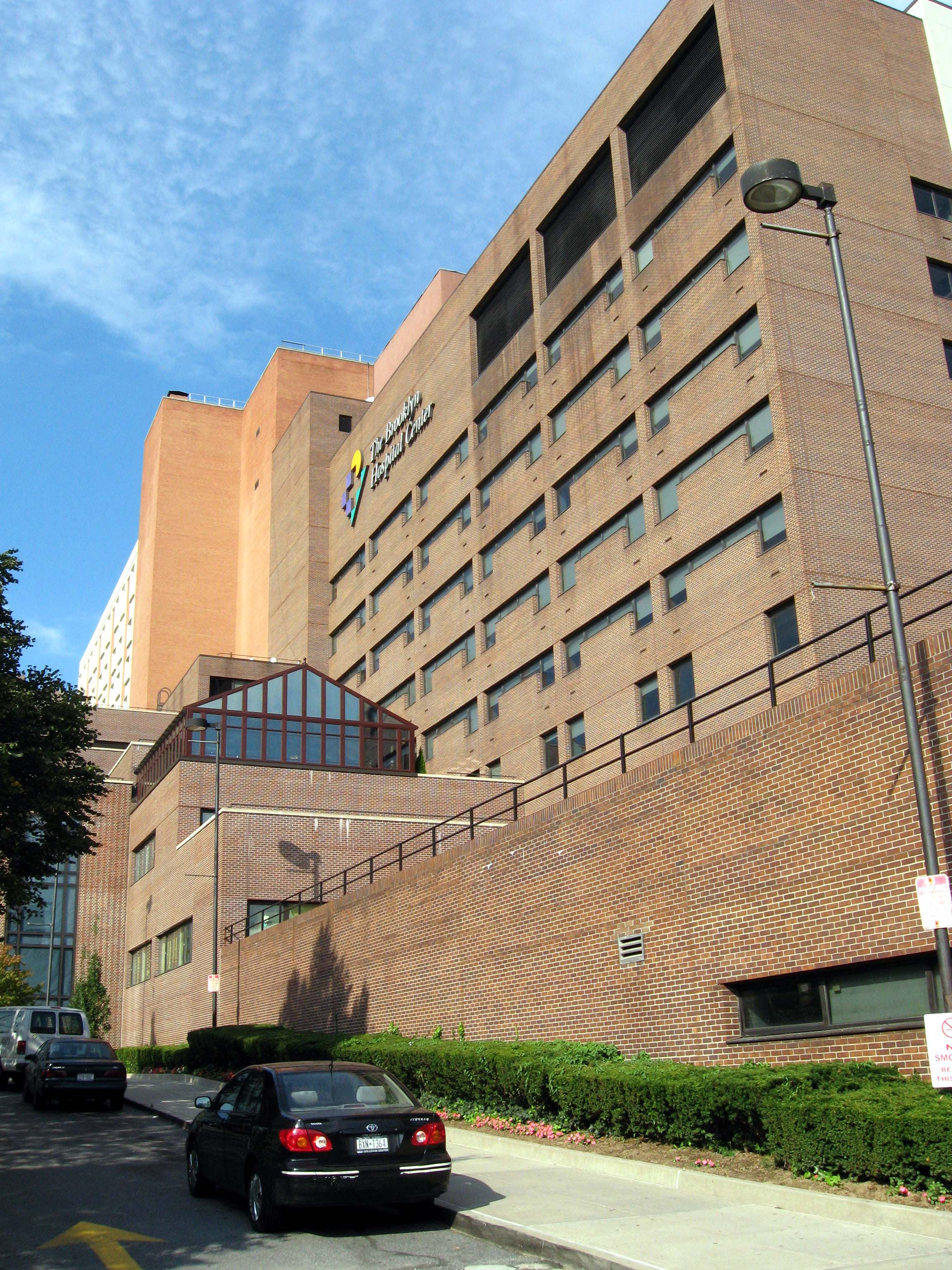

- Location within New York City

Geography
- Location: 121 DeKalb Avenue, Brooklyn, New York City, New York, United States
- Coordinates: 40°41′24″N 73°58′38″W

Organization
- Affiliated university: Mount Sinai Health System

Services
- Emergency department: Yes
- Beds: 464

History
- Founded: 1845

Links
- Website: Official website
- Lists: Hospitals in New York State
- Other links: Hospitals in Brooklyn

The Brooklyn Hospital Center is a 464-licensed-bed, full-service community teaching hospital located in Downtown Brooklyn, New York City. The hospital was founded in 1845. It is affiliated with the Mount Sinai Health System, and serves a diverse population from a wide range of ethnic backgrounds.

== History ==
=== 1845-1945 ===
The hospital was founded in May 1845 as "Brooklyn City Hospital", following a public meeting convened by Mayor Smith of what was then Brooklyn City. Public fund collection meetings were arranged to financially sustain the hospital. Patient admission started in 1847. The hospital developed and grew, and by the start of the twentieth century it had several buildings for providing services to the burgeoning population. In 1883, the name was changed from Brooklyn City Hospital to The Brooklyn Hospital.

In 1925, William H. Field and Edwin P. Maynard, Jr., at that time two residents in the hospital, introduced a unit history system for keeping permanent, easy-to-retrieve patient records.

=== 1945-present ===
Extensive modernization of the hospital took place after World War II. Several mergers occurred, adding to the ever-increasing size of the facility. The Raymond Street Jail was on the site of the northern third of the Brooklyn Hospital Center.

In 1982 they merged with Caledonian Hospital, becoming Brooklyn Caledonian Hospital (and retaining both locations until the Caledonian location was closed in 2003). In 1990, the name was changed to The Brooklyn Hospital Center (TBHC). In 1998, the hospital became a corporate member of the NewYork-Presbyterian Healthcare System. In 2014 it left the NewYork-Presbyterian Healthcare System and affiliated with the Mount Sinai Health System.

The hospital continued to expand primary and outpatient services as well as acute care services, and in 2013 The Brooklyn Hospital Center became an active participant in NYSDOH's Prevention Agenda 2013–2017. Health priorities of the initiative include the Prevention of Chronic Diseases such as Heart Disease, Cancer, Respiratory Disease, Diabetes, and the Reduction of Childhood Obesity. In 2008 The Brooklyn Hospital Center received $27,509,848 from GME medicare payments.

== Awards and recognition ==
In 2011, 2012, and 2013 The Brooklyn Hospital Center received the American Heart Association: Gold Plus Achievement Award for Stroke Care.

In 2012, The Brooklyn Hospital Center's Williamsburg Family Health Center was recognized by the NCQA and American Diabetes Association (ADA) in Diabetes Physician Recognition Program for providing quality care to patients with diabetes.

In 2013, the National Council of Quality Association (NCQA) recognized The Brooklyn Hospital Center for providing excellent diabetic care with good outcomes. The NCQA's Diabetes Physician Recognition Program (DPRP) was awarded to TBHC's Family Medicine Center and six family medicine physicians.

In 2014, The Brooklyn Hospital Center was recognized as a Top Performer on Key Quality Measures in 2012 by the Joint Commission on hospital safety for heart attack, heart failure, pneumonia and surgical care.

== Clinical services and outpatient sites ==
The Brooklyn Hospital Center Inpatient and Specialized Services:
Dental Care & Oral/Maxillofacial Surgery
Emergency Medicine
Family Medicine
Internal Medicine: Allergy, Cancer Care, Cardiology, Dermatology, Dialysis Services, Endocrinology, Gastroenterology, Geriatrics, Infectious Diseases, Nephrology, Neurology, Pulmonary Medicine, Rheumatology
OB/GYN: Gynecologic Oncology, Reproductive Genetics, Labor and Delivery
Pediatrics: Pediatric Hematology/Oncology, Pediatric Genetics, Neonatal and Pediatric Intensive Care

Psychiatry
Radiology: Diagnostic Radiology, Radiation Oncology, Interventional Radiology, Nuclear Medicine
Surgery: Cardiothoracic, Minimally Invasive, Neurosurgery, Ophthalmology, Orthopaedic, Podiatry, Urology, Vascular, Weight Loss

Specialized Services: Colonoscopy/Endoscopy, Detox Unit, Geriatric Unit, Head and Neck, Rehabilitation Services, Respiratory Therapy, Smoking Cessation, Speech & Hearing, Stroke Center, Otolaryngology, Palliative Care, Pastoral Care, Program for AIDS Treatment and Health, Travel Medicine, and Wound Care.
The Brooklyn Hospital Center Community-Based Facilities: All sites are NCQA-designated Patient Centered Medical Homes and provide primary, preventive and specialty care services including pediatrics and ob-gyn.
- 61st Street Family Health Center – Sunset Park (languages spoken: English, Mandarin, Cantonese)
- La Providencia Family Health Center – Bushwick (languages spoken: English, Spanish)
- Manhattan Avenue Family Health Center – Greenpoint (languages spoken: English, Polish)
- Williamsburg Family Health Center (languages spoken: English, Spanish, Yiddish)
On-campus Outpatient Services:
Women's Health Center, Children's Health Center, Program for AIDS Treatment and Health (PATH), Dentistry & Oral Surgery, Dialysis treatment, Radiology, Pediatric and Adult Oncology

== Affiliations and partnerships ==
Affiliations
The Brooklyn Hospital Center was formerly affiliated with the NewYork-Presbyterian Healthcare System through the hospital's affiliation with Cornell University's Weill Cornell Medical College. In September 2014 The Brooklyn Hospital Center ended its affiliation with the NewYork-Presbyterian Healthcare System in favor of affiliating with the Mount Sinai Health System.

The Brooklyn Hospital Center is a designated Clinical Center for St. George's University medical students. The center is approved for residency training by the Accreditation Council for Graduate Medical Education (ACGME) and the American Dental Association (ADA).

Medical Education
The Brooklyn Hospital Center has residencies in Internal Medicine, OB/GYN, Pediatrics, Family Medicine, Emergency Medicine, Dentistry, Pharmacy, Podiatry, Oral Maxillofacial Surgery, & General Surgery. It also sponsors fellowships in Gastroenterology, Hematology/Oncology, and Pulmonary Medicine. The hospital jointly sponsors a Cardiology fellowship with The Mount Sinai Hospital. There are approximately 250 residents and fellows in the program.

Partnerships
The hospital has a number of partnerships with Community Based Organization (CBOs), private Brooklyn practices, nursing homes and Federally Qualified Health Centers. The Community Advisory Board (CAB) helps assess and identify local health needs and offers guidance regarding the scope and quality of care that is offered to the community.
Community Health Planning Workgroup (CHPW), formed by The Brooklyn Hospital Center in 2012, is a group of 15 community-based Brooklyn organizations.

== See also ==
- Brooklyn Home for Consumptives

== Location ==
The Brooklyn Hospital Center is located at 121 DeKalb Avenue in Brooklyn, three blocks east of Flatbush Avenue Extension. The hospital borders the west side of Fort Greene Park and is near the intersection of Ashland Place and DeKalb Avenue. The hospital's service areas include Fort Greene, Downtown Brooklyn, Brooklyn Heights, Vinegar Hill, and Fulton Ferry.
