= Linden General Hospital =

Defunct hospital in Brooklyn

Coordinates: 40°39′49″N 73°53′22″W

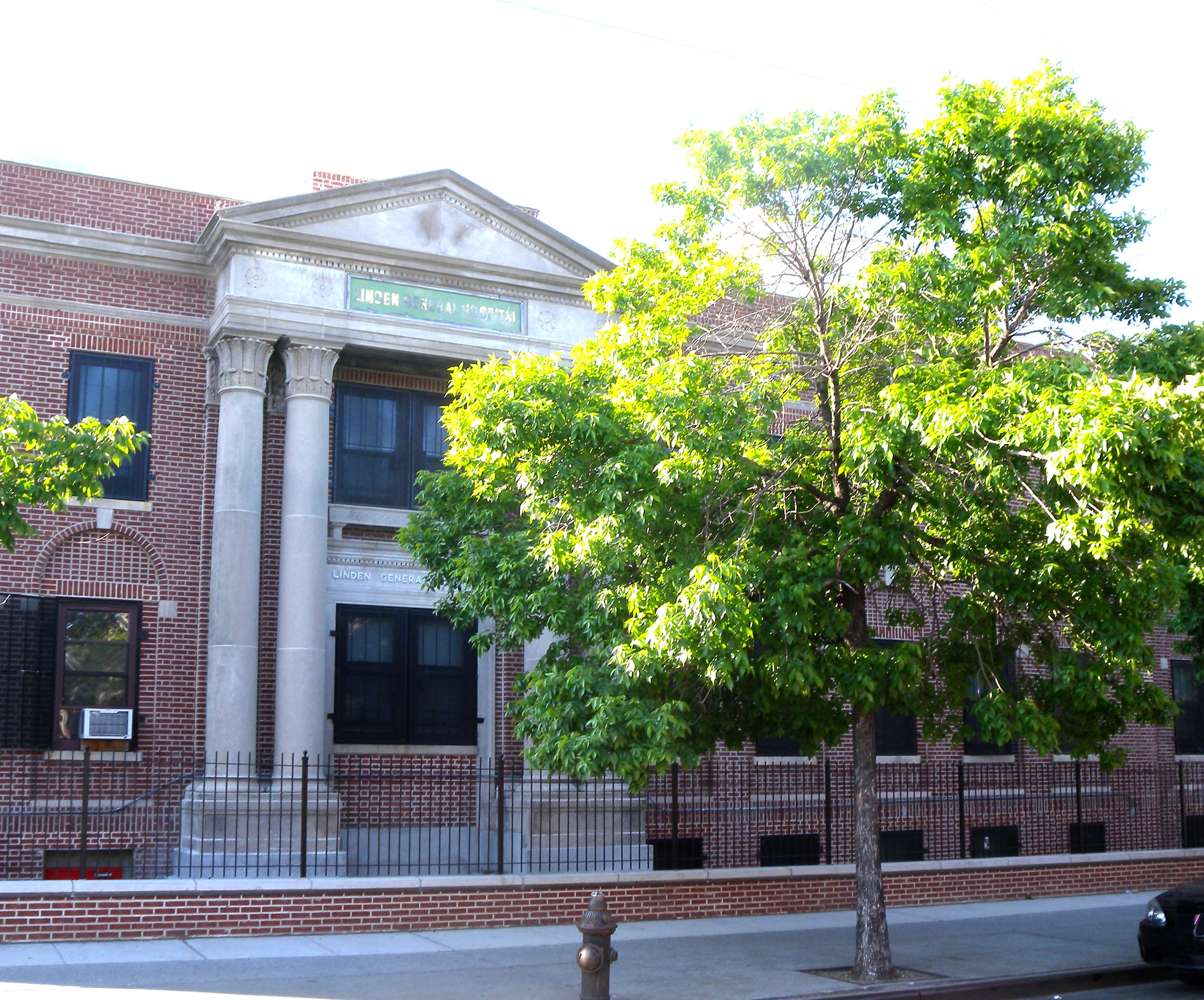

Geography
- Location: Brooklyn, New York, United States

Services
- Beds: 78

History
- Constructed: 1920
- Opened: 1933
- Closed: 1975

Links
- Lists: Hospitals in New York State
- Other links: List of hospitals in Brooklyn

Linden General Hospital was "a 78-bed private health facility in a rundown part of Brooklyn's East New York section." It was a "two-story brick" building located at 501 New Lots Avenue.

== History ==
The building previously housed Riverdale Hospital.

Linden General Hospital was founded as a privately owned hospital in 1933, and sold twice, once to a dentist, the second time to two doctors. Fees for service to patients from Medicaid and Medicare comprised "most of" their income. Due to various lackings, the hospital lost accreditation and subsequently funding. It subsequently closed, and the 1920-built building became a homeless shelter.

=== Loss of funding ===
For "life-threatening fire and health violations", Linden General lost certification and funding but this situation, due to insufficient coordination among Federal, state and city oversight authorities, did not lead to an immediate closure. One factor was that the state "did not have legal jurisdiction over proprietary hospitals in the city" were initially observed. Following "lengthy legal battles in which the state was hampered by lack of staff" the hospital closed.
