= Raymond Street Jail =

Former jail in Brooklyn, New York

Coordinates: 40.691°N 73.979°W

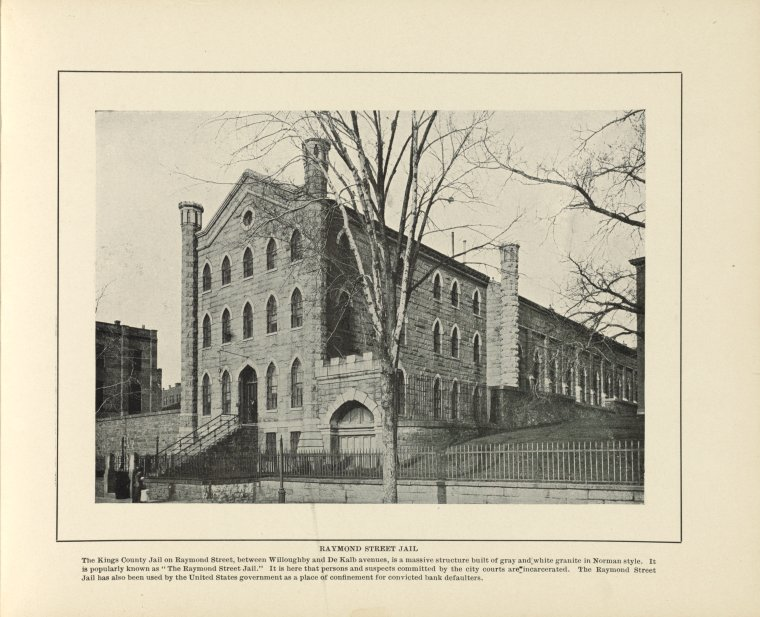
Raymond Street Jail

The Raymond Street Jail was a jail in Brooklyn, New York City. With its cornerstone laid in a ceremony on August 27, 1836, Raymond Street Jail existed as the main prison for the Brooklyn area until Brooklyn was incorporated into New York City in 1898. The facility was closed on July 20, 1963.

When initially constructed, an oversight in planning resulted in there being no front door, with one having to be cut into the walls as a result. Originally for male prisoners, a female wing was added in 1839. It underwent several phases of construction, and was rebuilt in 1879 and 1909.

== Location ==
Raymond Street later became Ashland Place, Brooklyn. The Raymond Street Jail was in the block between Willoughby Street and DeKalb Avenue. The site of the jail is now the northern third of the Brooklyn Hospital Center.
