= Williamsburg Maternity Hospital =

Brooklyn hospital

Geography
- Location: 753 Bushwick Avenue, Brooklyn, New York, United States
- Coordinates: 40°41′45″N 73°55′46.55″W

Organization
- Care system: Private
- Type: Specialist

Services
- Speciality: Maternity

History
- Opened: 1918
- Closed: 1950s

Links
- Lists: Hospitals in New York State
- Other links: Hospitals in Brooklyn

Williamsburg Maternity Hospital was a Brooklyn hospital that had its birth announcements regularly covered. It was located at 753 Bushwick Avenue, and began in 1918. It closed more than once (and reopened) in the late 1920s/early 1930s. Williamsburg Maternity Hospital was listed in the 1930 census and was still operating in the 1950s.
