= Charles Greenfield =

US engineer, hospital administrator

- Born: 1884 or 1885
- Died: April 12, 1979 (aged 94); New York, New York

Charles Greenfield (1884 or 1885 – 1979) was an American engineer and hospital administrator. Trained as an engineer in New York City, Greenfield later became the first administrator of the Shore Road Hospital. Earlier he "helped design and build the Coney Island boardwalk."

== Career ==
Greenfield was a civil engineer with degrees from Cooper Union (1908) and Brooklyn Polytechnic Institute (1912). Although he used this knowledge in the design and building of the Coney Island Boardwalk and "the first road between Little Neck and Great Neck, L.I." he is best known for converting a mansion in Brooklyn into Shore Road Hospital and then directing it for 43 years.

Prior to dying at age 94, he was the only living alumnus of his "Cooper" and "Poly" graduating classes.

== Family ==
When he died at age 94 on April 12, 1979, his living family members included his wife, two daughters, "three grandchildren, and two great-grandchildren.
