= Flatbush General Hospital =

Brooklyn hospital

Geography
- Location: Brooklyn, New York, United States
- Coordinates: 40°39′14″N 73°55′55″W

Links
- Lists: Hospitals in New York State
- Other links: List of hospitals in Brooklyn

Flatbush General Hospital was a private "operated for profit" hospital

When the 719 Linden Boulevard (corner East 49th Street) facility closed, their medical records were transferred to Mount Sinai Brooklyn, a nearby hospital.
