= Elizabeth Fedde =

Norwegian Lutheran Deaconess (1850–1921)

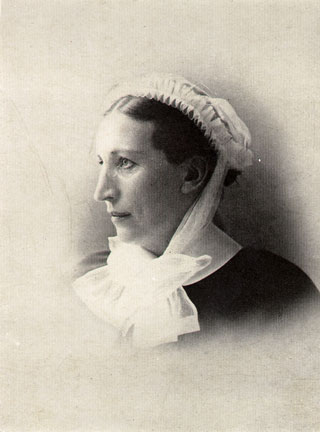
Fedde circa 1880

Elisabeth Fedde (December 25, 1850 – February 25, 1921) was a Norwegian Lutheran Deaconess who established the Norwegian Relief Society to better serve the Norwegian-American immigrant community.

== Biography ==
Elisabeth Fedde was born in Feda in Vest-Agder, Norway on Christmas Day, December 25, 1850, to Captain Andreas Willumsen Fedde (1814-1873) and Anne Marie Olsdatter (1818-1864). Her father was a sea captain who retired when his wife became ill, and he became a farmer. She had six siblings. After her father died in 1873, Elisabeth trained as a deaconess at the Lovisenberg Deaconess House (Diakonissehuset Christiania) in Christiania under the supervision of Cathinka Guldberg, who had herself been trained at the Kaiserswerther Diakonie school and hospital founded by Theodore Fliedner in Kaiserswerth, Germany.

Fedde spent much of her early ministerial career Norway's newest and northernmost diocese. She and another young deaconess established a medical house in Tromsø, the largest city in Troms county, in 1878, where they lived and worked under harsh and primitive conditions. On Christmas Day, 1882 (also her thirty-second birthday), Sister Elisabeth received a letter from her brother-in-law Gabriel Fedde, challenging her to set up a ministry in New York City for Norwegian seamen there. She sailed for the United States three months later and arrived on April 9, 1883.

Nine days later, Sister Elisabeth helped found the Norwegian Relief Society, thus establishing her American ministry. Pastor Andreas Mortensen, whom Gabriel Fedde had served as secretary (after marrying the sister of the Swedish/Norwegian consul in New York), presided over the service establishing the society. Sister Elizabeth established a boarding house at 109 Williams Street, near the Seaman's Church (where Rev. Mortensen served), and rented out three small rooms at $9 per month. Sister Elisabeth also often visited the sick and distressed poor; her diary about those experiences was later published.

In 1885, Fedde opened a deaconess house to train other women, as well as a nine-bed hospital that expanded to 30 beds and ultimately became Lutheran Medical Center of Brooklyn. After several years in New York (during which she corresponded with William Passavant who urged her to take charge of his new hospital in Pittsburgh, Pennsylvania), Fedde accepted the invitation of midwestern Lutherans and moved to Minnesota. Shortly after she arrived in Minneapolis in 1888, Fedde established the Lutheran Deaconess Home. The next year she helped found the Hospital of the Lutheran Free Church. Fedde also helped Mortensen plan for a third hospital in Chicago (which opened in 1897), and another in Grand Forks, North Dakota.

Eventually, exhausted by her thirteen years working in America, Sister Elisabeth returned to Norway in November 1895. Shortly after her return, she married the patient Ole Slettebo, a suitor whom she had left to conduct her missionary work. After nearly a decade on his farm near the southern port city of Egersund, Rogaland, Fedde sailed back to Brooklyn in 1904 to celebrate an anniversary.

Sister Elisabeth Fedde died on February 25, 1921, in Egersund, Rogaland, Norway. Her husband Ole died three years later.

== Legacy ==
The Calendar of Saints of both the Evangelical Lutheran Church in America and the Evangelical Lutheran Church in Canada remembers Elizabeth Fedde on the anniversary of her death.
