= Caledonian Hospital =

Defunct Brooklyn hospital

Geography
- Location: Brooklyn, New York, United States
- Coordinates: 40.6531°N 73.9638°W

Services
- Beds: 444

History
- Opened: 1910
- Closed: 2003

Links
- Lists: Hospitals in New York State
- Other links: List of hospitals in Brooklyn

Caledonian Hospital opened in 1910, merged with the 1840s-founded Brooklyn Hospital in 1982 and closed in 2003. Pre-merger, Brooklyn had 444 beds and Caledonian 209.

Caledonian's seven-story structure subsequently became a "luxury rental with 120 units."

== History ==
The hospital's founder's son, Donald G. C. Sinclair (c. 1905–1976), was the president and subsequently chairman of the board.

By 1987, Brooklyn Caledonian's Caledonian Campus had a new wing, effectively doubling that location's size. Funding was via loans that were backed by the Federal Housing Authority.
