= Maimonides Medical Center =

Coordinates: 40°38′22″N 73°59′55″W

- Maimonides Health
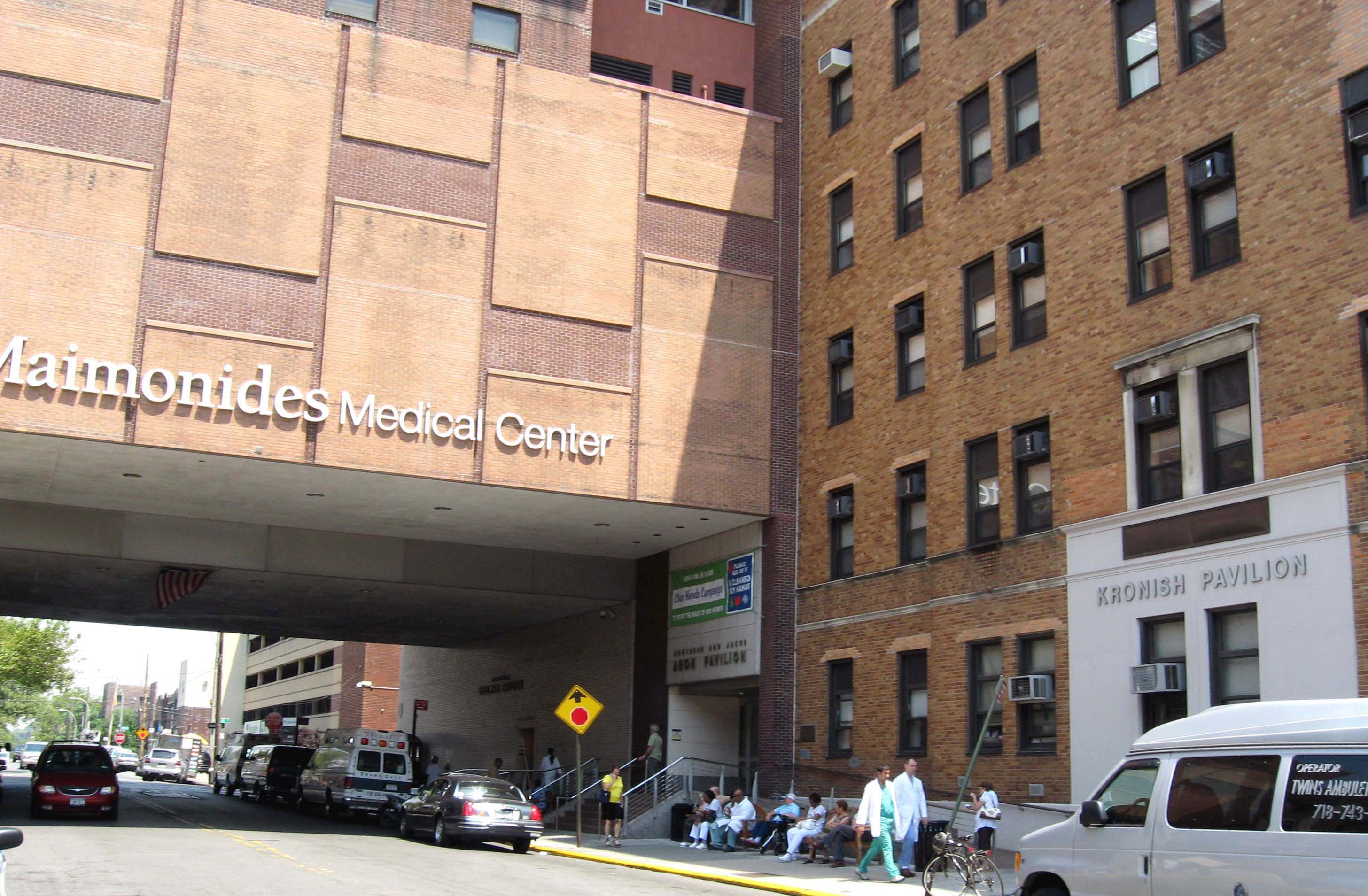
- 10th Avenue

Geography
- Location: 4802 10th Avenue, Brooklyn, New York, United States

Organization
- Care system: Private
- Type: Teaching
- Affiliated university: Albert Einstein College of Medicine; SUNY Downstate Medical Center College of Medicine; Icahn School of Medicine at Mount Sinai; St. George's University

Services
- Emergency department: Level I Adult Trauma Center / Level II Pediatric Trauma Center
- Beds: 711

History
- Founded: 1911

Links
- Website: maimo.org
- Lists: Hospitals in New York State
- Other links: Hospitals in Brooklyn

Maimonides Medical Center is a non-profit, non-sectarian hospital located in Borough Park, in the New York City borough of Brooklyn, in the U.S. state of New York. Maimonides is both a treatment facility and academic medical center with 711 beds, and more than 70 primary care and sub-specialty programs. As of August 1, 2016, Maimonides Medical Center was an adult and pediatric trauma center, and Brooklyn's only pediatric trauma center.

== History ==
=== Early years ===
The institution was founded in 1911 as the New Utrecht Dispensary. It began operation on Sunday, June 11, 1911, at 1275 Thirty-seventh Street, and opened to the public the following day, when it treated ten patients. From the start, it included a dental clinic. In its first six months, it treated over 2,000 patients.

The dispensary's leadership raised funds in 1913 for what was then a separate institution, Zion Hospital of Bath Beach. However, by March 1914, the New Utrecht Dispensary had purchased a property on 36th Street for developing its own hospital and started construction plans. The dispensary received a hospital charter in 1916.

Meanwhile, Zion Hospital proceeded apace, and was organized and incorporated by 1915. Their building was at 2140 Cropsey Avenue, near other major Jewish community organizations of Bath Beach, including the YMHA, YWHA, and the Free Loan Association.

In 1918, the dispensary, still at its original location, began merger talks with Zion Hospital. In 1919, those plans were temporarily halted due to Zion's debt.

Several small dispensaries merged with Utrecht in 1919. The organization changed its name to Israel Hospital of Brooklyn on April 23, 1919. The organization operated at 1246 Forty-second Street at that time. In early 1920, the new hospital building was under construction, at a new location, Tenth Avenue and Forty-eighth Street; that building is still part of the Maimonides campus, though partially obscured by new construction, serving as the hospital administration building. By midyear, the previously abandoned merger was completed, and the combined hospital was called United Israel and Zion. The merger was legally completed on May 19, 1920, with a shortened nickname, not a legal name, of Israel-Zion Hospital.

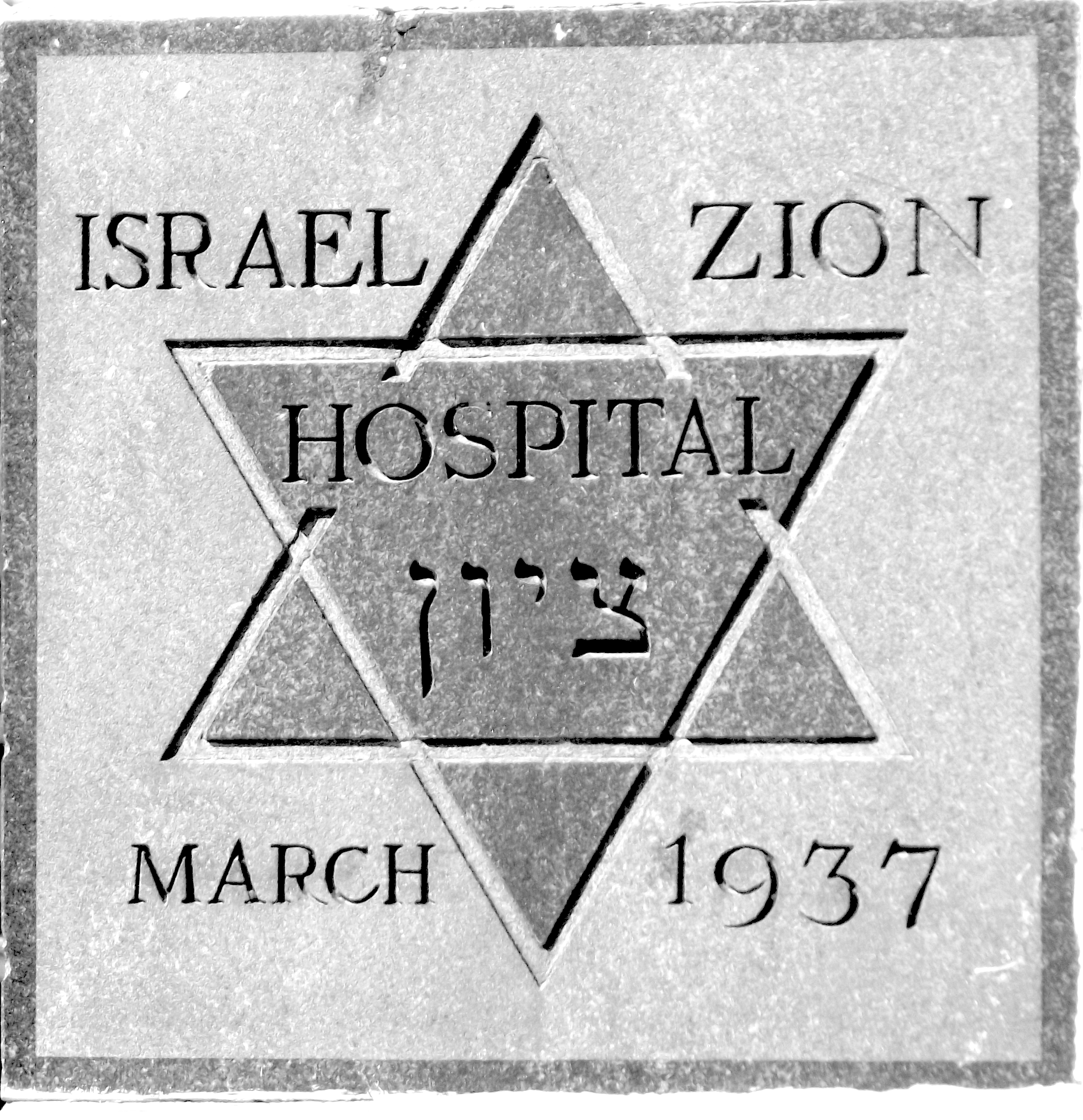
Cornerstone (still in place) at Israel Zion Hospital building

Maimonides Medical Center was formed as a result of the merger of United Israel Zion Hospital and Beth Moses Hospital in 1947. The institution was named after Rabbi Moshe ben Maimon, a 12th-century Jewish philosopher and doctor.

=== Expansion ===
The Maimonides Medical Center expanded its emergency department in 1997 with the opening of the Harry and Jeanette Weinberg Emergency Center. In September 2007, construction started on space in a new building at the corner of 48th Street and Fort Hamilton Parkway. There are two wings, the main differences being in the severity of patients seen. In 2015 Maimonides broke ground on 3.4 million square feet of medical office space to allow patients to visit an array of health care providers in the same building.

=== Affiliation ===
In February 2013, Maimonides Medical Center, the Albert Einstein College of Medicine of Yeshiva University, and Montefiore Medical Center signed an affiliation agreement that made Maimonides a university hospital and the Brooklyn campus of Albert Einstein College of Medicine. In July 2021, Maimonides Medical Center announced an affiliation with New York Community Hospital, fully expanding a partnership that began with a clinical services agreement in 2018. Maimonides Medical Center will co-operate the smaller, 134-bed hospital.

== Innovations ==
Several innovations in clinical medicine have occurred at Maimonides. In 1961, the commercial pacemaker was developed in the Maimonides Research Laboratory. The same laboratory was co-developer of the intra-aortic balloon pump in 1970. Implantation of first partial mechanical heart was performed in the hospital in 1966. The following year, the second human heart transplant in the world (and the first in the US) was performed at Maimonides by Dr. Adrian Kantrowitz. Several other technical feats were achieved by the clinicians in the hospital, such as the first needle aspiration biopsy in the US in 1981, the first robotic surgery for pediatric patients in the US in 2001, and the first angioplasty during a heart attack in 1983.

In 2007, The New York Times reported that in an analysis of about 5,000 hospitals by the Department of Health and Human services, Maimonides was one of the 50 hospitals with the lowest mortality rates. In 2010, Maimonides received the HealthGrades Distinguished Hospital Award for Clinical Excellence, ranking it among the top 5% of hospitals in the entire nation for overall quality outcomes. Maimonides was also listed among the top 5 individual hospitals in New York State for cardiology services, coronary interventional procedures, stroke treatment, and gastrointestinal medical services.

=== Maimonides Park ===
In May 2021, the Brooklyn Cyclones minor league baseball team announced their ballpark would be named Maimonides Park in a naming-rights deal with Maimonides Medical Center.

== Information technology ==
Maimonides Medical Center is a pioneer in implementing health information technology. and is consistently ranked one of the "Most Wired" Hospitals.

== Six Centers of Excellence ==
- The Cancer Center.
- The Brooklyn Breast Cancer Program at the Maimonides Medical Center is Brooklyn's first dedicated, multi-specialty group breast cancer program. The program is headquartered in the Gilbert Rivera Pavilion and is a beautiful, spa-like facility that features live plants, water features and the highest technology available including tomosynthesis mammography, 3T MRI and high resolution ultrasound. The program is accredited by the National Accreditation Program for Breast Centers (American College of Surgeons), the Commission on Cancer and is a three time Breast Imaging Center of Excellence (American College of Radiology). The program has treated more than 4,000 women with primary breast cancer since 2008 and is recognized as one of America's top programs. The program is directed by Dr. Patrick Ivan Borgen who, prior to joining Maimonides, was the Chief Breast Cancer Surgeon at Memorial Sloan-Kettering Cancer Center in Manhattan for 15 years.
- Maimonides Infants & Children's Hospital of Brooklyn. The Stella and Joseph Payson Birthing Center handles more births than any other hospital in New York State.
- The ACE "Acute Care for the Elderly" Unit focuses on elderly patients, their families and their home environments.
- The Jaffe Stroke Center. Maimonides has received the HealthGrades Stroke Care Excellence Award for 2008, 2009 and 2010.
- The Cardiac Institute offers invasive and noninvasive, medical and surgical, adult and pediatric care. The Cardiac Institute is a partnership between referring doctors, cardiologists, cardiothoracic surgeons, nurses and professional staff. Maimonides has received the HealthGrades Cardiac Care Excellence Award (2009, 2010) and the HealthGrades Coronary Intervention Excellence Award (2008, 2009 and 2010).

== Diversity ==
Due to its culturally diversified location, Maimonides has recruited multilingual physicians, nurses, and staff. There are translators for 67 languages available through a commercially available service.

The hospital also serves a large Orthodox Jewish population in Borough Park and provides religious accommodations including Shabbat elevators, Yiddish-speaking staff and an on-site synagogue that holds daily and Shabbat prayer services.

== Designations ==
- Level I Adult Trauma Center
- Level II Pediatric Trauma Center
- Comprehensive Stroke Center
- Regional Perinatal Center

== Notable deaths ==
- Jacob Bosniak (1887–1963)
- Norbert Pearlroth (1893–1983)
