= Lefferts General Hospital =

Defunct Brooklyn, New York hospital

Coordinates: 40°39′45″N 73°56′45″W

Geography
- Location: New York City, New York, United States

Services
- Beds: 160

History
- Closed: 1978

Links
- Lists: Hospitals in New York State

Lefferts General Hospital was "a 160-bed private hospital" at 460 Lefferts Avenue opened in 1958 in the former Crown Heights Hospital, built in 1928.

The hospital, which closed in 1978, was on a list of 11 hospitals that the State Health Department attempted to close in 1976, allegedly "to fill up the municipals." In 1979 the building was converted into a dormitory to house 400 Iranian boys, age 10 to 22, who came to the United States "after the fall of the Shah."

In 1993 the building was demolished for a girl's yeshiva.
