= Brooklyn Hebrew Maternity Hospital =

Defunct Brooklyn hospital

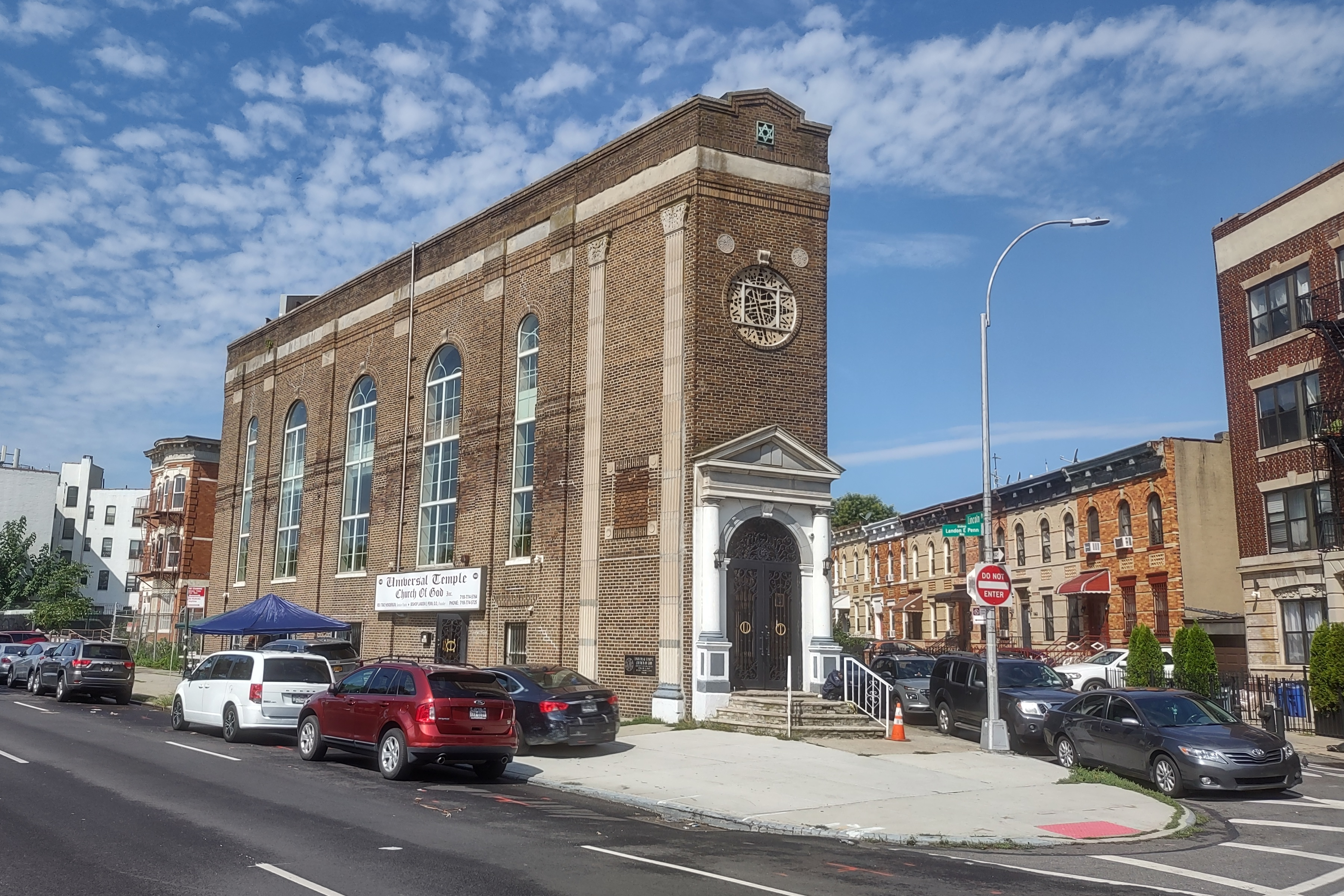

Geography
- Location: Brooklyn, New York, United States
- Coordinates: 40°40′08″N 73°55′19″W

Organization
- Type: Specialist

Services
- Speciality: Maternity hospital

History
- Opened: 1921
- Closed: before 1930

Links
- Lists: Hospitals in New York State

Brooklyn Hebrew Maternity Hospital, which opened in 1921, was located at 1395 Eastern Parkway. This four-story building previously housed Maternity Hospital of Brownsville and East New York.

The hospital included "two separate kitchens to observe the dietary laws." Other features included:

- two delivery rooms
- one operating room
- space for twenty patients in a large ward
- ten private rooms.

The hospital grounds also had a secondary structure for doing laundry.

== Brooklyn Women's Hospital ==
Brooklyn Hebrew Maternity Hospital closed; the 1395 Eastern Parkway building served as Brooklyn Women's Hospital August 1, 1930 through 1966.
