= Boro Park General Hospital =

Brooklyn hospital

Geography
- Location: 4413-4421 Fifteenth Avenue, Brooklyn, New York, United States
- Coordinates: 40°38′06″N 73°59′06″W

Organization
- Care system: Private
- Type: General

History
- Former names: Borough Park General Hospital; Brooklyn Doctors Hospital; Boro Park Maternity Hospital
- Opened: 1920s
- Closed: 1960

Links
- Lists: Hospitals in New York State
- Other links: Hospitals in Brooklyn

Boro Park General Hospital (sometimes written Borough Park General Hospital), was a 1920s to 1960 hospital whose Brooklyn address concurrently had one of two other names. The 1925-built structure is now a school.

== History ==
Boro Park General Hospital, (4413-4421 Fifteenth Avenue) included Boro Park Maternity Hospital, which was bought by "Dr. Philip Mininberg, an obstetrician" and renamed Brooklyn Doctors Hospital. The hospital's maternity annex, built in 1925, was sufficiently separate so that during a 1935 fire that "filled the maternity structure with smoke" three doctors and ten nurses moved the ground floor mothers and babies to the General Hospital "next door."

They also owned the 45th street corner property across Fifteenth Avenue, and they had a nursing school. After a fire, that property (4420 15th Avenue) was torn down and the lot remained vacant until 1986.

== See also ==
- List of hospitals in Brooklyn
