= Bay Ridge Hospital =

Brooklyn hospital

Geography
- Location: Brooklyn, New York, United States
- Coordinates: 40.6333°N 74.0226°W

Services
- Beds: 96

History
- Former name: Bay Ridge Sanitorium
- Opened: 1912
- Closed: after 1926

Links
- Lists: Hospitals in New York State

Bay Ridge Hospital's Brooklyn building became a nursing home.

== History ==
Pre-World War I plans to build a hospital at Seventh Avenue, to be named Bay Ridge Hospital, were altered, and that location became Victory Memorial Hospital, as "a monument to the soldiers of the section who died in service." The result was described as "There would be no more Bay Ridge Hospital. Or would there?"

A series of steps led to what actually became Bay Ridge Hospital:

- In 1912 "a group of local doctors" bought and converted a mansion "on Ovington Avenue, between Third and Fourth" into what was named "Bay Ridge Sanitarium, which had 12 beds."
- In 1920 "a fireproof, one-story maternity ward was built."
- By 1926 they had added space to the fire-vulnerable Sanitarium, and they had a total of 96 beds.

After a major fire, they rebuilt, resulting in a five-story fireproof 437 Ovington Avenue main building and, across the street, "the hospital purchased 438 Ovington Avenue for use as its nurses’ home."

The 438 building "no longer exists" and 437 became "St. Nicholas Home for the elderly."
