= List of hospitals in New York City =

This is a list of hospitals in the five boroughs of New York City, sorted by hospital name, with addresses and brief descriptions of their formation and development. Hospital names were obtained from these sources:

== Hospitals ==
- Manhattan:
- The Bronx:
- Brooklyn:
- Queens:
- Staten Island:

== Closed hospitals ==
Includes former names of hospitals

- Manhattan:
- The Bronx:
- Brooklyn:
- Queens:
- Staten Island:
