= List of deans and notable people at the NYU Grossman School of Medicine =

This list includes deans, notable alumni and faculty of NYU Grossman School of Medicine.

== List of deans ==
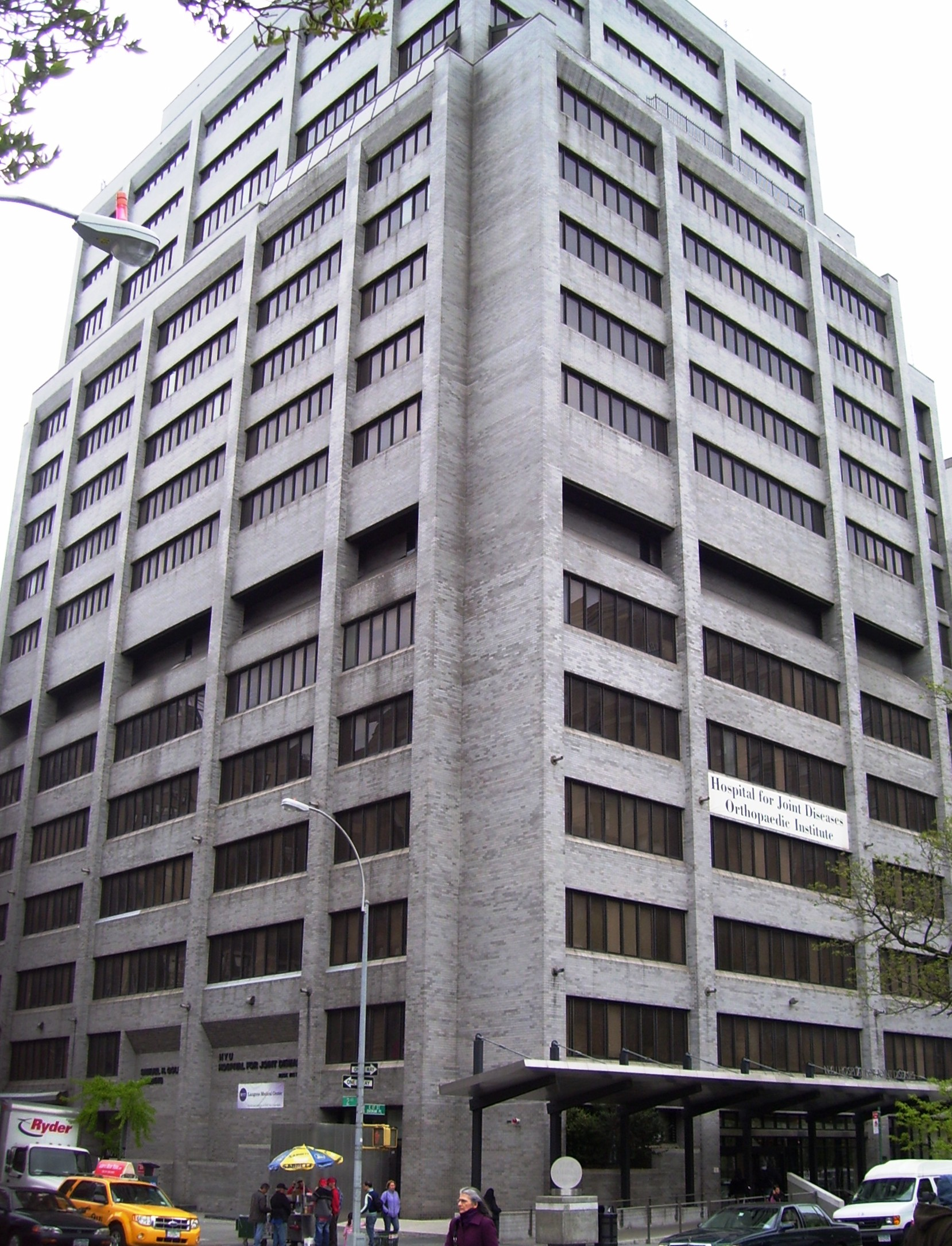
The NYU Langone Orthopedic Hospital on Second Avenue at East 17th Street

- John W. Draper, president of the faculty (1850–1873)
- Alfred C. Post, president of the faculty (1873–1877)
- Charles Inslee Pardee, dean (1877–1897)
- Egbert Le Fevre, acting dean (1897–1898)
- Edward G. Janeway, dean (1898–1905)
- Egbert Le Fevre, dean (1905–1914)
- William H. Park, acting dean (1914–1915)
- Samuel A. Brown, dean (1915–1932)
- John H. Wyckoff, dean (1932–1937)
- Currier McEwen, dean (1937–1955)
- Donal Sheehan, acting dean (1943–1954), dean (1955–1960)
- S. Bernard Wortis, dean (1960–1963)
- Saul J. Farber, acting dean (1963–1966)
- Lewis Thomas, dean (1966–1969)
- Ivan L. Bennett Jr., director-dean (1970–1982)
- Saul J. Farber, acting dean (1979–1987), dean (1987–1997)
- Noel L. Cohen, interim provost & interim dean (1997–1998)
- Robert M. Glickman, dean (1998–2007)
- Robert I. Grossman, dean & chief executive officer (2007–2025)
- Alec C. Kimmelman, dean & chief executive officer (2025–present)

== Notable people ==
=== Alumni ===
- Arthur Agatston, cardiologist, MD, 1973, author of The South Beach Diet
- Naomi Amir, pediatric neurologist, MD 1952, established first pediatric neurology clinic in Israel
- Mercy Amua-Quarshie, obstetrician-gynecologist
- Glover Crane Arnold, 1873, instructor of anatomy and surgery at Bellevue Hospital Medical College and New York University's Medical College
- Michael Baden, anatomic and forensic pathologist
- Solomona A. Berson, alumnus class of 1945
- Hermann M. Biggs, alumnus class of 1883
- Martin J. Blaser, professor, MD, 1973, established the Foundation for Bacteria
- Simon R. Blatteis (1876–1968), MD 1898, New York pathologist and head of the city's public health efforts; also a faculty member of the school
- Richard A. Cash, global health researcher
- Patricia Charache, MD 1957, microbiologist and infectious disease specialist
- Samuel Charache, hematologist, discoverer of the first effective treatment for sickle cell disease
- Stella Chess, alumna class of 1939
- May Edward Chinn (1896–1980), first Black woman to graduate from Bellevue Hospital Medical College
- James Cimino (1928–2010), internal medicine and palliative care, co-inventor of the Cimino fistula
- Douglas Cines, MD, 1972, hematologist and professor, Perelman School of Medicine at the University of Pennsylvania,
- Samuel Cochran (1871–1952), medical missionary who worked in Eastern China for over 20 years
- Barry S. Coller, MD, 1970, vice president of Rockefeller University
- Charles Rea Dickson, 1881, radiologist, electrotherapist, co-founder of the CNIB Foundation
- Edward C. Franklin, MD, pioneering immunologist
- Joseph Goldberger, discovered pellagra killing thousands of southerners in the 1920s, saved millions of lives figuring out a lack of vitamin B12 caused the disease
- William C. Gorgas, 22nd Surgeon General of the US Army, discovered vector of yellow fever in Panama
- Arthur Gottlieb, immunologist, AIDS researcher, professor at Tulane Medical School
- Daniel O. Griffin, MD, infectious disease specialist
- George Grunberger, MD, FACP, 1977
- Sidney V. Haas, MD, pioneer in celiac disease research
- William A. Hammond, alumnus class of 1848
- Frederick W. Hatch, MD, medical pioneer in Sacramento, California, former secretary of the California Board of Health (precursor to the California Department of Public Health)
- Henry Drury Hatfield, MD, 1904, United States Senate (1929–1935)
- William Howard Hay, 1891, founded the East Aurora Sun and Diet Sanatorium
- Kurt Hirschhorn, Austrian-born American pediatrician, medical geneticist, and cytogeneticist
- John Howland, pediatrician, MD, 1897
- Elizabeth Jonas, MD 1986, physician, neuroscientist and professor, Yale School of Medicine
- Eric R. Kandel, psychoanalyst, psychiatrist, MD 1955, 2000 Nobel Prize in Physiology or Medicine
- Augustus C. Kinney (1871), noted expert on tuberculosis at the turn of the 20th century
- Gerald Klerman, psychiatrist and researcher
- Linda Laubenstein, HIV/AIDS researcher
- Andrew Caldwell Mailer, member of the Wisconsin State Senate 1897–1901
- Valentino Mazzia (1922–1999), forensic anesthesiologist
- Aaron E. Miller, neurologist, first chairman of the Multiple Sclerosis section of the American Academy of Neurology
- Matthew Mirones, former member of the New York State Assembly
- Raymond Rocco Monto, orthopedic surgeon, researcher, writer
- Frank Netter, medical artist and author, MD, 1931
- Norman Orentreich, MD, dermatologist, father of modern hair transplantation, creator of Clinique, and the first president of the American Society for Dermatologic Surgery
- Louis A. Perrotta, surgeon, medical researcher, academic, and hospital founder
- Walter Reed, discoverer of the vector for yellow fever
- Nicholas P. Restifo, immunologist researcher
- Walton T. Roth, psychiatrist researcher
- Albert Sabin, medical researcher, MD, 1931, developer of the oral vaccine for polio and President of the Weizmann Institute of Science
- Arthur Sackler, MD, former executive of Purdue Pharma
- Richard Sackler, MD, former chairman and president of Purdue Pharma, widely implicated in US opioid epidemic
- Jonas Salk, medical researcher, MD, 1938, discoverer of the Salk vaccine (the first polio vaccine)
- Rosalyn Scott, first African-American woman to become a thoracic surgeon
- Sam Switzer, MD, medical researcher, class of 1956
- William James Wanless, MD (F.A.C.S.) 1889
- Gerald Weissmann, cell biologist, liposome discovery, rheumatologist, 1954
- Ruth White (born 1951), Olympic fencer

=== Current faculty ===
- Dafna Bar-Sagi, PhD, professor of Biochemistry and Molecular Pharmacology and chief scientific officer
- Jef D. Boeke, PhD, National Academy of Sciences
- Maurice Brodie, polio researcher
- György Buzsáki, MD, PhD, National Academy of Sciences
- Aravinda Chakravarti, professor, Department of Medicine
- Claude Desplan, PhD, National Academy of Sciences
- Orrin Devinsky, MD
- Steven Flanagan, professor and chairman of the Department of Rehabilitation Medicine
- William L. Goldberg, assistant professor and assistant director of Emergency Medicine, and published author
- Avram Hershko, adjunct professor, 2004 Nobel Prize in Chemistry
- Dan Littman, professor of Microbiology and Pathology; HHMI investigator
- Rodolfo Llinas, professor of Physiology & Neuroscience
- Kathryn J Moore, PhD, National Academy of Sciences and director of the Cardiovascular Research Center
- Evgeny Nudler, professor of Biochemistry and Molecular Pharmacology; HHMI investigator
- Michele Pagano, professor and chair of Biochemistry and Molecular Pharmacology; HHMI investigator
- William N. Rom, Sol and Judith Bergstein Professor of Medicine and Environmental Medicine, emeritus
- David D. Sabatini, MD, PhD, Frederick L. Ehrman Professor Emeritus of Cell Biology and research professor, Department of Cell Biology
- Regina Sullivan, PhD, professor of Child & Adolescent Psychiatry
- Richard Tsien, DPhil
- Frank J. Veith, MD, professor of Surgery, pioneer in both open and minimally invasive vascular surgery
- Jan T. Vilcek, MD, PhD
- Joseph D. Zuckerman, surgeon-in-chief of NYU Langone Orthopedic Hospital

=== Former faculty ===
- Gunning S. Bedford (1806–1870)
- Baruj Benacerraf, immunologist, professor (1956–1968), 1980 Nobel Prize in Physiology or Medicine
- Joseph Dancis, former chairman, Department of Pediatrics
- Thomas Francis Jr., first person to isolate influenza virus in the United States; discovered influenza B; mentored Jonas Salk
- Charles S. Hirsch (1937–2016)
- William Holme Van Buren (1819–1883)
- L. Emmett Holt Jr., former director of Pediatrics
- Saul Krugman (1911–1995)
- Edith M. Lincoln (1891–1977)
- Otto Loewi, professor of Pharmacology, 1936 Nobel Prize in Physiology or Medicine
- Alfred Lebbeus Loomis (1831–1895)
- William Thompson Lusk, president of the Bellevue Hospital Medical College
- Colin Munro Macleod (1909–1972)
- Valentine Mott (1785–1865)
- Charles Norris (1867–1935)
- Ruth S. Nussenzweig (1928–2018)
- Severo Ochoa, professor (1942–1974), 1959 Nobel Prize in Physiology or Medicine
- Granville Sharp Pattison (1791–1851)
- Joseph P. Ransohoff, MD
- Howard A. Rusk (1901–1989)
- Oliver Sacks, professor of Neurology and author
- John E. Sarno, professor of Clinical Rehabilitation Medicine
- Lewis A. Sayre, first professor of Orthopedic Surgery in America
- Joseph Schlessinger, professor of Pharmacology (1990–2001)
- Homer Smith (1895–1962), professor and director of the Physiology Laboratories at NYU
- Stephen Smith, physician, MD, founder of American Public Health Association
- William Smith Tillet (1892–1974)
- William Welch, pathologist whose curriculum started Johns Hopkins Medical School
