= History of public health in New York City =

The History of public health in New York City has played a major role in social and political history since 1625. The main themes include history of. unsanitary condition; sanitation laws; organization of government public health agencies; provision of clean water supplies; disasters and epidemics of contagious diseases; the role of physicians and nurses; hospitals, medical schools, and philanthropies; minimizing infant and maternal mortality; changing life expectancies.

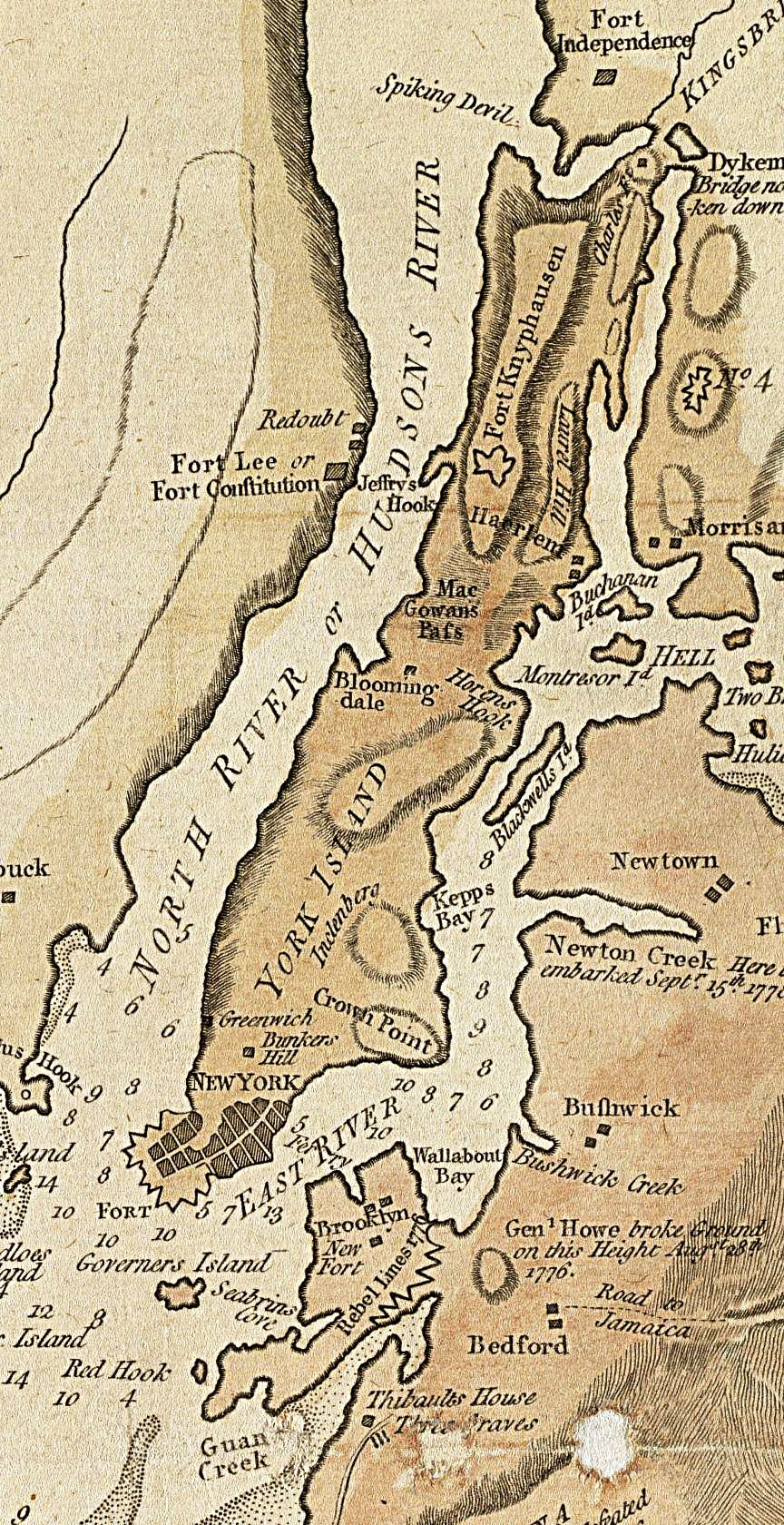
British army map of Manhattan in 1781

== Before 1865 ==
Before 1775, New York city was a relatively clean and healthy town. In the Dutch era before 1680s, cleanliness was a very high priority. By 1700 the need to help business had become an equal priority. By the 1790s it was a fast growing city facing the serious health consequences of increased population density and inadequate sanitation infrastructure. The main actions in public health in New York City before 1800 were reactions to sudden deadly epidemics. During the occupation of the city in the American Revolution, 1776–1783, the British housed thousands of prisoners of war in very unhealthy hulks in the harbor. Half of them died from disease.

The city's first health measures were primarily focused on responding to outbreaks of diseases such as smallpox, yellow fever, and diphtheria. Doctors and ministers interpreted epidemics as God's punishment for misbehavior. Prevention did not appear as a viable option. However city leaders did use the quarantine to isolate New York from epidemics in nearby cities. In 1793, with a major yellow fever epidemic in Philadelphia, leading doctors organized a committee to prevent ships and sailors from entering New York's ports.

Business needs as well as human welfare helped shape laws regulating public markets, The goals were to maintain fair prices and food quality. Early attempts to manage garbage and human waste focused on minimizing offensive smells and sights. As poor immigrants arrived after 1783, there was a steady deterioration of the sanitary conditions and a corresponding increase in the crude death rate.

Epidemics were short alarming episodes. By contrast in quiet times the government was passive. The Board of Health, established in 1805, usually did little until an epidemic brought business to a standstill. As early as 1790 a few doctors were studying which neighborhoods, ethnic groups or local conditions were connected to the most serious yellow fever outbreaks. This started a tradition of research that culminated in the 1860s, by which time experts doing in-depth statistical studies were setting public health policy.

== 1866-1897 ==
=== Metropolitan Board of Health ===
The Metropolitan Board of Health was established in 1866 by the Radical Republican who controlled the state legislature. It became a model for many American cities due to its innovative approach and effectiveness in addressing public health issues.

The Board was given extensive powers to create, execute, and judge ordinances related to public health. This comprehensive authority allowed for swift and effective action in addressing health crises. The Board leadership consisted of four police commissioners, the health officer of the Port of New York, and four commissioners appointed by the governor, three of whom were required to be physicians. This diverse makeup ensured a balance of expertise and perspectives.

Within weeks of its formation, the Board secured agreements with city butchers to clean up and relocate slaughterhouses, imposed health standards on the milk industry, improved water supply, and began cleaning city streets. When the cholera epidemic broke out in the spring of 1866, the Board successfully fought it with a stringent health code, house-to-house inspections, disinfectants, and quarantines. This resulted in a significantly lower death toll in New York City compared to other major cities.

The Board's formation was preceded by a comprehensive sanitary inspection of New York City, which revealed widespread poor living conditions in the slum districts. This data-driven approach to identifying and addressing public health issues became a standard practice adopted by other cities. Furthermore, the Board recognized the connection between housing, politics, morals, and health, setting a precedent for addressing the social determinants of health. The success of the Metropolitan Board of Health in improving public health conditions and managing disease outbreaks demonstrated the effectiveness of a centralized, empowered health authority. This model was subsequently adopted by other cities and states, shaping the future of public health administration in America.

=== Great Blizzard of 1888 ===
The Great Blizzard of 1888 was the most severe recorded blizzards in American history. The storm paralyzed the East Coast from the Chesapeake Bay to Maine, as well as the Atlantic provinces of Canada. Upwards of 10 to 58 inches (25 to 147 cm) of heavy snow fell in New York City and nearby areas. Sustained winds of more than 45 miles per hour (72 km/h) produced snowdrifts in excess of 50 feet (15 m). Railroads were shut down and people were confined to their homes for up to a week. Railway and telegraph lines were disabled, and this provided the impetus to move these pieces of infrastructure underground. Emergency services were also affected during this blizzard.

== 1898–1945 ==
Cleanliness was a heavily promoted virtue, supported by the middle class and led by the public health community of physicians and experts. Street cleaning became a major item of the city budget and produced the sort of jobs that the machines wanted to distribute to their working class clientele. Horses were used—in 1900 there were 200,000 of them in the city, producing nearly 2,500 short tons (2,300 t) of manure daily. It accumulated in the streets and was swept to the sides like snow. The stench was so strong that urbanites welcomed the newfangled motor vehicles as a profound relief.

The city took the lead internationally to combat diphtheria, an often fatal disease that struck thousands of children annually. Researchers applied laboratory-based advances in bacteriology and immunology to the treatment and prevention of this disease, thereby eradicating it as a major threat.

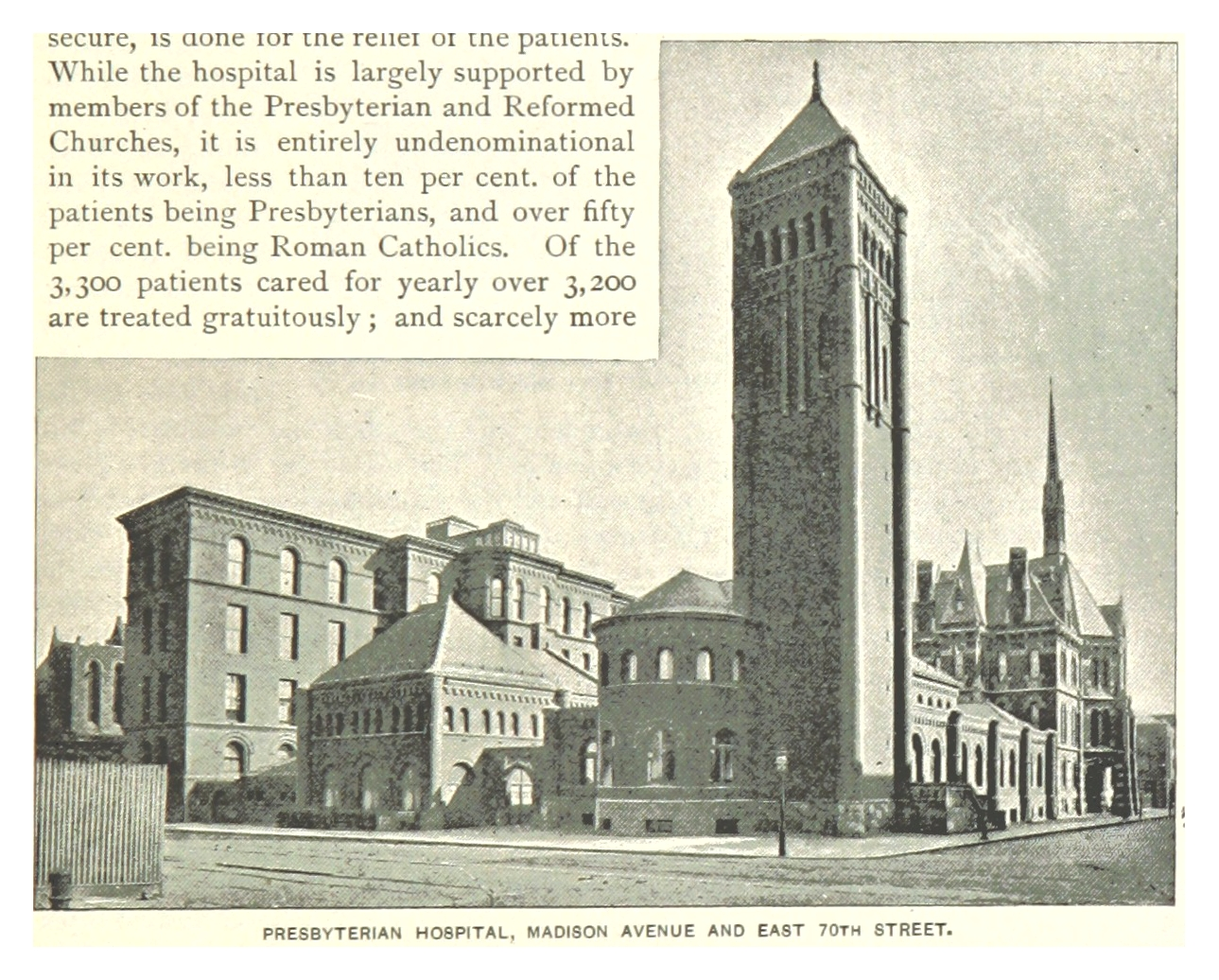
Presbyterian Hospital, 1893

=== Private hospitals: From charity to upscale science and luxury ===
According to historian Mike Wallace, in the early 20th century, a significant shift occurred in the city's private hospitals. In 1911 came the partnership of Presbyterian Hospital with Columbia University College of Physicians and Surgeons, In 1912 New York Hospital forged its own alliance with Cornell University Medical College. These collaborations marked a pivot towards medical education and scientific research, fundamentally altering how these institutions operated and who they served. Previously, 19th-century religious and charitable hospitals functioned much like public ones, primarily caring for the sick poor. Their focus was on care rather than cures, with little integration of medical practice. Wallace argues that the emergence of scientific medicine changed everything. Improved antiseptic practices made hospitals the ideal location for surgery, as medical advancements rendered home operations increasingly difficult. Hospitals offered doctors crucial technical resources and supported their professional independence. They also employed trained assistants, often women, who helped physicians efficiently treat more patients. This evolution solidified hospitals as central hubs for medical practice. Despite receiving funding from corporate philanthropists for new facilities, hospitals faced escalating operational costs. To remain viable, they began targeting wealthier patients, who had previously only sought hospital care in emergencies. To attract this new clientele, hospital boards redesigned their institutions to mimic luxury hotels. For example, Roosevelt Hospital marketed its private patients' pavilion as a refined choice for individuals with "the most cultivated tastes."

=== 1916 polio epidemic. ===
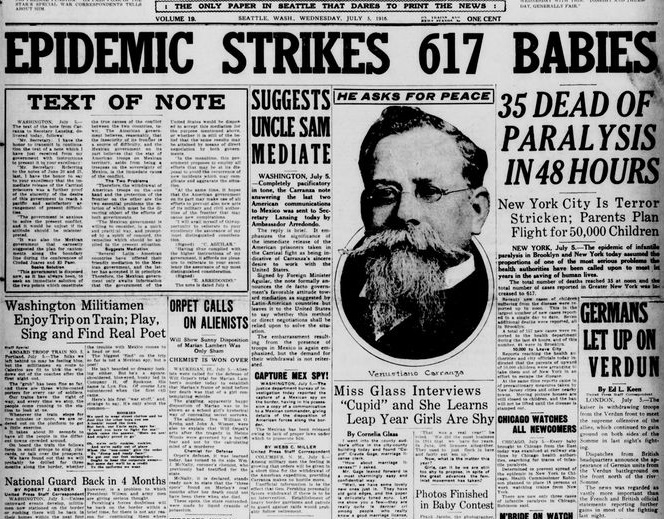

The 1916 New York City polio epidemic was an infectious disease epidemic of polio ultimately infecting several thousand people, and killing over two thousand, primarily in the borough of Brooklyn. The epidemic was officially announced in June 1916, and a special field force was assembled under the authority of Dr. Simon R. Blatteis of the New York City Health Department's Bureau of Preventable Diseases, with broad authority to quarantine those infected with polio and institute hygiene measures thought to slow the transmission of the disease. Polio was a poorly understood disease in this era, and no polio vaccine existed at this time. Official efforts to stem its spread consisted primarily of quarantines, the closure of public places, and the use of chemical disinfectants to cleanse areas where the disease had been present. Special polio clinics were established at various locations in the city for the treatment and quarantine of patients. Many informal remedies or preventative measures were tried by the frightened population, while public activities largely fell silent. Ultimately, the epidemic subsided in the winter months, with the cause remaining a mystery to investigators and the public.

=== Spanish flu pandemic of 1918-1919 ===
New York City suffered about 30,000 deaths due to influenza or pneumonia out of a population of roughly 5.6 million in the worldwide "Spanish flu" epidemic of 1918–1919. The pandemic disproportionately affected young adults with a doubling of deaths among 15- to 24-year-olds. Health officials reacted vigorously. They set up more than 150 emergency health districts and centers for home care and case reporting. Hospitals, gymnasia, and armories were set up to care for the sick. They imposed a maritime quarantine for incoming ship traffic arriving from high impact cities. They mounted a large-scale health education campaign and regulated access to public spaces such as schools and theaters, which remained open under careful monitoring. The police enforced anti-spitting measures.

=== Stephen Smith ===
Stephen Smith (1823–1922) was a New York City surgeon and civic leader who made important contributions to medical education, nursing education, public health, housing improvement, mental health reform, charity oversight, and urban environmentalism. Smith maintained an active medical practice, was an attending physician at Bellevue Hospital for thirty-seven years, and authored three surgical texts, but he was best known for his public service. Three mayors, seven governors, and two U.S. presidents appointed Smith to a half century of high public responsibility. In 1922, Columbia University President Nicholas Murray Butler awarded him the school's highest honor and pronounced Smith, “the most interesting figure in American medicine and in American public service today.” The New York Academy of Medicine initiated the annual Stephen Smith Medal for lifetime achievement in public health in 2005.

== 1946-1977 ==
See 1966 New York City smog for a famous photograph by Neal Boenzi. It shows a black-and-white, panoramic view of New York City on November 24, 1966. A hazy, smoky gas overlays the entire city like a blanket, with a fairly clear skyline only in the far distance at the horizon. Near the closest buildings, the smog appears thin and wispy. The smog appears thicker and thicker around buildings that are farther away from the photographer's position, until shorter buildings near the horizon are almost entirely shrouded and impossible to see under a thick layer of smog. Near the horizon, the clustered tops of tall skyscrapers emerge from within the smog.

The November 1966 smog was a major air-pollution episode and environmental disaster, coinciding with that year's Thanksgiving holiday weekend. Smog covered the city and its surrounding area from November 23 to 26, filling the city's air with damaging levels of several toxic pollutants: carbon monoxide, sulfur dioxide, smoke and particulate matter. Air pollution levels reached unprecedented heights, with the pollution index hitting 60.6, which was 10 points higher than the "emergency" mark. Visibility was severely reduced, and the air had a yellowish tinge and greasy appearance. Over 200 residents died from it. It was the third major smog in the city, following events of similar scale in 1953 and 1963.

1968 saw a nine-day strike by sanitation workers. Quality of life in New York reached a nadir during this strike, as mounds of garbage caught fire, and strong winds whirled the filth through the streets. With the schools shut down, the police engaged in a slowdown, firefighters threatening job actions, the city awash in garbage, and racial and religious tensions breaking to the surface, Mayor John Lindsay called the last six months of 1968 "the worst of my public life."

== Since 1978 ==
=== September 11 terror attack ===
On September 11, 2001, terrorists hijacked four airplanes and drove two of them into the Twin Towers of the World Trade Center. The two buildings collapsed killing about 2,700 people inside. Thousands of rescue personnel and nearby residents suffered long term negative health consequences.

=== Hurricanes Irene (2011) and Sandy (2012) ===
Hurricane Irene brought a destructive storm surge to New York City on the evening of August 24–25, 2011. In Manhattan, the Hudson River flooded in the Meatpacking District. The winds knocked down many trees and power lines, leaving almost 350,000 homes and businesses without power in Nassau and Suffolk counties.

Hurricane Sandy brought another destructive storm surge to New York City on the evening of October 29, 2012, flooding numerous streets, tunnels and subway lines in Lower Manhattan and other areas of the city and cutting off electricity in many parts of the city and its suburbs. City public schools closed for four days. CUNY and NYU canceled all classes and campus activities for October 30. The New York Stock Exchange was closed for trading for two days, the first weather closure of the exchange since 1985. It was also the first two-day weather closure since the Great Blizzard of 1888. The East River overflowed its banks, flooding large sections of Lower Manhattan. Battery Park had a water surge of 13.88 ft. Seven subway tunnels under the East River were flooded. The Metropolitan Transportation Authority said that the destruction caused by the storm was the worst disaster in the 108-year history of the New York City subway system. Sea water flooded the Ground Zero construction site. Over 10 billion gallons of raw and partially treated sewage were released by the storm, 94% of which went into waters in and around New York and New Jersey.

=== COVID-19 pandemic in 2020-2022 ===
The COVID-19 pandemic was the worst public health disaster in New York since the Spanish flu of 1918.

About 44% of all residents of the metropolitan areas (including suburbs) were infected in 2020. The City's confirmed COVID-19 deaths exceeded 45,000 by August 2023, with over 5,500 additional probable deaths. The city accounted for 4% of US cases and 13% of US deaths. Covid was massively disruptive of the city’s economy, shutting down many jobs and causing massive economic declines in practically every sector, including education. Many workers relocated outside the city; many others worked from their apartments. Hospitals faced challenges related to temporary staffing, quarantine facilities, and medical and equipment supplies. The epidemic disrupted the routine health care of many inhabitants. Many experienced long delays or decided to avoid non–COVID related healthcare during the pandemic. About 40% of the residents postponed cancer screenings and 13% delayed needed mental health treatment, Emergency department visits dropped by half.

== See also ==
- List of disasters in New York City by death toll
- History of New York City
- History of public health in the United States
- History of public health in Chicago
- Water supply and sanitation in the United States
- John Duffy (medical historian)
- 1906 Tonsil Riots, in a Jewish neighborhood
- 1916 New York City polio epidemic
- 1947 New York City smallpox outbreak
- 2015 Bronx Legionnaires' disease outbreaks
- 2019 New York measles outbreak
- COVID-19 pandemic in New York City in 2020-2022
- List of hospitals in Manhattan
  - NewYork-Presbyterian Hospital
