= Charache =

Charache is a surname. Notable people with this surname include:

- Patricia Charache (1929–2015), American infectologist
- Samuel Charache (1930–2019), American haematologist, husband of Patricia
