= Vaccine misinformation =

False or misleading information related to vaccines

Misinformation related to immunization and the use of vaccines circulates in mass media and social media despite the fact that there is no serious hesitancy or debate within mainstream medical and scientific circles about the benefits of vaccination. Unsubstantiated safety concerns related to vaccines are often presented on the Internet as being scientific information. A large proportion of internet sources on the topic are inaccurate which can lead people searching for information to form misconceptions relating to vaccines.

Although opposition to vaccination has existed for centuries, the internet and social media have recently facilitated the spread of vaccine-related misinformation. Intentional spreading of false information and conspiracy theories have been propagated by the general public and celebrities. Active disinformation campaigns by foreign actors are related to increases in negative discussions online and decreases in vaccination use over time.

Misinformation related to vaccination leads to vaccine hesitancy which fuels disease outbreaks. As of 2019, prior to the COVID-19 pandemic, vaccine hesitancy was considered one of the top 10 threats to global health by the World Health Organization.

== Extent ==
A survey by the Royal Society for Public Health found that 50% of the parents of children under the age of five regularly encountered misinformation related to vaccination on social media. On Twitter, bots, masked as legitimate users were found creating false pretenses that there are nearly equal number of individuals on both sides of the debate, thus spreading misleading information related to vaccination and vaccine safety. The accounts created by bots used additional compelling stories related to anti-vaccination as clickbait to drive up their revenue and expose users to malware.

A study revealed that Michael Manoel Chaves, an ex-paramedic who was sacked by the NHS for Gross Misconduct after stealing from two patients he was treating, is involved with the anti-vaccine community. These are the type of individuals who were previously interested in alternative medicine or conspiracy theories. Another study showed that a predisposition to believe in conspiracy theories was negatively correlated to the intention of individuals to get vaccinated.

Spreading vaccine misinformation can lead to financial rewards by posting on social media and asking for donations or fundraising for anti-vaccination causes.

== List of popular misinformation ==
The World Health Organization has classified vaccine related misinformation into five topic areas. These are: threat of disease (vaccine preventable diseases are harmless), trust (questioning the trustworthiness of healthcare authorities who administer vaccines), alternative methods (such as alternative medicine to replace vaccination), effectiveness (vaccines do not work) and safety (vaccines have more risks than benefits).

=== Vaccination causes idiopathic conditions ===
- False: Vaccines cause autism: The established scientific consensus is that there is no link between vaccines and autism. No ingredients in vaccines, including thiomersal, have been found to cause autism. The incorrect claim that vaccines cause autism dates to a paper published in 1998 and has since been retracted. In the late 1990s' a physician at Royal Free Hospital by the name of Andrew Wakefield published an article claiming to have found an explanation for autism. He first reported a relationship between measles virus and colonic lesions in Crohn's disease, which was soon disproved. He next hypothesized that the MMR triad vaccine, the vaccine for measles, triggered colonic lesions that disrupted the colon's permeability, causing neurotoxic proteins to enter the bloodstream, eventually reach the brain and result in autistic symptoms. The article was partially retracted by The Lancet as of March 6, 2004, after journalist Brian Deer raised issues including the possibility of severe research misconduct, conflict of interest and probable falsehood. The paper was fully retracted as of February 2, 2010, following an investigation of the flawed study by Britain's General Medical Council which supported those concerns. The British Medical Association took disciplinary action against Wakefield on May 24, 2010, revoking his right to practice medicine. There are some indications that people with autism may also tend to have gastrointestinal disorders like an unusually shaped intestinal tract and micro bacteria alterations. However, multiple large-scale studies of more than half a million children have been carried out without finding a causal link between MMR vaccines and autism.
- False: Vaccines can cause the same disease that one is vaccinated against: A vaccine causing complete disease is extremely unlikely (with the sole exception of the oral polio vaccine, which is no longer in use as a result). In traditional vaccines, the virus is attenuated (weakened) and thus it is not possible to contract the disease, while in newer technologies like mRNA vaccines the vaccine does not contain the full virus.
- False: Vaccines can cause harmful side effects and even death: Vaccines are very safe. Most adverse events after vaccination are mild and temporary, such as a sore throat or mild fever, which can be controlled by taking paracetamol after vaccination.
- False: Vaccines can cause infertility: There is no supporting evidence or data that any vaccines have a negative impact on women's fertility. In 2020, as COVID-19 numbers rose and vaccinations started to roll out, the misinformation around vaccines causing infertility began to circulate. The false narrative began that mRNA vaccine-induced antibodies which act against the SARS-CoV-2 spruce protein could also attack the placental protein syncytin-1, and that this could cause infertility. There is no evidence to support this. A joint statement of the American College of Obstetricians and Gynecologists, the American Society for Reproductive Medicine, and the Society for Maternal-Fetal Medicine clearly states “that there is no evidence that the vaccine can lead to loss of fertility”.

There are numerous studies and surveys that purport to show an association between vaccines and a range of conditions: from ear infections and asthma, to ADHD and autism; however most of the studies have been retracted, or are unpublished, and the surveys are non peer-reviewed. One of the studies in question has been criticised for only calculating an unadjusted observational association (as opposed to a correlation or causation).

=== Alternative remedies to vaccination ===
Responding to misinformation, some may resort to complementary or alternative medicine and homeopathy as an alternative to vaccination. Those who believe in this narrative view vaccines as 'toxic and adulterating' while seeing alternative 'natural' methods as safe and effective. Some of the misinformation circulating around alternate remedies for vaccination include:

- False: Eating yoghurt cures human papillomavirus: Eating any natural product does not prevent or cure HPV.
- False: Homeopathy can be used as an alternative to protect against measles: Homeopathy has been shown to be ineffective against preventing measles.
- False: Quercetin, zinc, vitamin D, and other nutritional supplements can protect from/treat COVID-19: none of the above can prevent or treat COVID-19.
- False: Nosodes are an alternative to vaccines: There is no evidence supporting nosodes' effectiveness in preventing or treating infectious diseases.

=== Vaccination as genocide ===
Misinformation that forced vaccination could be used to "depopulate" the earth circulated in 2011 by misquoting Bill Gates. There is misinformation implying that vaccines (particularly the mRNA vaccine) could alter DNA in the nucleus. mRNA in the cytosol is very rapidly degraded before it would have time to gain entry into the cell nucleus. (mRNA vaccines must be stored at very low temperatures to prevent mRNA degradation.) Retrovirus can be single-stranded RNA (just as SARS-CoV-2 vaccine is single-stranded RNA) which enters the cell nucleus and uses reverse transcriptase to make DNA from the RNA in the cell nucleus. A retrovirus has mechanisms to be imported into the nucleus, but other mRNA lack these mechanisms. Once inside the nucleus, creation of DNA from RNA cannot occur without a primer, which accompanies a retrovirus, but which would not exist for other mRNA if placed in the nucleus. Thus, mRNA vaccines cannot alter DNA because they cannot enter the nucleus, and because they have no primer to activate reverse transcriptase.

=== Vaccine components contain forbidden additives ===
Anti-vaxxers emphasize that the components in vaccines such as thiomersal and aluminum are capable for causing health hazards. Thiomersal is a harmless component in vaccines which is used to maintain its sterility, and there are no known adverse effects due to it. Aluminium is included in the vaccine as an adjuvant, and it has low toxicity even in large amounts. Formaldehyde included in some vaccines is in negligibly low quantities and it is harmless. Narratives that COVID-19 vaccines contain haram products were circulated in Muslim communities.

=== Vaccines are part of a governmental/pharmaceutical conspiracy ===
The Big Pharma conspiracy theory, that pharmaceutical companies operate for sinister purposes and against the public good, has been used in the context of vaccination. The theory states that vaccines have unusual substances in them and that they are only made for an increase in profit.

=== Vaccine preventable diseases are harmless ===
There is a common misconception that vaccine-preventable diseases such as measles are harmless. However, measles remains a serious disease, and can cause severe complications or even death. Vaccination is the only way to protect against measles.

=== Personal anecdotes about harmed individuals ===
Personal anecdotes and sometimes false stories are circulated about vaccination. Misinformation about vaccines and the falsified links between vaccinations and autism have been spread, including claims that people died due to COVID-19 vaccines. Through the spread of false media, civilians are led to incorrectly believe that vaccinations are the leading cause of autism, even though autism occurs during fetal development, not after the mother has given birth. A child's potential placement on the spectrum can be influenced by factors such as genetics, the environment, metabolic disorders, epigenetic mechanisms, and the mother consuming medication while pregnant that should not be consumed during pregnancy. Individuals who refuse to be vaccinated put themselves at risk of being exposed to—and contributing to the spread of—diseases and infections with harmful long-term effects that may cause death. Of the many experiments performed regarding the links between vaccinations and autism, none of them have conclusively proven such a link.

=== Other conspiracy theories ===
Other conspiracy theories circulated on social media have included the false notion such as;

- False: Polio is not a real disease and the symptoms are actually due to DDT poisoning: The first major documented polio outbreak in the United States occurred in 1894 in Vermont. In the early 20th century, a polio epidemic started in the west causing 6,000 deaths and leaving 27,000 people paralyzed. In 1954, the Salk Institute created the polio vaccine putting an end to the epidemic and saving millions of lives. The incorrect theory that polio was related to pesticide poisoning predates the discovery of the polio vaccine. It was proposed in 1952 by Dr. Ralph R. Scobey in an article in the Archives of Pediatrics. Scobey argued that there were similarities between the symptoms of polio and various types of poisoning, and suggested that polio outbreaks might be more likely to occur during the summer and be related to consumption of fresh fruit and vegetables. While pesticides such as DDT are dangerous, as was shown by Rachel Carson in Silent Spring in 1962, they are not dangerous in the way that Scobey believed them to be, as a cause of polio. Studies have clearly demonstrated causal relationships showing that polio is caused by a virus. Vaccines have proven effective in preventing the disease and eliminating wild poliovirus in most parts of the world.
- False: The COVID-19 vaccines contain injectable microchips to identify and track people: This conspiracy theory started circulating in 2020 claiming the COVID-19 pandemic was a cover for a plan to implant trackable microchips and Bill Gates, co-founder of Microsoft, was behind it. A YouGov poll conducted in 2020 suggested that 28% of Americans believe in this conspiracy theory. The origin of the theory is a long-term effort of Bill and Melinda Gates Foundation on sponsoring research on vaccinating people by pricking skin with an array of a large count of sharp microneedles coated with a vaccine, as well as with some fluorescent ink. The needles were made of silicon using the similar technology integrated circuits are made. Any piece of silicon resulted from this technology is called a "chip", be it an integrated circuit, a MEMS device, or something else. So the theory has arisen from the confusion of different meanings of the word "chip". In the series of research papers, the chip is just pressed against the skin with a finger to make the needles prick the skin, then the vaccine coating and fluorescent ink are transferred from the needles into skin, then the chip itself is disposed of. The ink is meant to leave a tattoo that could be visualized by irradiating the dye with the light of certain wavelengths, this way allowing to check if the tattoo was made, which is useful in the contexts when vaccination is compulsory and using more low-cost and secure alternatives like database lookups of ID card or biometrics is infeasible due to lack of infrastructure like power grid and Internet connectivity. So the chip is neither meant to be implanted, nor can physically fit into a syringe needle, as the conspiracy theory suggests.

== CDC as source of vaccine misinformation ==
As of November 19, 2025, under the leadership of HHS Secretary Robert F. Kennedy Jr., the CDC website on "Autism and Vaccines" was radically changed from its earlier September 2025 version to a new version on November 19, 2025. The revised webpage makes several false statements, contradicting long-standing scientific evidence that supports the absence of a causal link between childhood vaccines and autism. According to CDC staff, required scientific vetting for all public-facing agency webpages was entirely bypassed in this instance. As the Wall Street Journal points out, "… no association has been proven between vaccines and autism". Also, numerous medical associations and professionals immediately issued statements protesting the changes, including experts from: the Center for Infectious Disease Research and Policy (CIDRAP); Children’s Hospital of Philadelphia; Stanford University School of Medicine; Texas Children’s Hospital Center for Vaccine Development; the American Academy of Pediatrics (AAP); Harvard T.H. Chan School of Public Health; and The Autism Science Foundation.

== Impact ==
Fueled by misinformation, anti-vaccination activism is on the rise on social media and in many countries. Research has shown that viewing a website containing vaccine misinformation for 5–10 minutes decreases a person's intention to vaccinate. A 2020 study found that "large proportions of the content about vaccines on popular social media sites are anti-vaccination messages." It further found that there is a significant relationship between joining vaccine hesitant groups on social media and openly casting doubts in public about vaccine safety, as well as a substantial relationship between foreign disinformation campaigns and declining vaccination coverage.

In 2003, rumors about polio vaccines intensified vaccine hesitancy in Nigeria and led to a five-fold increase in the number of polio cases in the country over three years. A 2021 study found that misinformation about COVID-19 vaccines on social media "induced a decline in intent [to vaccinate] of 6.2 percentage points in the [United Kingdom] and 6.4 percentage points in the [United States] among those who said they would definitely accept a vaccine".

Social media is again the leading platform for the rapid spreading of vaccine misinformation during a pandemic. For example, A study in 2020 of public opinions about the developing Chinese domestic COVID-19 vaccines found around one-fifth of the post on weibo related to the vaccine claimed that the COVID-19 vaccines are generally overpriced, even though they are later being administered totally free. Many people in China also hold the belief that inactive vaccines are safer than the newly developed mRNA vaccine of SARS-Covid-2. The cause of this might be a combination of national pride and a lack of understanding of vaccine literacy.

In general, misinformation related to the COVID-19 vaccine reduced public confidence. Public acceptance of Chinese domestic COVID-19 vaccines dropped significantly due to concerns about the possible high cost. An online survey in China showed only 28.7% of the participants expressed definite interest in getting the vaccine. Most people (54.6%) held some hesitancy toward the vaccine.

=== Effects on herd immunity ===
Vaccine-related misinformation has decreased the effectiveness of herd immunity, especially for measles. The World Health Organization reported that measles vaccine compliance dropped by 3% from 2019 to 2024. In the United States, measles vaccine rates officially dropped below the herd immunity threshold of 95% during the 2023-2024 academic year. Lancet Digital Health Journal stated that there are only a few percentage points of herd immunity that make the difference between having an epidemic and not having an epidemic, highlighting just how crucial it is to maintain concrete vaccination rates. Countries such as the United States, the UK, and Ukraine have reported increased measles cases alongside misinformation campaigns for the MMR vaccine.

=== Vaccine mandate exemptions ===
Multiple states across the US offer exemptions to vaccine mandates for medical, religious, and philosophical reasons. Medical exemptions are often requested by a physician when a patient is severely immunocompromised, usually due to cancer treatment, HIV/AIDS, or other pre-existing health complications. Religious exemptions typically surround vaccines whose development involved human fetal cells. Philosophical exemptions account for any exemption that does not meet the qualifications for medical or religious exemptions; these exemptions are based in personal beliefs and are often heavily influenced by vaccine misinformation campaigns. At least ten states in the US offer such philosophical exemptions; prior to 2015, this number was higher, but a 2015 measles epidemic in California that led to over 100 measles cases resulted in policy changes that led many states to reconsider their vaccine exemption policies. After the 2015 epidemic, California eliminated non-medical vaccine exemptions.

== Measures against misinformation ==
=== Communication ===
After repeated exposure to misinformation (for example, through social media), individuals might hold misinformed mental models of the function, risk, and purpose of vaccines. The longer an individual holds misinformation, the more staunchly rooted it becomes in their mental model, making its correction and retraction all the more difficult. Over time, these models may become integral to a vaccine hesitant individual's worldview. People are likely to filter any new information they receive to fit their preexisting worldview – corrective vaccine facts are no exception to this motivated reasoning. Thus, by the time vaccine hesitant individuals arrive at the doctor's office, healthcare workers face an uphill battle. If they seek to change minds and maintain herd immunity against preventable diseases, they must do more than simply present facts about vaccines. Providers need communication strategies that effectively change minds and behavior.

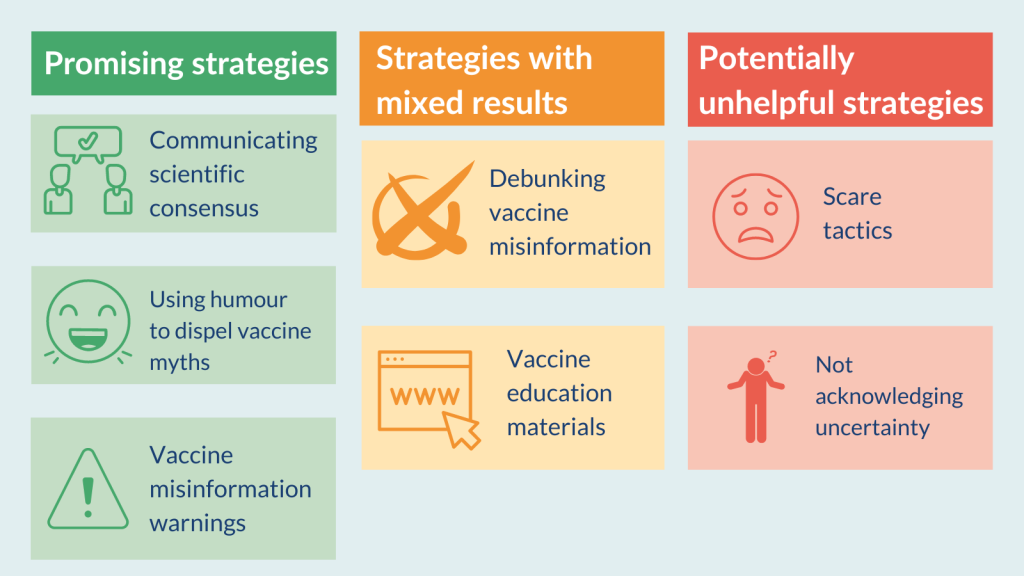
Communication strategies to tackle vaccine misinformation

Communication strategies to counter vaccine misinformation and effectively improve the intention to vaccinate include communicating the scientific consensus that vaccines are safe and effective, using humour to dispel vaccine myths, and providing vaccine misinformation warnings. Compared to these, debunking vaccine misinformation and providing vaccine education materials work less in tackling misinformation. Scare tactics, and failing to acknowledge uncertainty is not effective, and can even backfire and worsen the intention to vaccinate. Research shows that science communicators should directly counter misinformation because of its negative influence on silent audience who are observing the vaccine debate, but not engaging in it. The refutations to vaccine-related misinformation should be straightforward in order to avoid emphasizing misinformation. It is useful to pair scientific evidence with stories that connect to the belief and value system of the audience.

Interventions for parents/caregivers who make decisions about their children's vaccination are vital. Given the complexity of this problem, effective evidence-based strategies have yet to be identified. Although many wish to provide families with as much corrective information as possible, this often has unintended consequences. One study in 2013 tested four separate interventions to correct MMR vaccine misinformation and promote parental behavioral change: (1) Provide information explaining lack of evidence that MMR causes autism. (2) Present textual information about the dangers of measles, mumps, and rubella. (3) Show images of children with measles, mumps and rubella. (4) Provide a dramatic written narrative about an infant who became deathly ill from measles. Before and after each intervention, researchers measured parents' belief in the vaccine/autism misperception, their intent to vaccinate future children, and their general risk perception of the vaccine. They found that none of the interventions increased parental intent to vaccinate.

Instead, the first intervention (1) reduced misperceptions about autism, but still decreased parents' intent to vaccinate future children. Notably, this effect was significant among parents who were already the most vaccine-hesitant. This shows that corrective information may backfire. Motivated reasoning could be the mechanism behind this dynamic – no matter how many facts are provided, parents still sift through them to selectively find those that support their worldview. While the corrective information can have an effect on a specific belief, ultimately vaccine-hesitant parents often use this additional information to strengthen their original behavioral intent. Interventions three and four increased the vaccine/autism misperception and increased belief in serious vaccine side effects, respectively. This can be attributed to a potential danger priming effect – when pushed into a fearful state, parents misattribute this fear to the vaccine itself, rather than the diseases it prevents. In all cases, the facts included had little, if not counterproductive effect on future behaviors.

This work has important implications for future research. First, the study's findings revealed a disparity between beliefs and intentions – even as specific misperceptions are corrected, behavior may not change. Since reaching herd immunity for preventable diseases requires promoting a behavior – vaccination – it is important for future research to measure behavioral intent, rather than just beliefs. Second, it is imperative for all health messaging to be tested before its widespread use. Society does not necessarily know the behavioral impacts of communication interventions – they may have unintended consequences on different groups. In the case of correcting vaccine misinformation and changing vaccination behaviors, much more research is still needed to identify effective communication strategies.

Several governmental agencies, such as the Centers for Disease Control (CDC) in the United States and National Health Service (NHS) in the United Kingdom have dedicated webpages for addressing vaccine-related misinformation.

As of November 19, 2025, under the leadership of HHS Secretary Robert F. Kennedy Jr., the CDC website's information on vaccines can no longer be trusted. See #Misinformation from CDC

==== Physician-patient communication ====
A review from the Pediatric Journal of Nursing noted that more effort needs to be made by physicians in communicating vaccine effectiveness to patients and parents of patients. Many vaccine-skeptics are reported to be parents who are simply concerned for the health of their children, and scrutiny from medical professionals is unlikely to encourage them to feel comfortable vaccinating their children. The review highlighted how establishing long-term communicative relationships with skeptical parents and emphasizing that the ultimate goal is to ensure the maximum health and safety for all children. Additionally, it could be beneficial to have these conversations led by medical nursing staff who often spend more time with parents and patients and therefore may already have built prior relationships with them, opening the door to provide correct vaccine information in a trustworthy environment.

=== Social media ===
Pinterest was one of the first social media platforms to surface only trustworthy information from reliable sources on their vaccine related searches back in 2019. In 2020, Facebook announced that it would no longer allow anti-vaccination advertisements on its platform. Facebook also said it would elevate posts from the World Health Organization, UNICEF and other NGOs, in order to increase immunization rates through public health campaigns. In April 22, Meta announced that its collaboration with UNICEF had reached more than 150 million people with information about the COVID-19 vaccine via online outreach campaigns in several countries. Twitter announced that it would put a warning label on tweets containing disputed or unsubstantiated rumors about vaccination and require users to remove tweets that spread false information about vaccines. TikTok announced that it would start directing people to official health sources when they search for vaccine related information. By December 2020, YouTube had removed more than 700,000 videos containing misinformation related to COVID-19.

=== Some vaccine-preventable diseases have been eradicated ===
Vaccination has enabled the reduction of most vaccine-preventable diseases (e.g. polio has been eradicated in every country except Afghanistan and Pakistan). However, some are still prevalent and even cause epidemics in some parts of the world. If the affected population is not protected by vaccination, the disease can quickly spread from country to country. Vaccines not only protect individuals, but also lead to herd immunity if a sufficient number of people in the population have taken the vaccine.

Eradication is the permanent elimination of an infectious disease worldwide through deliberate efforts, rendering further intervention measures unnecessary. To date, the only disease that has been successfully eradicated is smallpox. Poliomyelitis was targeted for eradication by the year 2000, and significant progress was made towards this goal, with the Western Hemisphere being declared polio-free and over a year having passed without any reported cases in the Western Pacific Region of the World Health Organization. An examination of the technical feasibility of eradicating other diseases preventable by vaccines currently available in the United States suggests that measles, hepatitis B, mumps, rubella, and possibly Haemophilus influenzae type b are potential candidates for eradication. From a practical standpoint, measles appears to be the most likely candidate for the next eradication effort. Despite the challenges, eradication represents the ultimate achievement in sustainability and social justice, and even if eradication is not possible, significant improvements in control can still be made with existing vaccines and new and improved vaccines may offer further possibilities in the future.

== See also ==
- Anti-vaccine activism
- COVID-19 vaccine misinformation and hesitancy
