= Brookdale University Hospital and Medical Center =

Major teaching hospital

Coordinates: 40°39′18″N 73°54′45″W

- One Brooklyn Health
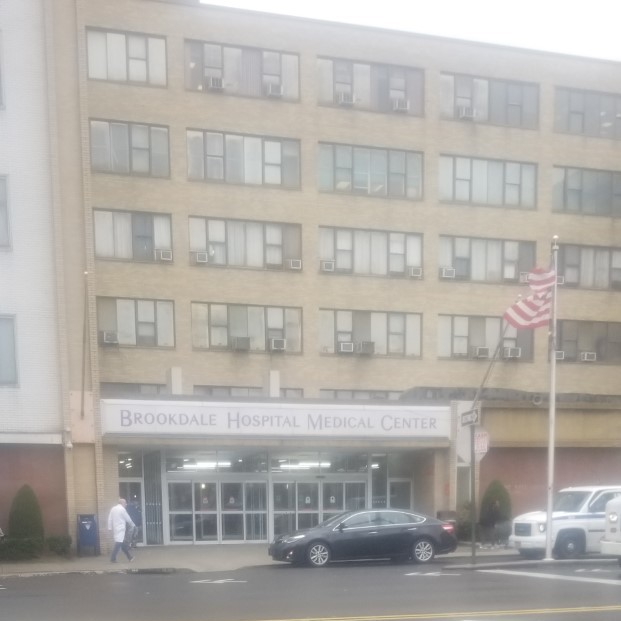

Geography
- Location: 1 Brookdale Plaza, Brooklyn, New York, United States

Organization
- Care system: Private
- Type: Teaching
- Affiliated university: New York Medical College; NYIT College of Osteopathic Medicine; New York University College of Dentistry

Services
- Emergency department: Level II trauma center
- Beds: 530

Helipads
- Helipad: No

History
- Founded: 1921

Links
- Website: www.brookdale.org
- Lists: Hospitals in New York State
- Other links: Hospitals in Brooklyn

The Brookdale University Hospital and Medical Center (often called Brookdale Hospital, or Brookdale for short) is a nonprofit 501(c)(3) medical services provider in the borough of Brooklyn, New York City. Brookdale's primary and secondary service areas together comprise 1 million residents. It serves most of Eastern Brooklyn: Brownsville, East New York, Canarsie and East Flatbush.

Brookdale became a member of the One Brooklyn Health system along with Kingsbrook Jewish Medical Center and Interfaith Medical Center upon the system's creation in 2016.

== Description ==
Brookdale is one of Brooklyn's largest voluntary nonprofit teaching hospitals, a regional tertiary care center, and is a Level II trauma center, Thrombectomy-Capable Stroke Center, Level III Perinatal Center, and AIDS center. It provides 24-hour emergency services and long-term specialty care, has outpatient programs.It provides outpatient ambulatory care services in both on campus and off site facilities. Brookdale specializes in rehabilitative medicine and long-term specialty care in its Schulman and Schachne Institute for Nursing and Rehabilitation and in addition is home to 86 units of assisted living and independent housing in the Arlene and David Schlang Pavilion, a federally subsidized housing project.

In 1970, NYU's Medical Center and School of Medicine initiated an "affilitation agreement" to enhance training and provide student exchange opportunities.

== History ==
After a decade of planning, the Brownsville and East New York Hospital opened on April 11, 1921, with one building housing 75 beds between Brownsville, East New York, and Canarsie. The first President of the Medical Board was Simon R. Blatteis, who was also a leading figure in organizing the development of the hospital. It was renamed Beth-El Hospital in 1932. The hospital, under the directorship of Jacob Rutstein, greatly expanded its facilities at that time. It became Brookdale Hospital in 1964, and Brookdale Hospital Medical Center in 1971. In 1993, Brookdale opened the first designated long term AIDS center in Brooklyn. It was later renamed the Treatment for Life Center. The Radutzky Emergency Care Pavilion was dedicated in 1982, and was designated a Level I Trauma Center in the same year (now it is a level II trauma center). A major expansion was completed in 2004. In 2005 Brookdale became a 911 receiving Stroke Center.

The hospital was under the management of MediSys Health Network for twelve years; this ended a year after Medisys's CEO and others pleaded guilty to federal charges, including bribery.

In 2009, the hospital laid off 240 employees.

In late October 2012, a few days before the expected arrival of Hurricane Sandy in New York, Brookdale Hospital was enlisted by the New York State Department of Health in the State's emergency response efforts. Brookdale was awarded $2.3 million for unreimbursed operating costs.

In 2017, it was described as "struggling."

== Facilities ==
Brookdale is both a treatment facility and an academic medical center, certified with 530 acute-care beds, and more than 50 specialty clinics. In addition, Brookdale and its affiliates comprise the following:

- 448 skilled nursing beds located in the affiliated Schulman and Schachne Institute for Nursing and Rehabilitation
- 86 units of assisted living and independent living housing in the Arlene and David Schlang Pavilion
- A comprehensive Adult Day Care Center
- A Comprehensive Health Center, an advanced 16-level, fully equipped inpatient facility
- A state-of-the art Emergency Department with a Level I Trauma Center and a full range of 24-hour emergency services
- A community mental health center, an ambulatory surgery center and a 16-chair dental suite
- OB space with Labor, Delivery, and Recovery Suites
- An Urgent Care Center
- Six primary care Brookdale Family Care Centers, located in the outlying communities
- Pharmacy – The department was the spearhead for statewide clinical services, led by the longtime New York State Board of Pharmacy President Seymour Katz, and currently led by Johnny Ha. It has many advanced clinical programs and training in PGY-1 Pharmacy Practice and the PGY-2 Ambulatory Care residency programs each enroll 2 residents per year.
