= Charles Rea Dickson =

Advocate for the blind, co-founder of CNIB

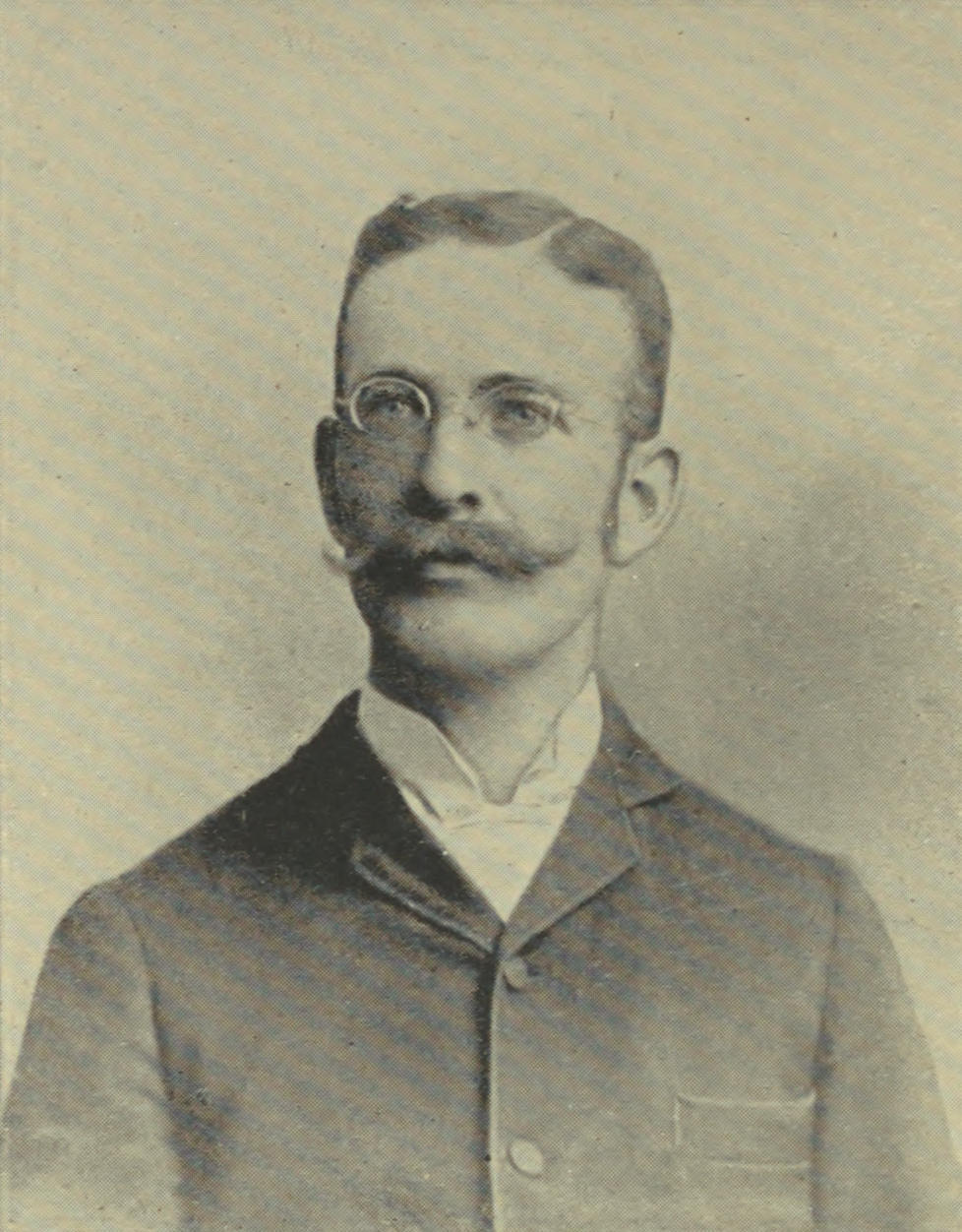
- Portrait of Dickson c. 1891
- Born: 16 or 18 December 1858; Kingston, Canada West, Province of Canada
- Died: 9 July 1938 (aged 79); Toronto, Ontario, Canada
- Resting place: Mount Pleasant Cemetery, Toronto
- Education: Queen's College Faculty of Medicine (1880); Medical College of New York University (1881)
- Medical career
- Profession: Physician
- Field: Radiology, electrotherapy
- Institutions: Toronto General Hospital; Hospital for Sick Children; St. John Ambulance
- Awards: King George VI Coronation Medal

Charles Rea Dickson (16 or 18 December 1858 – 9 July 1938), sometimes referred to as Charles Rae Dickson, was a Canadian physician, electrotherapist, radiologist, and advocate for the blind. He was the first academic radiologist in Toronto after being appointed as the "electrician on staff" at the Hospital for Sick Children. He was one of the first people to use X-rays until exposure from the radiation left him permanently blind. Following his blindness, he became a fervent advocate for the blind, co-founding the Canadian National Institute for the Blind (now the CNIB Foundation).

== Early life and education ==
Charles Rea Dickson was born on the 16th or 18th of December 1858, to John Robinson Dickson and Anne Benson. His father was a physician and a co-founder of Queen's College's medical faculty, while his sister, Anne, was one of the faculty's first female graduates. Dickson got his medical degree from the same faculty in 1880, and underwent postgraduate training at the Medical College of New York University, which he completed in 1881. While at New York University, he spent time at Bellevue Hospital, one of the pioneering facilities in public health, which likely influenced his future interest in the subject.

== Medical practice and public health advocacy ==
Following his training in New York, Dickson returned to Canada and began a practice on Wolfe Island in 1882. He then moved his practice to Kingston in 1886, before finally moving it to Toronto in 1889. Owing to his interest in electrotherapeutics, Dickson was appointed as an electrotherapist at Toronto General Hospital in 1889, and then subsequently made electrotherapist at the Hospital for Sick Children in 1890. After Wilhelm Röntgen discovered X-rays in 1895, the Hospital for Sick Children acquired an X-ray machine, and Dickson became the first academic radiologist in Toronto. By 1906, Samuel Collins had taken over as radiologist at the hospital.

While working with electrotherapy and radiology, Dickson remained an advocate for public health in Canada. Alongside George Ryerson, he helped establish the Canadian branch of St. John Ambulance in the 1880s, and the institution that would become the Canadian Red Cross in 1896. He served as the general secretary of the Canadian Red Cross, his work there being acknowledged by Queen Alexandra.

== Blindness and advocacy ==
It is unclear exactly when Dickson went blind. Some sources say that he was blinded by an X-ray experiment that failed in 1908, while other sources merely say he was blinded by 1918. There is some evidence of his vision failing in 1909. In any case, following his blindness, he became a fervent advocate for the blind in Canada. Dickson wrote letters to several people from 1916 to 1918, advocating and recruiting for his cause. He wrote a letter to the Ontario minister of education, Robert Allan Pyne, in 1916 urging him to appoint a qualified headmaster for the Ontario School for the Blind. He wrote to Alexander Viets, a veteran and a fellow blind man, who was moving to Toronto. In his letter, he wrote that:

We want a Canadian National Institute badly and we want it NOW. So we are going to get it – soon. I am not paying any attention to obstacles but am starting with our Eastern Provinces and working Westward Ho!

Dickson had made connections with three more blind men; Edwin Baker, Sherman Swift, and Charles Carruthers. The five men would frequently visit each other at Dickson's house at 192 Bloor Street West. All these men were passionate about advancing the rights of blind people in the country, and wanted to make an institution that would further their cause. On 30 March 1918, the five men, plus George Plaxton and Lewis Wood, would receive letters patent formally establishing the Canadian National Institute for the Blind, dedicated to advancing the rights of blind people in Canada. As the eldest of the founders, Dickson was appointed to be the first president of the institution. After Canadian soldiers began returning home from World War I in 1918, Dickson became friends with virtually every blinded soldier.

Although he was one of the original founders of the CNIB, and had a vast network of connections, Dickson's aggressive push and personality led to him having struggles as the president of the CNIB. On 6 August 1918, just 6 months after being appointed, he resigned his position, while recommending Lewis Wood to be the next president. Following his resignation, Dickson was appointed chairman of the CNIB's Blinded Soldier's Committee in December of that year. He served in this position until June 1919, when he resigned citing his failing health. Following his time with the CNIB, he was an inaugural patron and honorary president of the newly established Sir Arthur Pearson Association of War Blinded (SAPA), an association made specifically for the war blinded. A national reunion was held for the blinded veterans of World War I, and Dickson gave the main address of the event, at which he urged the cooperation between blinded soldiers and the CNIB. He continued to attend the annual general meeting of SAPA until his death. At the time of his death, he was the only civilian to be honoured with an official position at SAPA.

== Personal life ==
For his contributions to public health, Dickson was made a lifetime member of the Order of St. John of Jerusalem in 1910. He was also given the King George VI Coronation Medal for his advocacy for the blind in 1937.

Dickson was a member of the Presbyterian Church of Canada. He was also a member of the Royal Canadian Yacht Club, which he was an active member of until a few years before his death. A lifelong bachelor, he died on 9 July 1938 from a malignancy of the bladder and prostate. His funeral costs were covered by the CNIB, and he is buried at Mount Pleasant Cemetery, Toronto. Members of SAPA and medical professionals were in attendance at his funeral on 12 July.
