= 1916 New York City polio epidemic =

Disease outbreak in New York City

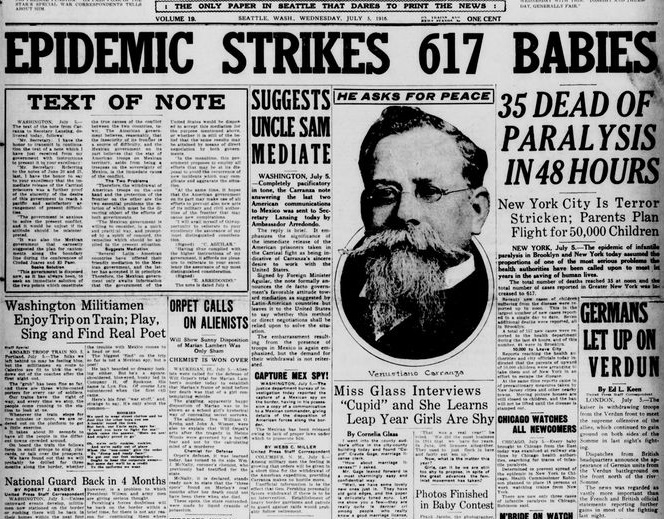
- The Seattle Star July 5, 1916, coverage of the NYC Polio Epidemic
- Disease: Polio
- Location: New York City
- Arrival date: June 1916
- Confirmed cases: Several thousands
- Deaths: over 2,000

The 1916 New York City polio epidemic was an infectious disease epidemic of polio ultimately infecting several thousand people, and killing over two thousand, in New York City, primarily in the borough of Brooklyn. The epidemic was officially announced in June 1916, and a special field force was assembled under the authority of Dr. Simon R. Blatteis of the New York City Health Department's Bureau of Preventable Diseases, with broad authority to quarantine those infected with polio and institute hygiene measures thought to slow the transmission of the disease. Polio was a poorly understood disease in this era, and no polio vaccine existed at this time. Official efforts to stem its spread consisted primarily of quarantines, the closure of public places, and the use of chemical disinfectants to cleanse areas where the disease had been present. Special polio clinics were established at various locations in the city for the treatment and quarantine of patients.

In addition, many informal remedies or preventative measures were tried by the frightened population, while public activities largely fell silent. Ultimately, the epidemic subsided in the winter months, with the cause remaining a mystery to investigators and the public.

== Progress of the epidemic ==
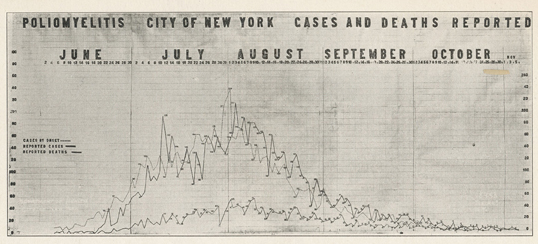
Chart of illnesses and deaths in the 1916 New York polio epidemic.

On Saturday, June 17, 1916, an official announcement of the existence of an epidemic polio infection was made in Brooklyn, New York. Over the course of that year, there were over 27,000 cases and more than 6,000 deaths due to polio in the United States, with over 2,000 deaths in New York City alone.

According to the figures compiled by the New York City Department of Health, by June 1916 there were 114 verified cases of infantile paralysis in Brooklyn, practically all of them in the old South Brooklyn section. The outbreak appeared to be confined to infants and young children, less than 10% of the cases occurring in children over five years of age. The Department of Health stated that a careful investigation had failed to substantiate the view that the schools had a share in spreading the disease, pointing out that over 90% of the children were under the typical school age; that the cases were not limited or even more prevalent in any one school district, and that they were not at all limited to children in the same classroom.

On June 26, 1916, the Department of Health issued a bulletin noting 37 additional cases of infantile paralysis reported to the Department of Health making a total to date of 183 cases in Brooklyn. A study of the situation indicated that the disease was spreading in a southerly direction and was invading the Parkville section, to the east of Bay Ridge, Brooklyn. In the week preceding that report, 12 deaths were reported from anterior poliomyelitis (infantile paralysis) in the Greater City, eleven occurring in Brooklyn, almost as many as occurred in the entire city during the year 1915, when 13 deaths from this disease were reported for the entire year in the Greater City. The twelfth case was reported to the Department from Staten Island. It was located in an Italian-American district, like most of the Brooklyn cases.

On June 28, 1916, another 23 cases were reported, bringing the total in Brooklyn to 206 cases. On July 1, 1916, 53 new cases and 12 deaths were reported in New York City, making a total of 59 deaths since the outbreak of the epidemic. Both illnesses and deaths thereafter continued to increase on a daily basis throughout the month of July, peaking in early August, by which time the total number of cases was in the tens of thousands, and the number of deaths was over one thousand. The disease then began a slow decline for much of the remainder of the year.

The height of the epidemic lasted from June to November. Once cases began to subside, businesses reopened, and the public fear decreased. The overall mortality rate throughout the city was estimated to be about 25%, and the disease left many more paralyzed. Moreover, caring for paralyzed children after they left the hospital became the focus by the end of the epidemic. The Rockefeller Foundation helped create a special committee that allocated 75,000 dollars to care for 2000 disabled children each year.

The people affected by polio usually experienced quick deaths. Researchers found in a study concentrated on 1,325 fatal cases (14.5% of the total), 82% died within the first week of having polio, 11% died in the second week, and 3% in the third week. Since the disease took its course so quickly, it was complicated for medical professionals to control the situation, especially since there was no modern medicine to treat polio once infected.

=== Demographics of the epidemic ===
The polio epidemic in 1916 swiftly made its way through New York City. Overall, there were 9,131 cases throughout the city which had a total population of 5,278,782. The total attack rate for polio on the entire population was 0.17%. However, the ages significantly impacted by the epidemic and considered the highest risk group were children one to three years old. For this age group, there were 5,370 cases which means they made up almost 60% of the total cases in the city. Furthermore, the attack rate on this group was 1.6%. Two-year-olds had the highest attack rate per 100,000 people at 1.84%. Additionally, the death rate was very high, particularly for the younger age groups. At the height of the epidemic, which was from June 1 to November 1, the death rate from polio in the greater New York City area was 26.9%. Out of all the deaths from polio during this span, 83% of them were of children under 5 years of age, while only 2.5% of the deaths were of people over the age of 16.

Unlike other epidemics and outbreaks, New York City saw its most significant number of proportional cases in less populated boroughs such as Staten Island and Queens. Densely populated boroughs such as Manhattan and Brooklyn saw fewer cases in 1916 which confused many researchers. Staten Island was the most interesting case because of its geographical difference from the other boroughs. It was very suburban, and there were as low as two people per acre in the county as opposed to the urbanized boroughs such as Manhattan, which had about 170 people per acre. The most puzzling statistic was that Staten Island also had the highest percentage of children over the ages of 5 out of any other borough, which was contradictory to the studies that showed this specific age group had the highest attack rate. Researchers at the time did not fully understand why polio had a greater impact on Staten Island than any other borough. However, the information known today suggests that the immigrant communities in Manhattan and Brooklyn were more cautious with the disease. Also, the immigrant families benefited from the city's sanitation department prioritizing the hygiene of their neighborhoods, considering that they were thought to be the epicenter as opposed to the native communities in Staten Island.

== Responses ==
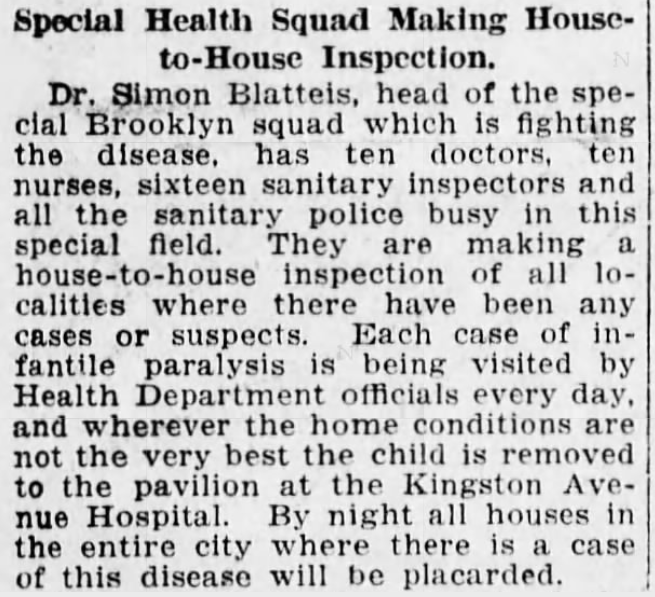
Newspaper article outlining steps being taken to combat the pandemic

The 1916 epidemic caused widespread panic and thousands fled the city to nearby mountain resorts. A number of social distancing initiatives were put in place to contain the outbreak; movie theaters were closed, meetings were canceled, public gatherings were almost nonexistent, and children were warned not to drink from water fountains, and told to avoid amusement parks, swimming pools, and beaches. The names and addresses of individuals with confirmed polio cases were published daily in the press, their houses were identified with placards, and their families were quarantined. Cities in neighboring counties and states enacted rules barring New Yorkers from entering those cities, with Hoboken, New Jersey going so far as to have police officers intercept travelers arriving from Brooklyn by ferry and escort them back to Brooklyn. Hiram M. Hiller Jr. was one of the physicians in several cities who realized what they were dealing with, but the nature of the disease remained largely a mystery. In the absence of proven treatments, a number of odd and potentially dangerous polio treatments were suggested. In John Haven Emerson's A Monograph on the Epidemic of Poliomyelitis (Infantile Paralysis) in New York City in 1916, one suggested remedy reads:

Give oxygen through the lower extremities, by positive electricity. Frequent baths using almond meal, or oxidising the water. Applications of poultices of Roman chamomile, slippery elm, arnica, mustard, cantharis, amygdalae dulcis oil, and of special merit, spikenard oil and Xanthoxolinum. Internally use caffeine, Fl. Kola, dry muriate of quinine, elixir of cinchone, radium water, chloride of gold, liquor calcis and wine of pepsin.

Because of the relation alleged to exist between polio and the stable fly, a survey was made to determine whether the cases were in the vicinity of stables, and the Sanitary Bureau took special pains to see that the manure in all of the stables in the affected districts was properly disposed of to prevent the breeding of flies.

In response to a call issued by Commissioner Emerson, a conference of experts was held at the Health Department on June 28, 1916, to discuss plans for the control of infantile paralysis in Brooklyn. At the conference it was decided to organize a special field force in Brooklyn under Simon R. Blatteis of the Department's Bureau of Preventable Diseases. A special staff of medical inspectors, sanitary inspectors, nurses, and sanitary police, would assist Blatteis, visiting all cases daily and see that strict quarantine was maintained, and that all the premises where a case of infantile paralysis exists were placarded. The Department of Health prepared a special pavilion at its Kingston Avenue Hospital for people with infantile paralysis to be cared for by skilled specialists. The department organized a special visiting staff of experts, including specialists in children's diseases, orthopedists and neurologists, to assist the regular attending staff. The Health Department insisted that a patient, in order to be allowed to remain at home, should have a separate room, separate toilet, a special person in attendance for nursing purposes, and facilities for the proper disposal of all discharges. Where these facilities could not be provided, the Health Department would hospitalize the patient at no charge. By July 8, 1916, Blatteis had established six clinics in Brooklyn specifically set up to receive polio victims.

The Health Commissioner ordered that all children under the age of 16 be prohibited from areas of public gatherings such as movie theaters and playgrounds and highly advised them to remain at home. In June, the Board of Health increased the isolation period for infected Polio patients from six to eight weeks. The quarantine was very challenging for parents and children, especially those who lived in crowded tenement apartments. Patrolmen were sent to the homes of those in quarantine every other day to ensure families followed protocols. On August 25, the New York Journal reported that one woman had her nephew forcibly taken away in Brooklyn. The police raided her house to obtain the child suspected of having Polio. Additionally, the city used 4 million gallons of water to clean the streets. Dr. Emerson ordered garbage to be collected more frequently, parents to bathe their children more often, and for people to ameliorate their plumbing system. The city's government issued a mandate not allowing children to leave New York City unless given special permission to do so. Furthermore, the police guarded every entrance to the city, and not a single person was allowed to enter during this time.

The Department of Health considered animals to be carriers and spreaders of Polio. Even though this turned out to be false, thousands of animals were euthanized out of fear. The New York Times reported that 300 to 450 animals were being killed each day, and 72,000 cats were slaughtered as of July 26. More theories continued to circulate among the population of how Polio came to be. For example, people believed that contaminated sharks brought germs to America due to the toxic air they inhaled in Europe during the war. Others suspected the cause was permeated by automobile exhausts, sewers, garbage, and other animals and insects. The Department of Health considered these hypotheses but could not find sufficient evidence pointing to these suspicions to be the cause.

=== Discrimination ===
Certain groups of people, such as impoverished and newer immigrants, were scapegoated during the epidemic. However, the truth turned out to be the contrary. During this time, many people from different countries across Europe were immigrating to the United States. New York was a trendy place for these immigrants to settle in. The social hierarchy was the native-born people or White Anglo-Saxon Protestants were at the top of the food chain, followed by the Irish and Germans who were considered established immigrants. The people deemed inferior were the Polish, Russian, and Italian immigrants who held the reputation of lacking hygiene and living in overcrowded and dirty areas. Dr. Emerson, the city commissioner of health, assumed that the epicenter of cases was due to overcrowded housing of these immigrant groups who primarily lived in lower Manhattan and Brooklyn. The New York Times reported that Italian immigrants had brought the disease to America, even though no record of cases passed through Ellis Island. The claim was not accurate as studies displayed that Staten Island, which had the lowest foreign-born population out of all the boroughs, had the highest proportion of cases. Additionally, more of the cases among children stemmed from native-born or established immigrant groups. It was determined that the overlooked immigrants had lower mortality rates from polio as opposed to children from the standard American family. A study found that over 60% of the cases in children were from native-born families.

Black Americans were also a target of discrimination during the epidemic. Like the white immigrant groups, people assumed that African Americans were one of the primary spreaders of Polio because they tended to be lower-skilled labor workers and lived in crowded and dilapidated communities. The Health Department's previous statement about the epicenter of the disease fueled hatred towards this group. However, the city's Health Department stated that black children were less susceptible to Polio than white children. They also determined that blonde-haired people were more likely than brown-haired people to be infected, which supported the evidence that the native-born people who tended to be White Anglo-Saxon Protestants had the highest infection rates out of all the groups.

=== Public reaction ===
The immediate reaction as Polio spread throughout the city from the public was fear, especially from parents who had young children. The media pleaded for parents not to let their children participate in public gatherings, leading to the more extensive shutdown of many movie theaters, parks, and more. On July 4, The New York Times published a fear-mongering headline that read, "Bar All Children from the Movies in Paralysis War... 72 New Cases in the City Twenty-Three Deaths Occurred Here Yesterday." Many mothers refused to send their children to hospitals because they assumed their children would be placed on their death beds instead of receiving sufficient treatment that could potentially prevent disability. The mothers thoroughly believed they would do a better job caring for their child if they contracted Polio increasing their chances of survival. Not only were they fearful of letting their children out of the house, but mothers also took very extreme measures to combat Polio, such as stuffing the cracks of windows with rags to prevent the disease from getting in. These unhealthy measures put infants at higher risk and created other issues such as overheating. Children dripped in their sweat in the dog days of summer. Families were worried to the point that they shipped their children out of New York City in mass numbers. On July 5, the New York Times estimated that 50,000 children were sent away where their parents felt that they would be the safest. here were other instances of fear as protocols set by the city's government became stricter. A Flatbush, Brooklyn nurse who worked for the public school district reported to the police that she received a letter from parents threatening her life if she continued to report their children to the Board of Health over suspicion of Polio.

== See also ==
- History of public health in New York City
- List of disasters in New York City by death toll

== Further reading. ==
- Meyers, Keith, and Melissa A. Thomasson. "Can pandemics affect educational attainment? Evidence from the polio epidemic of 1916." Cliometrica 15.2 (2021): 231-265. online.
- Oshinsky, David M. Polio: an American story (Oxford University Press, 2005) online.
- Risse, Guenter B. "Revolt against quarantine: community responses to the 1916 polio epidemic, Oyster Bay, New York." Transactions & Studies of the College of Physicians of Philadelphia 14.1 (1992): 23-50. online.
- Rogers, Naomi. “A Disease of Cleanliness: Polio in New York City, 1900–1990,” in Hives of Sickness: Public Health and Epidemics in New York City, ed. David Rosner (Rutgers University Press, 1995), pp. 115–30.
- Rogers, Naomi. Dirt and Disease: Polio Before FDR (1992).
- Rogers, Naomi. "Dirt, Flies and Immigrants: Explaining the Epidemiology of Poliomyelitis, 1900–1916", in Sickness and Health in America, ed. Judith Walter and Ronald Numbers (1997).
- Wyatt, H. V. "The 1916 New York City Epidemic of Poliomyelitis: Where did the Virus Come From?." The Open Vaccine Journal 4.1 (2011): 13-17. Online.

=== Primary sources ===
- Bolduan, Charles F. "What we have learned from the New York epidemic of poliomyelitis." American Journal of Public Health 7.1 (1917): 86-90. online.
- Herrman, Charles. "The age and seasonal incidence and communicability of acute poliomyelitis: as SHOWN IN the epidemic in New York city in 1916." Journal of the American Medical Association 69.3 (1917): 163-166. online.
- Lavinder, Claude Hervey, Allen Weir Freeman, and Wade Hampton Frost. Epidemiologic studies of poliomyelitis in New York City and the northeastern United States during the year 1916. No. 91 (US Government Printing Office, 1918) online.
- New York Department of Health. A Monograph on the Epidemic of Poliomyelitis (Infantile Paralysis) in New York City in 1916: based on the Official Reports of the Bureaus of the Department of Health. No. 16 (1917) online.
