= William N. Rom =

Sol and Judith Professor of Medicine and Environmental Medicine

William N Rom
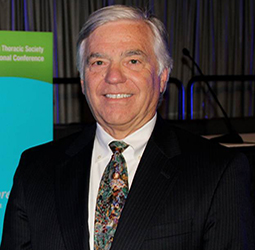
- Born: San Francisco, California
- Education: University of Colorado (BA); University of Minnesota School of Medicine (BS)(MD); Harvard T.H. Chan School of Public Health (MPH)
- Spouse: Holly Meeker Rom
- Children: two
- Awards: Harvard School of Public Health Alumni Award of Merit (2011); American Thoracic Society Distinguished Achievement Award; White House Champion of Climate Change
- Scientific career
- Workplaces: New York University School of Medicine
- Website: wagner.nyu.edu/community/faculty/william-rom

William N. Rom is the Global Distinguished Professor of Environmental Health at NYU School of Global Public Health. He is also the Sol and Judith Bergstein Professor of Medicine and Environmental Medicine, Emeritus at New York University Grossman School of Medicine and former Director of the Division of Pulmonary, Critical Care and Sleep Medicine at New York University and Chief of the Chest Service at Bellevue Hospital Center, 1989–2014.

== Education and career ==
William N. Rom received a BA cum laude in Political Science from the University of Colorado (The West's Conservation Controversy 1901–1908), his BS, MD in Medicine from the University of Minnesota School of Medicine, and MPH in Environmental and Occupational Health from Harvard T.H. Chan School of Public Health in 1973. He did his residency in Internal Medicine at the University Of California, Davis and Sacramento Medical Center and fellowship with Drs. Irving J. Selikoff and Alvin Teirstein in Pulmonary and Occupational Medicine at Mt. Sinai in New York.

He worked as Assistant and Associate Professor at the Pulmonary and Critical Care Division at the University of Utah School of Medicine and was Founder/Director of the Rocky Mountain Center for Occupational and Environmental Health., He was an adjunct in Immunology at Rockefeller University, and taught Pulmonary Medicine at the University of Addis Ababa, and at Bishkek, Kyrgyzstan. He was a Senior Investigator at Pulmonary Branch, National Heart Lung and Blood Institute (NHLBI), NIH (1983–1989). William N. Rom spoke at the Selke Hearings with Sigurd Olson in Ely, MN in 1964 against clear-cut logging, and chaired a Symposium on protecting the Boundary Waters Canoe Area at the University of Minnesota on inaugural Earth Day, April 22, 1970. He was a wilderness canoe guide in the Boundary Waters Canoe Area Wilderness and Quetico Provincial Park and canoed the Albany, Churchill, South Nahanni, Back and Allagash Rivers. ref William N Rom MD, Canoe Country Wilderness, Voyageur Press, 1987.

== Research ==
=== Environmental Lung Disease ===
William N. Rom began environmental lung disease research at Mt. Sinai studying asbestos-exposed workers and household contacts, and farmers exposed to polybrominated biphenyls. Rom studied coal miners, dental laboratory workers, trona miners, oil shale workers, and copper smelter workers at the University of Utah.

At the NIH, Rom studied workers exposed to asbestos, silica, or coal to elucidate the mechanisms of fibrosis by measuring growth factors released by alveolar macrophages obtained by bronchoalveolar lavage. He identified and purified the macrophage insulin-like I molecule. He led an expedition to India to study the chronic effects of Tropical Pulmonary Eosinophilia.

=== Host Response to Tuberculosis and AIDS ===
While at NYU/Bellevue, Rom focused research on the translational molecular mechanisms of the host response to tuberculosis. With Dr. Neil Schluger, he built the first hospital-based directly observed therapy program funded by the Robert Wood Johnson Foundation. He pioneered nuclear acid amplification for the detection of tuberculosis in the sputum and blood. He introduced bronchoalveolar lavage in TB patients and developed the concept of comparing BAL in the involved to the uninvolved lung. He characterized the lymphocytes in TB inflammation. He showed that TB mycobacteria induced alveolar macrophages to secrete cytokines that directed transcription factors to stimulate high-level HIV replication in TB-infected areas of the lung. In South Africa, he showed that aerosolized interferon-gamma could accelerate sputum clearance of TB mycobacteria from the sputum.

=== Lung Cancer ===
William N. Rom designed a lung-specific dominant negative p53 transgenic mouse that spontaneously developed adenocarcinoma of the lung over 9 months, and after intratracheal benzo(a)pyrene could synergize in causing lung cancer demonstrating gene-environment interaction. Rom founded and directed the NYU Lung Cancer Biomarker Center that was part of the NCI Early Detection Research Network (2001–2015). His findings in collaborative studies for early detection of lung cancer focused on networks of immune response, metabolism, growth factors and receptors, signaling pathways, cytokines, and altered methylation biomarkers.

=== World Trade Center Lung Disease ===
Rom described acute eosinophilic pneumonia in a New York City firefighter heavily exposed to World Trade Center (WTC) dust and illustrated WTC dust in BAL cells using scanning transmission electron microscopy. He and colleagues described World Trade Center cough and breathlessness. He described the use of oscillometry to decipher the silent zone of the small airways' inflammation due to WTC dust in the presence of normal spirometry yet persistent respiratory symptoms. He served on the World Trade Center Health Program Scientific/Technical Advisory Committee of NIOSH.

=== Climate Change and Global Public Health ===
William N. Rom staffed Senator Hillary Rodham Clinton on the floor of the U.S. Senate October 2003 in the debate in favor of the McCain-Lieberman Cap-and-Trade bill. He is co-editor with Kent Pinkerton PhD of Global Climate Change and Public Health Second Edition New York: Humana Press, 2021, (29 chapters). He has taught Climate Change and Environmental Health at NYU School of Global Public Health since 2015.

== Awards and honors ==
- Harriet Hardy Award for Excellence in Occupational Medicine by New England Occupational Medicine Association (1992)
- NCI Early Detection Research Network Award for Providing Creative, Outstanding Leadership in Building a Strong, Effective Translational *Research Program on the Application of Biomarkers in Cancer Detection and Prevention (2007) (2009)
- Robert Kehoe Award, American College of Occupational and Environmental Medicine (2012)
- Murray Kornfeld Honor Lecture "Global TB/HIV and The Environment" American College of Chest Physicians (2013)
- Distinguished Achievement Award, American Thoracic Society (2014)
- He was elected to the Association of American Physicians in 1999 and was inducted as a Fellow by the American Association for the Advancement of Science in 2015.

William N. Rom received the Val Vallyathan Award from the American Thoracic Society Assembly on Environmental, Occupational, and Population Health in 2015. He received an Alumni Award of Merit from Harvard School of Public Health in 2011 and the Champion of Change Award from the White House in 2013 for his work on Climate Change.

The William N. Rom Environmental Lung Disease Laboratory at NYU/Bellevue Hospital for research on World Trade Center dust was named in his honor. In addition, The William N. Rom and David Kamelhar Associate Professor of Medicine was endowed jointly in his honor.

== Other activities ==
William N. Rom is a Fellow (1992) in The Explorer's Club, where he has been awarded five Flag expeditions: First, climbing Bob Marshall's mountain (Bob Marshall was a Founder of The Wilderness Society), Mount Doonerak, in the Brooks Range of Alaska. Second, the first Westerners to climb Mt. Geladaintong 21,730 feet, the source of the Yangtze River in the Kun Lun Range in northern Tibet. Third, crossings the island of South Georgia in the Antarctic along Sir Ernest Shackleton's route and Fourth, travelling with the Thule Inuit by dogsled in northern Greenland to obtain eyewitness accounts of the effects of global warming. He joined Ron Bayens and Bob Wade in paddling the Winisk River to Hudson Bay. Explorers Journal

He was the founder and chair of the ATS Environmental Health Policy Committee and has testified numerous times to Congress, CASAC, and the EPA Administrator on PM_{2.5} and ozone.

== Publications ==
Some selected publications are:

- Showe, Louise C.; Showe, Michael K.; Rom, William N.; Nam, Brian; Bauer, Thomas; Vachani, Anil; Yendamuri, Sai; Pass, Harvey; Tsay, Jun-Chieh J. (2018-11-28). "A Gene Expression Classifier from Whole Blood Distinguishes Benign from Malignant Lung Nodules Detected by Low-Dose CT". Cancer Research. 79 (1): 263–273. doi:10.1158/0008-5472.CAN-18-2032. ISSN 0008-5472. PMC 6317999. PMID 30487137.
- Tsay, Jun-Chieh J.; Wu, Benjamin G.; Badri, Michelle H.; Clemente, Jose C.; Shen, Nan; Meyn, Peter; Li, Yonghua; Yie, Ting-An; Lhakhang, Tenzin (2018-06-04). "Airway Microbiota Is Associated with Upregulation of the PI3K Pathway in Lung Cancer". American Journal of Respiratory and Critical Care Medicine. 198 (9): 1188–1198. doi:10.1164/rccm.201710-2118OC. ISSN 1073-449X. PMC 6221574. PMID 29864375.
- Dai, Liping; Li, Jitian; Tsay, Jun-Chieh J.; Yie, Ting-An; Munger, John S.; Pass, Harvey; Rom, William N.; Tan, Eng M.; Zhang, Jian-Ying (2017). "Identification of autoantibodies to ECH1 and HNRNPA2B1 as potential biomarkers in the early detection of lung cancer". Oncoimmunology. 6 (5) e1310359. doi:10.1080/2162402X.2017.1310359. ISSN 2162-4011. PMC 5467997. PMID 28638733.

=== Books ===
- Rom, William N. (1980). Health implications of new energy technologies. Ann Arbor, Michigan: Ann Arbor Science Publishers. ISBN 978-0-250-40361-5.
- Rom, William N.; Markowitz, Steven B. (2007). Environmental and Occupational Medicine. Lippincott Williams & Wilkins. ISBN 978-0-7817-6299-1. (1st Edition 1983; 2nd Edition 1992; 3rd Edition 1998; 4th Edition 2007).)
- Rom, William N. (May 1990). Canoe Country Wilderness, Minneapolis, MN: Voyageur Press, 1987. Voyageur Press. ISBN 0-89658-065-2.

Rom WN and Garay S. (Editors). Tuberculosis, Boston, MA: Little, Brown and Co, 1996 (1st Edition; 2nd Edition 1994). "Environmental Policy and Public Health: Air Pollution, Global Climate Change, and Wilderness. Jossey-Bass (Wiley), San Francisco, CA, 2011". wiley.com. Pinkerton KE and Rom WN, Editors, Global Climate Change and Public Health, New York, NY: Springer-Humana Press, 2013 (1st Edition, 2nd Edition 2021).
