= George Grunberger =

Czech-American endocrinologist (born 1950)

- Born: Jiří Grunberger; 1950 (age 75–76); Prague, Czechoslovakia
- Education: Columbia College of Columbia University (BA); New York University School of Medicine (MD); Case Western Reserve University
- Occupation: Endocrinologist

George Grunberger (born Jiří Grunberger; 1950) is a Czech-born American endocrinologist, specializing in diabetes. He has been elected as a Fellow of the American College of Physicians (FACP) in 1989, a Fellow of the American College of Endocrinology (FACE) in 2000, and a Master of the American College of Endocrinology (MACE) in 2020.

== Biography ==
Grunberger was born in 1950 in Prague, then in Czechoslovakia. He received his medical degree in 1977 from the New York University School of Medicine, and subsequently fulfilled internal medicine training requirements in 1980 while at Case Western Reserve University in Cleveland, Ohio. He became a specialist of endocrinology and metabolism in 1986, at the National Institutes of Health Diabetes Branch in Bethesda, Maryland.

He has published fairly extensively since 1973 on the topic of diabetes. In 1988, during a study concerning diabetes, Grunberger and his colleagues found that "in a rat model of IDDM in which insulin concentrations are very low, the number of insulin receptors on the surface of the liver was elevated", suggesting that "when insulin secretion is diminished, an unknown mechanism regulates cell surface receptors to that increase their density in order to enhance sensitivity to scarce insulin".

In 1992, he was the head of the Diabetes Service in Wayne State University.
