= 1906 Tonsil Riots =

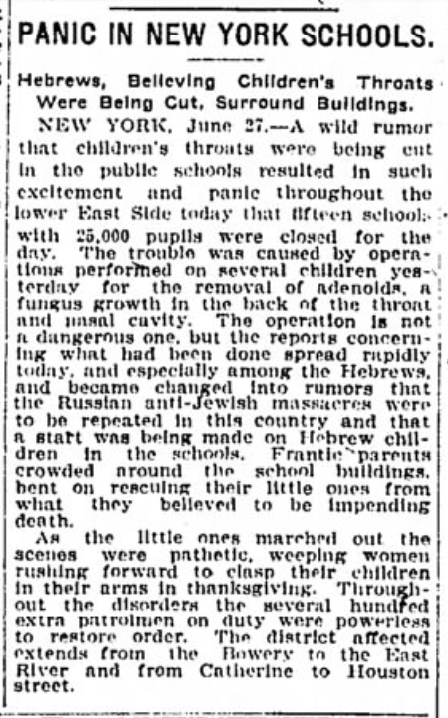
"Panic in New York Schools", Indianapolis Star (28 June 1906, p. 4)

The "tonsil riots" of 1906 (also known as the tonsillectomy riots) were public health panics that took place on June 27, 1906, in New York City, concentrated in neighborhoods dominated by Jewish immigrants, that centered on the actions of Board of Health physicians who performed tonsillectomies and adenoidectomies on students at several public schools. The rioters were mostly Jewish mothers who were disturbed by the sight of their children returning home from school exuding blood from the surgeries.

In the course of the riot, groups of Jewish women fought—verbally and physically—school principals, police, and those suspected to be officials of the Board of Health.
