= Regina Sullivan =

American neuroscientist

- Education: Brooklyn College (B.S.) CUNY Graduate Center (Ph.D.)
- Awards: University Oklahoma Presidential Professor Sigma Xi Faculty Research Award; Christopher Clavius Research Award; Fellow of the Eastern Psychological Association NICHD MERIT award
- Scientific career
- Fields: Professor of Child and Adolescent Psychiatry Senior Research Scientist

Regina Sullivan is an American developmental behavioral neuroscientist, a professor of child and adolescent psychiatry at the New York University School of Medicine and senior research scientist in the Emotional Brain Institute at The Nathan Kline Institute for Psychiatric Research.

== Life and work ==
Sullivan's work focuses on the neurobiology of mother-infant interactions and early life adversity in rodents and humans, and their relationship to life-long psychopathology. Her work brings a diverse set of research tools to these questions including behavior, neuroanatomy, pharmacology, functional imaging, electrophysiology and optogenetics in infant rodents.

She has been very active in promoting the advancement of women and minorities in the subjects of Science, technology, engineering, and mathematics throughout her career.

== Education and positions ==
Sullivan received her Bachelor of Science degree in Experimental Psychology from Brooklyn College of the City University of New York. She then received her Doctor of Philosophy in Biopsychology from the Graduate Center if the City University of New York. After a short post-doctoral position at Duke University, she moved to the University of California, Irvine for additional post-doctoral training with Dr. Michael Leon. There she rose to the position of assistant research professor in the department of psychobiology (now neurobiology and behavior).

Following her training, she was hired as an assistant professor of psychology at the University of Oklahoma, where she earned tenure and promotion to associate professor. She then transferred to the Department of Zoology (now Biology) where she became a full professor and was subsequently honored as a presidential professor. In 2008, she moved to New York City, her hometown, where she now serves as a tenured professor of child and adolescent psychiatry at the New York University School of Medicine and senior research scientist in the Emotional Brain Institute at The Nathan Kline Institute for Psychiatric Research.

Sullivan holds adjunct or affiliated positions at the New York University Center for Neural Science, the University of Oklahoma Biology department, and the Karolinska Institute. In addition she has held a variety of international visiting academic appointments including at the Université Claude Bernard, Lyon France, Kochi Medical School, Kochi Japan and the Université de Paris in France.

== Research program ==
Sullivan’s work has focused on the neurobiology of infant attachment to the mother and the multisensory cues the mother/caregiver provides to the infant to initiate and maintain that attachment. Her early work dissected how maternal odor cues became associated with warmth, tactile stimulation, and milk to drive a learned attraction by the infant (rodent or human) toward the caregiver. Such an attraction is critical for survival of altricial mammals like humans and many rodent infants. In addition to promoting attraction to the caregiver, these cues can also serve to modulate infant behavioral state. For example, cues from the caregiver can soothe an infant, prepare them for feeding, and reduce fear. However, Sullivan has demonstrated that adverse caregiving during early development can disrupt this caregiver modulation of infant, and lead to long lasting consequences such as impaired social behavior, depression-like symptoms and modified fear learning. These changes in behavior evoked by adverse rearing are mediated by the amygdala and changes in its dopaminergic inputs. Her work has been continuously funded by NIH and/or NSF.

== Awards and distinctions ==
Sullivan has received numerous honors (e.g., Univ. Oklahoma Presidential Professor, Sigma Xi Faculty Research Award, Christopher Clavius Research Award, Fellow of the Eastern Psychological Association, NICHD MERIT award), elected positions (such as president of the International Society for Developmental Psychobiology), and served on multiple committees at NIH and editorial boards.

== Publications ==
- Sullivan, RM; Landers, M; Yeaman, B; Wilson, DA (2000). "Good memories of bad events in infancy: Ontogeny of conditioned fear and the amygdala". Nature. 407: 38–39. doi:10.1038/35024156. PMC 9196994. PMID 10993064.
- Moriceau, S; Sullivan, RM (2006). "Maternal presence serves as a switch between attraction and fear in infancy". Nature Neuroscience. 9: 1004–1006. doi:10.1038/nn1733. PMC 1560090. PMID 16829957.
- Barr, G; Moriceau, S; Shionoya, K; Muzny, K; Gao, P; Sullivan, RM (2009). "Transitions in infant attachment during a sensitive period is modulated by dopamine in the amygdala". Nature Neuroscience. 12: 1367–1369. doi:10.1038/nn.2403. PMC 2783302. PMID 19783994.
- Karpova, N; Pickenhagen, A; Lindholm, J; TiraboschiE, Kulesskaya N; Ágústsdóttir, A; Antila, H; Popova, D; AkamineY, Bahi A; Sullivan, RM; Hen, R; Drew, L; Castren, R (2011). "Synergy between antidepressant drug treatment and psychological therapy is required for fear erasure in amygdala". Science. 334: 1731–1734. doi:10.1126/science.1214592. PMC 3929964. PMID 22194582.
- Hostinar, CE; Sullivan, RM; Gunnar, MR (2014). "Psychobiological mechanisms underlying the social buffering of the Hypothalamic–Pituitary–Adrenocortical Axis: A review of animal models and human studies across development". Psychological Bulletin. 140 (1): 256–282. doi:10.1037/a0032671. PMC 3844011. PMID 23607429.
- Tottenham, N; Shapiro, M; Flannery, J; Caldera, C; Sullivan, RM (2019). "Parental presence switches avoidance to attraction learning in children". Nature Human Behaviour. 3 (10): 1070–1077. doi:10.1038/s41562-019-0656-9. PMC 7218758. PMID 31332302.
- Perry, RE; Finegood, ED; Braren, SH; Dejoseph, ML; Putrino, DF; Wilson, DA; Sullivan, RM; Raver, CC; Blair, C (2019). "Developing a neurobehavioral animal model of poverty: Drawing cross-species connections between environments of scarcity-adversity, parenting quality, and infant outcome". Dev Psychopathol. 31: 399–418. doi:10.1017/S095457941800007X. PMC 6168440. PMID 29606185.
- Opendak, M; Theisen, E; Blomkvist, A; Hollis, K; Lind, T; Sarro, E; Lundström, JN; Tottenham, N; Dozier, M; Wilson, DA; Sullivan, RM (2020). "Adverse caregiving in infancy blunts neural processing of the mother". Nat Commun. 11: 1119. doi:10.1038/s41467-020-14801-3. PMC 7048726. PMID 32111822.
- Sullivan, RM; Opendak, M (2021). "Neurobiology of infant fear and anxiety: Impacts of delayed amygdala development and attachment figure quality". Biological Psychiatry. 89 (7): 641–650. doi:10.1016/j.biopsych.2020.08.020. PMC 7914291. PMID 33109337.
- Full Publication List
