= Edith Lincoln =

American physician (1899–1971)

Edith M. Lincoln (born Edith Maas; 1899–1971) was an American physician.

Lincoln received her medical degree from Johns Hopkins Medical School and was one of the first women interns at Bellevue Hospital. She founded the pediatric pulmonology unit at Bellevue in 1922, specializing in the treatment of tuberculosis, and led the unit until 1956. She conducted "one of the largest medical studies of that era" on approximately 3000 young tuberculosis patients from admission to age 25. Her findings included that younger children were more likely to die, that poorer children were more likely to get the disease in the first place, and that combining streptomycin with other antibiotics led to improved outcomes. She additionally helped establish isoniazid as a chemoprophylactic agent preventing the development of tuberculous meningitis in children with tuberculosis infection.

She also served as a professor of pediatrics at the New York University School of Medicine from 1950, retiring in 1956.

Lincoln received the Elizabeth Blackwell Award in 1951 and the Trudeau Medal of the National Tuberculosis Association in 1959. She co-authored with Edward Sewell a 1963 book called Tuberculosis in Children, considered a seminal text in the field.

== Sources ==
- Oshinsky, David (2016). Bellevue: three centuries of medicine and mayhem at America's most storied hospital. Doubleday. ISBN 978-0385523363.
