= CNIB Foundation =

Organization for the blind based in Canada

- Fondation INCA
- Logo since 2018

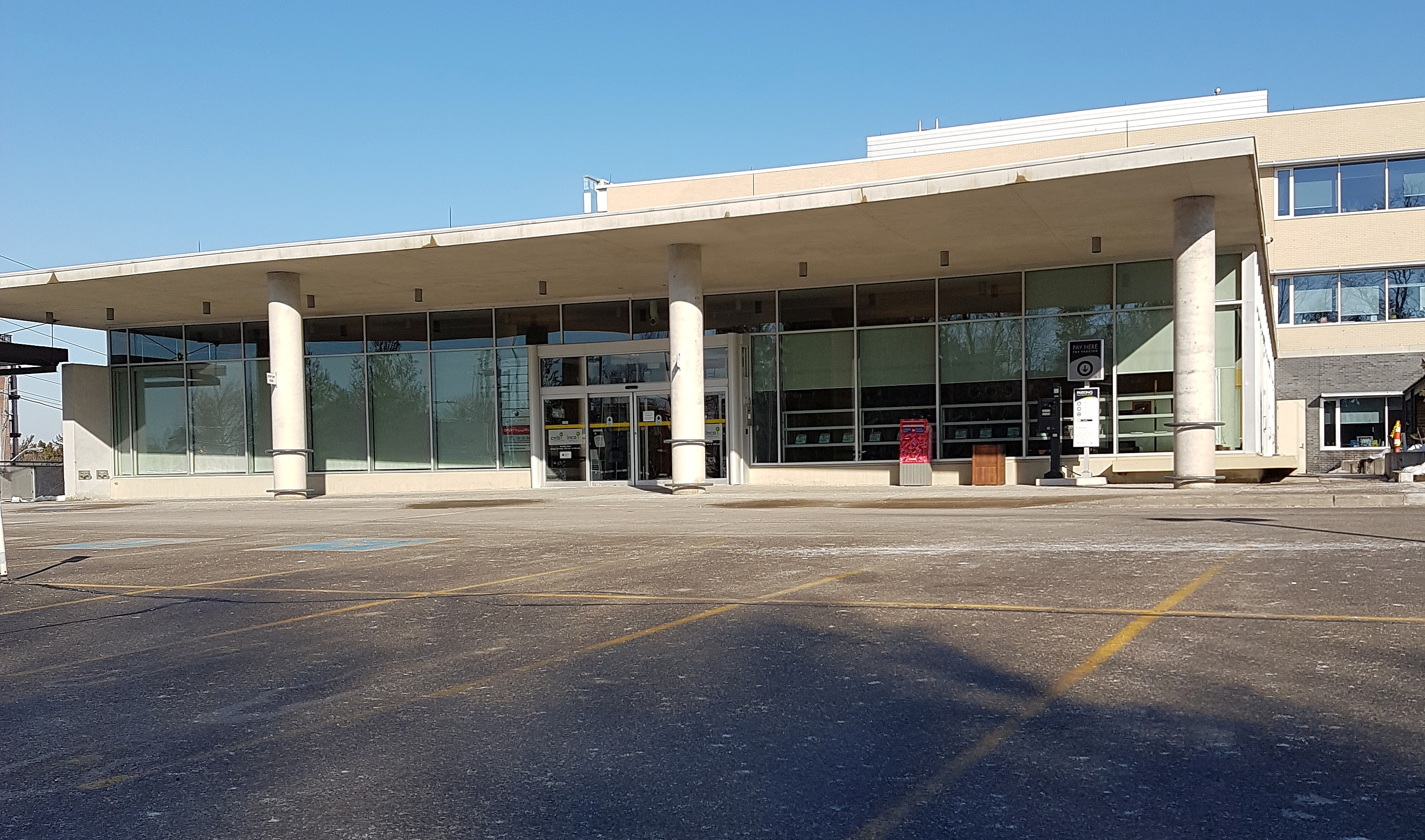
- CNIB headquarters in Toronto
- Formation: March 30, 1918; 108 years ago
- Type: Charitable organization
- Registration no.: 119219459RR0003
- Headquarters: 1929 Bayview Avenue, Toronto, Ontario, Canada
- Coordinates: 43°43′4.55″N 79°22′39.67″W
- Staff: 1,100
- Volunteers: 10,000
- Website: cnib.ca
- Formerly called: Canadian National Institute for the Blind (1918–2010); CNIB (2010–2018)

The CNIB Foundation (French: Fondation INCA) is a Canadian charitable organization and volunteer agency dedicated to assisting Canadians who are blind or living with vision loss, and to provide information about vision health for all Canadians. Founded in 1918 as the Canadian National Institute for the Blind (French: Institut national canadien pour les aveugles) to assist soldiers who had been blinded in the First World War, CNIB originally offered sheltered care and specialized employment to people with vision loss. It has since expanded to include other programs and services, including research, public education, rehabilitation counselling and training, advocacy and an alternative-format library for people living with a print disability. It is a member of the Braille Authority of North America.

== History ==
Former CNIB logo

The Canadian National Institute for the Blind was incorporated on March 30, 1918, to provide food, clothing and sheltered residences for blind veterans returning from World War I as well as the 850 people blinded by the Halifax Explosion in 1917, the largest mass blinding in Canadian history. Among its founders was Dr. Charles Rea Dickson and Edwin Baker. It began with 27 employees serving 1,521 people who were blind, primarily in Toronto, with two "home teachers" providing rehabilitation training in other parts of Canada.

During the 1920s, CNIB operated a job placement program with limited success, also creating jobs through its own factories, broom shops and concession stands. The organization also appointed a special nurse responsible for vision health and sight preservation.

In 1923, a Dominion Charter was obtained to establish a Home Nursery Hospital and Kindergarten for the Blind under 6 years of age in Ottawa. Mothers of blind babies from any Province in the Dominion, were encouraged to place their charges in the Canadian Blind Babies Home Association for proper care and education c. 1918–1939. It was to be similar to "Sunshine Home," at Chorley Wood, England, which was then "the only home in the Empire for Blind babies." After the founder, Mrs. Margaret Dean, died, it went out of existence and the subscription funds were reallocated to CNIB.

By the 1950s, CNIB was serving more than 17,000 clients, with offices, vocational centres and residences in major Canadian cities. A formalized research program into prevention was also prioritized. Steps were taken towards advocacy with the 1930 Blind Voters Act, allowing a person who is blind to vote with the assistance of a sighted person, and legislation around mandatory eye drops to prevent disease in newborns. In 1956, the organization helped sponsor a course for blind computer programmers.

In 2010, the organisation officially changed its name to simply "CNIB" after a national consultation with its membership, branding support from Pilot PMR and creative by Cossette, Inc. In 2018 the organisation rebranded again as the CNIB Foundation.

== Services ==
CNIB operates community-based services for Canadians who are blind or partially sighted. This includes assistance in returning to school, advice on travelling, and emotional support. These services are delivered either at a local CNIB office, within the community, over the phone, online, or in an individual's home. It also offers advocacy support for resources focusing on social issues, such as concessions, housing, finances, and leisure pursuits. Self-help groups are facilitated by staff and volunteers who may be blind or partially sighted.

CNIB provides functional assessments of visual abilities, instruction on how to maximize residual vision, and, as required, information and training in the use of low vision devices. Life-skills training emphasizes managing the essentials of daily living, including safe and effective methods of cooking, alternate communication methods such as braille and large print, and household tasks such as laundry, banking, writing, and personal care. Orientation and mobility instructors provide instruction on how to move safely around the house, and/or skills to travel safely within the community.

Previously, the organization operated a library that includes more than 80,000 accessible materials in formats such as braille, audio, DAISY, and e-text. Assistive technology services included accessible audio book players, video magnifiers, computer screen readers, and other tools for persons with vision loss. Specialists provided instruction through demonstration, assessment, training, and technical support about the availability, selection, use, and purchase of devices for individual needs. The Centre for Equitable Library Access, formed in April 2014, has replaced the CNIB Library.

== Organization ==
CNIB employs approximately 1,100 professionals, working in the fields of life-skills training, library services, research, advocacy, public education, accessible design consulting, fundraising and administration. CNIB also receives support from over 10,000 volunteers working in all regions of the country.

The organization consists of a national office at the CNIB Centre in Toronto and eight provincial and territorial divisions. They are governed by a volunteer board of directors, selected from across Canada, including representatives from the corporate, medical and government sectors, as well as individuals affected by vision loss. There are eight operating divisions, plus the Lake Joseph Centre and the CNIB Library, each with a volunteer board. The chair of each division board sits on a Council of Chairs in order to provide input and advice to CNIB's president and CEO.

== Discounts ==
A number of businesses and government services offer discounted rates for those who are blind or visually impaired upon presentation of a CNIB identification card. The card is offered exclusively to Canadians who are legally blind and registered at CNIB, with 20/200 vision in the best eye with correction or a visual field of 20 degrees or less.

=== Air travel ===
The One Person, One Fare Policy has been in effect since January 10, 2009 and pertains only to domestic flights on Air Canada and WestJet. This policy provides an extra seat to people meeting certain requirements who need a personal attendant on their flight. Attendants are charged the taxes and fees applicable to their flight. A CNIB card does not automatically qualify you with these airlines as each airline has their own process to provide accommodations.

=== Trains ===
Via Rail offers free travel to one escort accompanying a person with vision loss. The escort or attendant travels free in the same class of service. Passengers wishing to travel with an escort must be eligible for a CNIB ID Card and have the card in hand when purchasing a train ticket.

=== Buses ===
Some bus operators offer two-for-one fares, wherein a guide can travel free when accompanying a blind or visually impaired person. The discount applies to travel with Société de transport de la Rive-Sud (STRSM), Corporation métropolitaine des transports de Sherbrooke (CMTS), RÉgie de transport en commum de Shawinigan (RTCS), Corporation inter-municipale de transport des Forges (CITF) and Société de transport du Saguenay (STS) People with vision loss should contact the bus carrier about discounted fares as it varies from province to province.

=== Cultural events ===
Discounts are available on the cost of admission for select cultural events upon presentation of a CNIB ID card. Most major movie theatres take part in a program run by Easter Seals in Canada called Access2Entertainment. The program requires CNIB members to pay an administration fee of $20, which goes to Easter Seals, in order to receive a card good for 5 years. Regardless of their participation in the program, some theaters will still accept the CNIB ID card.
