= Edwin Baker (CNIB) =

Canadian blindness activist

Edwin Albert Baker
- Born: January 9, 1893; Collins Bay, Ontario
- Died: April 7, 1968 (aged 75)
- Occupations: Soldier, activist, Vice-President, Managing Director and General Secretary of the CNIB
- Known for: Co-founder of the Canadian National Institute for the Blind
- Awards: Order of Canada; Order of the British Empire; Military Cross
- Military career
- Branch: Canadian Expeditionary Force
- Service years: 1914 - 1915
- Rank: Colonel
- Units: Sixth Field Company, Canadian Engineers
- Conflicts: World War I (WIA)

Edwin Albert Baker, CC OBE MC (January 9, 1893 – April 7, 1968) was a Canadian co-founder of the Canadian National Institute for the Blind (CNIB).

Born in Collins Bay, Ontario, he graduated with a Bachelor of Science in electrical engineering from Queen's University in 1914 and later that year enlisted with the Sixth Field Company, Canadian Engineers. In 1915, he was wounded in France, losing his sight in both eyes.

In 1918, he and six others founded the CNIB. He served as first Vice-President from 1918 to 1920 and Managing Director & General Secretary from 1920 until his retirement in 1962.

He married Jessie Robinson. They had three sons and a daughter. Robert Baker, guitarist in Canadian rock band The Tragically Hip, is his grandson.

== Honours ==
- In 1935, he was made an Officer of the Order of the British Empire.
- In 1938, he was awarded an Honorary Doctor of Laws from Queen's University; in 1945, the same was from the University of Toronto.
- Croix de Guerre
- In 1967, he was made a Companion of the Order of Canada.
- Baker was portrayed by legally blind actor Bruce Horak in a Historica Canada Heritage Minute released in December 2024.

== Related book ==
- Marjorie Wilkins Campbell (1965). No compromise: the story of Colonel Baker and the CNIB.
