= Simon R. Blatteis =

Austrian-born American pathologist

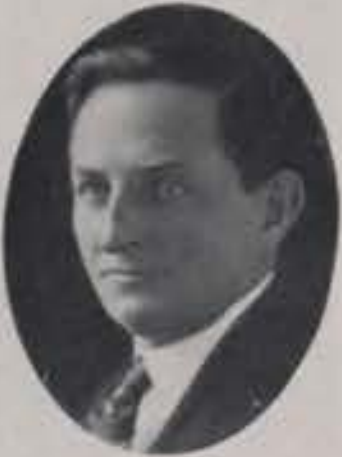
Blatteis in 1925

Simon Risefeld Blatteis (March 27, 1876 – June 11, 1968) was an Austrian-born American pathologist and professor of medicine who led several efforts against infectious disease in New York. He was a leading organizer of New York City's Brownsville and East New York Hospital, for which he also served as the first President of the Medical Board. He was engaged in the practice of medicine for over 50 years.

== Early life and education ==
Blatteis was born in Teschen, Austria-Hungary (now Cieszyn, Poland and Český Těšín, Czech Republic), to Max and Sarah (Risefeld) Blatteis. One source reports Blatteis to have had Czechoslovak ancestry. He came to the United States in 1882, and was naturalized in 1887. He attended the Columbia University College of Physicians and Surgeons from 1893 to 1894, but "his studies were interrupted for two years because of lack of funds", and he received his M.D. from Bellevue Hospital Medical College in June 1898. In preparation for a laboratory career, he also took "special courses at the Carnegie, the Cornell, the New York Post Graduate and Hoagland Laboratories".

== Career in medicine ==
On May 14, 1898, Blatteis became an inspector of medical schools for the New York City Department of Health. Blatteis also became affiliated with Bellevue Hospital Medical College, beginning a 40-year career as an instructor there in 1900. In the summer of 1902, he was among a corps of doctors appointed to serve as vaccinators, to insure that students received vaccinations for smallpox before the beginning of the next school year. He became pathologist in chief of Bellevue Hospital in 1906. In his early years of practice, he "visited his patients on foot, or in a horse and buggy". He was a member of the Williamsburg Medical Society of Williamsburg, Brooklyn, and the Journal of the American Medical Association noted his election as president of that society in 1912.

=== Response to contagious diseases ===
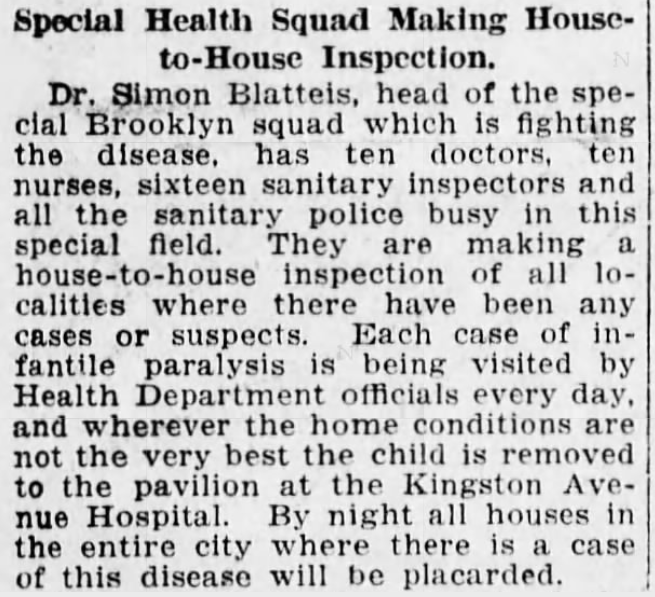
Portion of a June 1916 newspaper article in the Brooklyn Daily Eagle describing Blatteis' work in response to the epidemic.

In 1914, Blatteis led a team that investigated an outbreak of 27 typhoid cases in Park Slope. In 1916, Blatteis was given charge of the response to the 1916 New York City polio epidemic by the New York City Department of Health; the Department held a conference to determine how to deal with the epidemic, where "it was decided to organize a special field force in Brooklyn under Dr. Simon Blatteis of the Department's Bureau of Preventable Diseases". By July 8, 1916, Blatteis had established six clinics in Brooklyn specifically set up to receive polio victims. Polio was a poorly understood disease at the time, and the epidemic subsided in the winter months, after over 2,000 deaths and many more paralysations, with the cause remaining a mystery to investigators and the public.

Blatteis served as a member of the examining consulting board during World War I. In 1917, Blatteis was named chief of the division of epidemiology of the Department of Health, in which capacity Blatteis led numerous additional efforts against epidemics of infectious disease, primarily influenza, and was also the physician who supervised Sara Josephine Baker in the latter's efforts to find and quarantine Mary Mallon (popularly known as Typhoid Mary). From 1917 to 1918, Blatteis also served as a medical assistant to the Kings County District Attorney.

=== Organizing and teaching ===
In 1920, Blatteis was one of the leading organizers of New York City's Brownsville and East New York Hospital, for which he also served as the first President of the Medical Board. During that time, he was a member of various sessions of the American Congress on Internal Medicine. He became a clinical professor of medicine at New York University and Bellevue Hospital Medical College in 1920. In 1924, he was appointed as clinical professor of medicine at the Long Island College Hospital, becoming a full professor in 1930, and remaining in that post until 1941. One Bellevue yearbook recited an anecdote in which Blatteis called on a student in class to answer a question. The student responded very quietly, prompting someone from the back to call out "Louder!", to which Blatteis replied, "You haven't missed anything".

At the 25th annual meeting of the Second District Branch of the Medical Society of the State of New York, Blatteis spoke on the question on how much the patient should be told, concluding that the answer was "as little of possible", a view that was prevalent in that era. He also served for a time as president of the Brooklyn Pathological Society. Blatteis was also affiliated for many years with the Brooklyn Jewish Hospital and Medical Center. A 1938 article notes that he was then "chairman of the interne committee of the medical board" of that hospital, then a newly established program introducing medical internships to the facility. He also served as chief of the medical staff. During World War II, he served as secretary of the Medical Advisory Board.

Blatteis was a Fellow of the American College of Physicians and a Fellow of the New York Academy of Medicine. In 1935, Mayor Fiorello La Guardia honored Blatteis as one of twelve doctors from the Jewish Hospital to receive a Certificate for Distinguished and Exceptional Service to the city.

== Personal life ==
Blatteis married Minnie Levinson on November 4, 1900, in Brooklyn. They had one son, Victor, and one daughter, Eleanor.

Interviewed in his home in 1948, having practiced medicine for over 50 years, Blatteis said that "pessimism and a sour outlook on life" were more harmful than diseases, and that "work, coupled with sufficient relaxation and diversion" were the keys to longevity. In that interview, Blatteis also predicted that a cure for cancer would be found. Blatteis retired to Miami Beach, Florida by the 1950s, although he remained a consulting physician for Brooklyn Jewish Hospital. As of 1957, Blatteis—then 81 years old—continued to be listed as an actively certified medical specialist, remaining so until his death at the age of 92.

== Publications ==
Throughout his career, Blatteis was the author of "numerous articles in professional journals", including:

- "An Unusual Legion of the Large Intestine", Proceedings of the New York Pathological Society (1908), p. 102.
- With Max Lederer, "An Analysis of Four Hundred and Twenty-Six Cerebrospinal Fluids from Various Pathologic Conditions", Journal of the American Medical Association (1913), Vol. 60, p. 811.
- With Max Lederer, "The Bacillus of Typhus Exanthematicus isolated from a Case of Typhus Fever (Brill's Disease)", Long Island Medical Journal (1915), Vol. 10, p. 169.
- "Transient Myelosis in the Course of an Acute Infectious Disease", address to the 115th meeting of the Medical Society of the State of New York on May 5, 1921, reported in New York State Journal of Medicine (1921), Vol. 21, No. 2, p. 63.
