= Patricia Charache =

American physician

Patricia Charache (December 26, 1929 – September 12, 2015) was a physician specializing in infectious disease and microbiology. She was a faculty member at the Johns Hopkins University School of Medicine for more than 50 years, retiring as a Distinguished Professor Emeritus of Pathology, Medicine, and Oncology.

== Early life and education ==
She was born in Maplewood, New Jersey. Her parents, Harold S. Connamacher and Carye-Belle Henle were both physicians. She graduated from Columbia High School in 1948 and enrolled in Oberlin College, where she met Samuel Charache; they were married in 1951. The couple moved to New York and she attended Hunter College, graduating in 1952. She received her M.D. degree from New York University School of Medicine in 1957. As a student there she developed her interest in microbiology.

She did an internship in internal medicine at Baltimore City Hospital (now Mercy Medical Center), followed by clinical and research fellowships at the University of Pennsylvania, the Division of Allergy and Infectious Diseases at Johns Hopkins, and the Department of Pediatrics at Harvard University Medical School.

== Career ==
In 1964, she was hired by Johns Hopkins as an instructor in infectious diseases. From 1966 to 1969 she also served as the assistant chief of medicine at Baltimore City Hospital, which carried with it an academic appointment at the University of Maryland School of Medicine. In 1967 she became the director of the Hopkins microbiology laboratory, which was initially part of the Department of Medicine. The laboratories later moved to the Department of Pathology as the Division of Microbiology, which she directed for 20 years, while also doing clinical practice and research in infectious diseases. She also held a joint appointment in the Department of Molecular Microbiology and Immunology at the Johns Hopkins School of Public Health. Her teaching responsibilities encompassed medical students, graduate students, pathology residents, and fellows in infectious diseases and microbiology. She published more than 100 peer-reviewed articles and papers, and a dozen books or book chapters. She was particularly known for her contributions to the fields of microbiology, infectious disease, and patient safety.

In 1992 she was named a full professor in the Hopkins School of Medicine - only the 30th woman to be named a full professor in the institution's 100-year history. She continued to direct the microbiology division and its laboratories until 1993, when she took on several roles within the Department of Pathology, particularly in the areas of quality improvement and outcomes research, finally retiring in 2015 shortly before her death.

== Awards and recognition ==
Patricia Charache received the 2010 bioMérieux Sonnenwirth Award for Leadership in Clinical Microbiology.

A Hopkins conference room in the Medical Microbiology Division of the Department of Pathology is named for Charache.

== Personal life ==
She was married to Samuel Charache for 64 years until her death. They had a daughter and four grandchildren.
