= Samuel Charache =

American hematologist and professor (1930–2019)

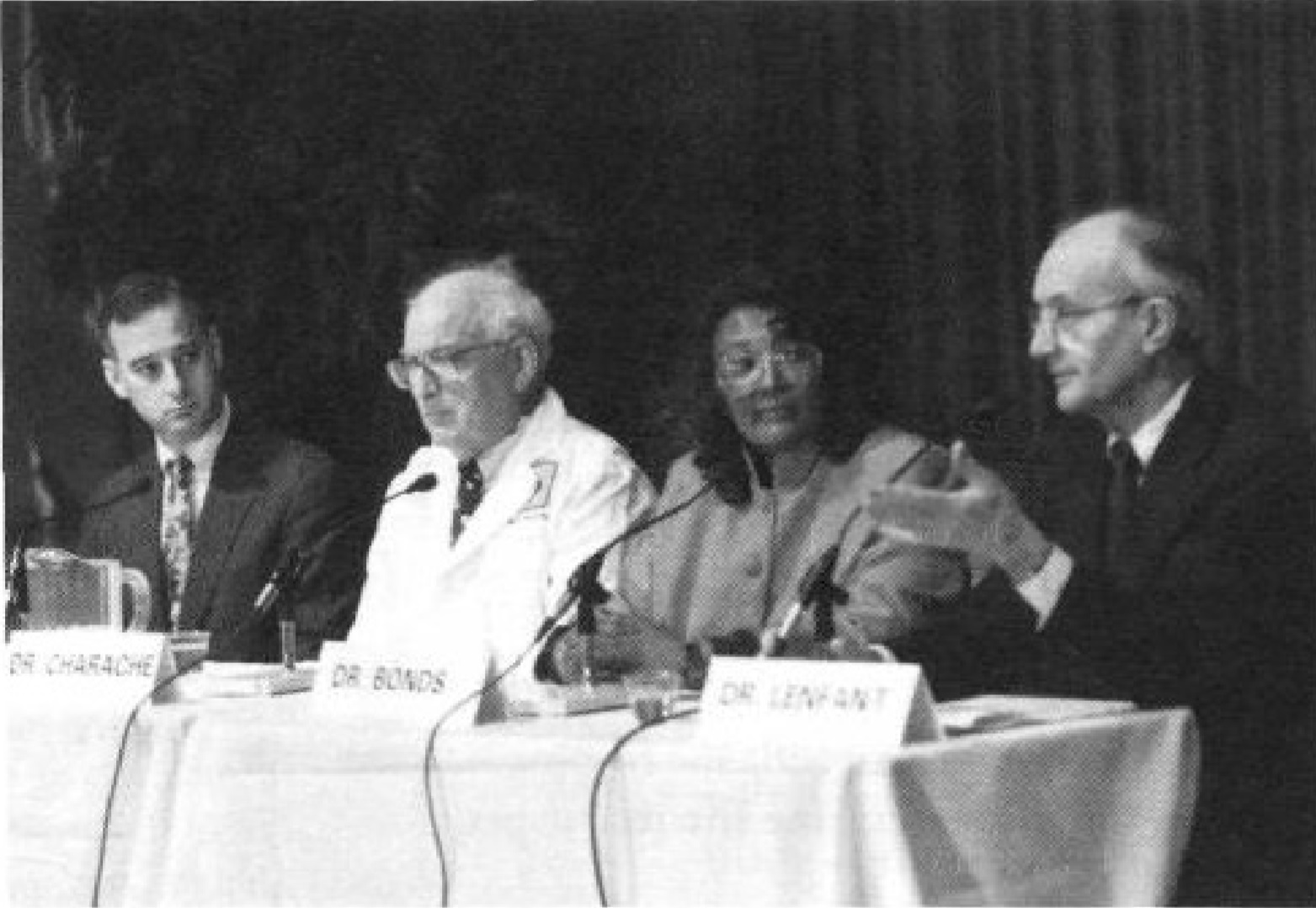
From left: Drs. Michael Terrin, Samuel Charache, Duane Bonds and Claude Lenfant, NHLBI director, announce treatment for sickle cell disease in 1995

Samuel Charache (January 12, 1930 – January 29, 2019) was an American hematologist and professor at Johns Hopkins University. He led the research team that discovered the first effective treatment for sickle cell disease, a painful and sometimes fatal blood disorder that mainly affects people of African ancestry.

== Career ==
He received his bachelor's degree from Oberlin College in 1951 and his M.D. degree from New York University School of Medicine in 1955. He joined the Johns Hopkins faculty in 1966 and became director of the hematology department of Johns Hopkins Hospital in 1969. He was a professor in the departments of both pathology and medicine, retiring in 1995.

== Sickle cell disease ==
He is best known for his discovery of a treatment for sickle cell disease, a hereditary blood disorder that affects more than 70,000 people in the United States, primarily African Americans. The disease gets its name from its effect on red blood cells, which become distorted from their normal round shape into pointed, sickle-shaped cells due to a mutation affecting hemoglobin A, the main form of hemoglobin in adults. When cells sickle they can cause recurrent episodes of acute pain that often require hospitalization, transfusions, and strong pain medication. There is no cure. In the early 1980s a team led by Charache began testing a few patients at Hopkins to see if hydroxyurea, a cancer drug, would help to abate the symptoms of the disease. They found that hydroxyurea treatment could increase recipients' blood levels of hemoglobin F, a form of hemoglobin primarily made by the fetus (and normally only at low levels in adults) that is not affected by the sickle cell mutation.

The results were encouraging, so in the 1990s he and a colleague, pediatrician George Dover, who had been researching sickle cell disease for 20 years, launched a controlled clinical trial. The result was such a dramatic improvement in the condition of the test group that the trial was halted early, so that the control subjects (those receiving a placebo) could benefit from the treatment. Subsequent investigation of the beneficial effects hydroxyurea in people with sickle cell disease has revealed multiple mechanisms (including suppression of inflammatory white blood cells and platelets), but increased levels of hemoglobin F are still thought to play a significant part.

== Personal life ==
While still an undergraduate at Oberlin he met and married Patricia Connamacher Charache. She became a noted physician, served on the Hopkins faculty for more than 50 years, and retired as a Distinguished Professor Emeritus of Pathology, Medicine, and Oncology. They were married for 64 years until her death in 2015, and had one child. He died January 29, 2019, at the age of 89.
