= John Quelch =

John Quelch can refer to the following people:

- John Quelch (pirate) (1666–1704), English pirate
- John Quelch (academic) (born 1951), British-American academic
