= NewYork-Presbyterian Hospital =

Nonprofit academic medical center in New York City

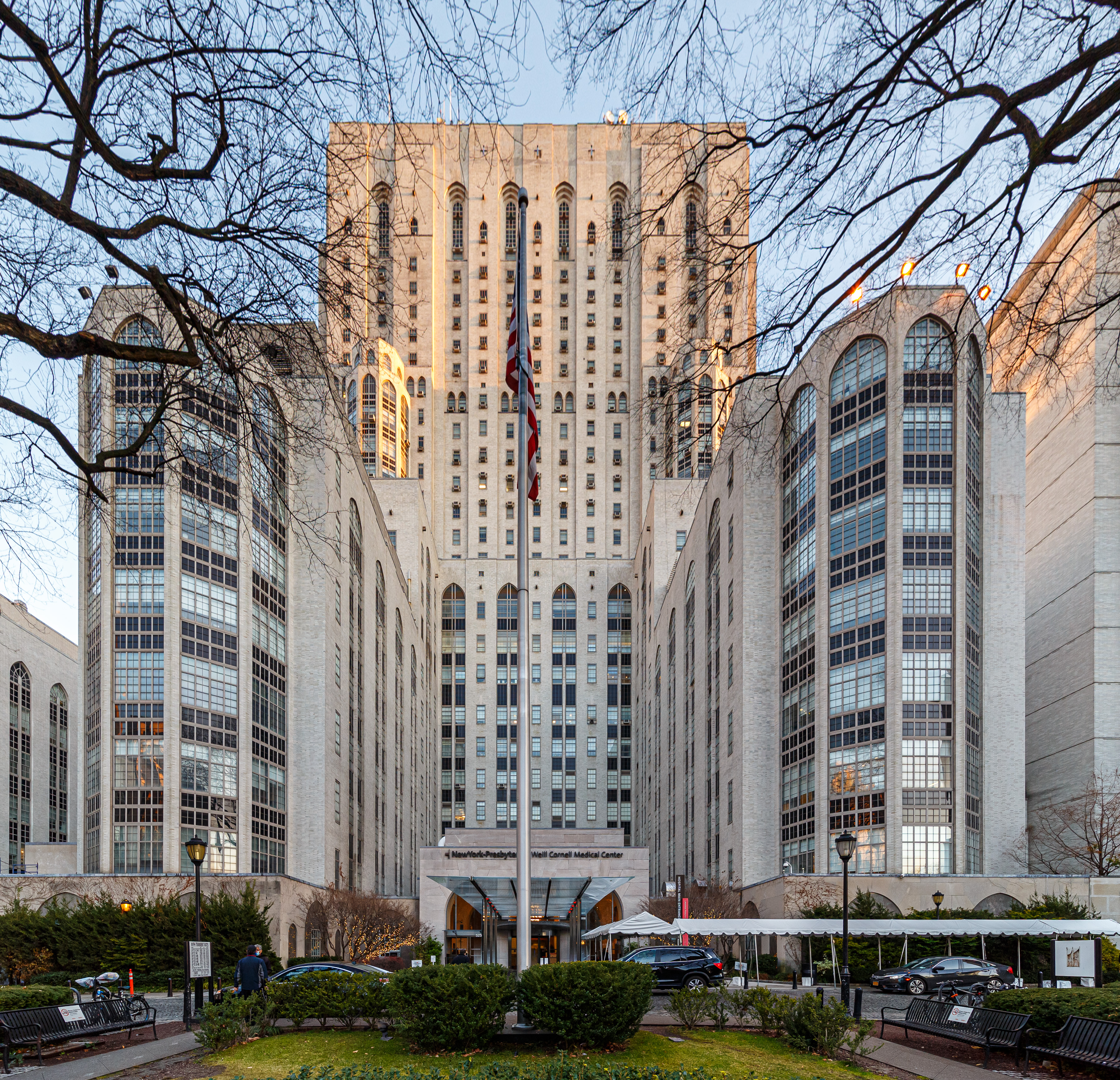
- NewYork-Presbyterian / Weill Cornell Medical Center

Geography
- Location: New York metropolitan area, New York, United States

Organization
- Care system: Medicare, Medicaid, Public
- Type: Teaching
- Affiliated university: Weill Cornell Medicine; Columbia University Vagelos College of Physicians and Surgeons

Services
- Beds: 4,000+

History
- Founded: 1771 (as New York Hospital); 1868 (as Presbyterian Hospital); 1998 (as NewYork-Presbyterian)

Links
- Website: nyp.org
- Lists: Hospitals in New York State
- Other links: Hospitals in Manhattan

The NewYork-Presbyterian Hospital (abbreviated as NYP) is a nonprofit academic medical center in New York City. It is the primary teaching hospital for Weill Cornell Medicine and Columbia University College of Physicians and Surgeons. The hospital includes nine campuses located throughout the New York metropolitan area. The hospital's two flagship medical centers, Columbia University Irving Medical Center and Weill Cornell Medical Center, are located on opposite sides of Upper Manhattan.

As of 2026, the hospital is ranked as the number 1 hospital in New York and the New York City metropolitan area and number 10 for children's specialties in the United States by U.S. News & World Report. The hospital has more than 6,500 affiliated physicians, 20,000 employees and operates 4,000+ beds in total. It is one of the largest hospitals in the world. NYPH annually treats about 310,000 patients in its emergency department and delivers about 15,000 babies.

== History ==
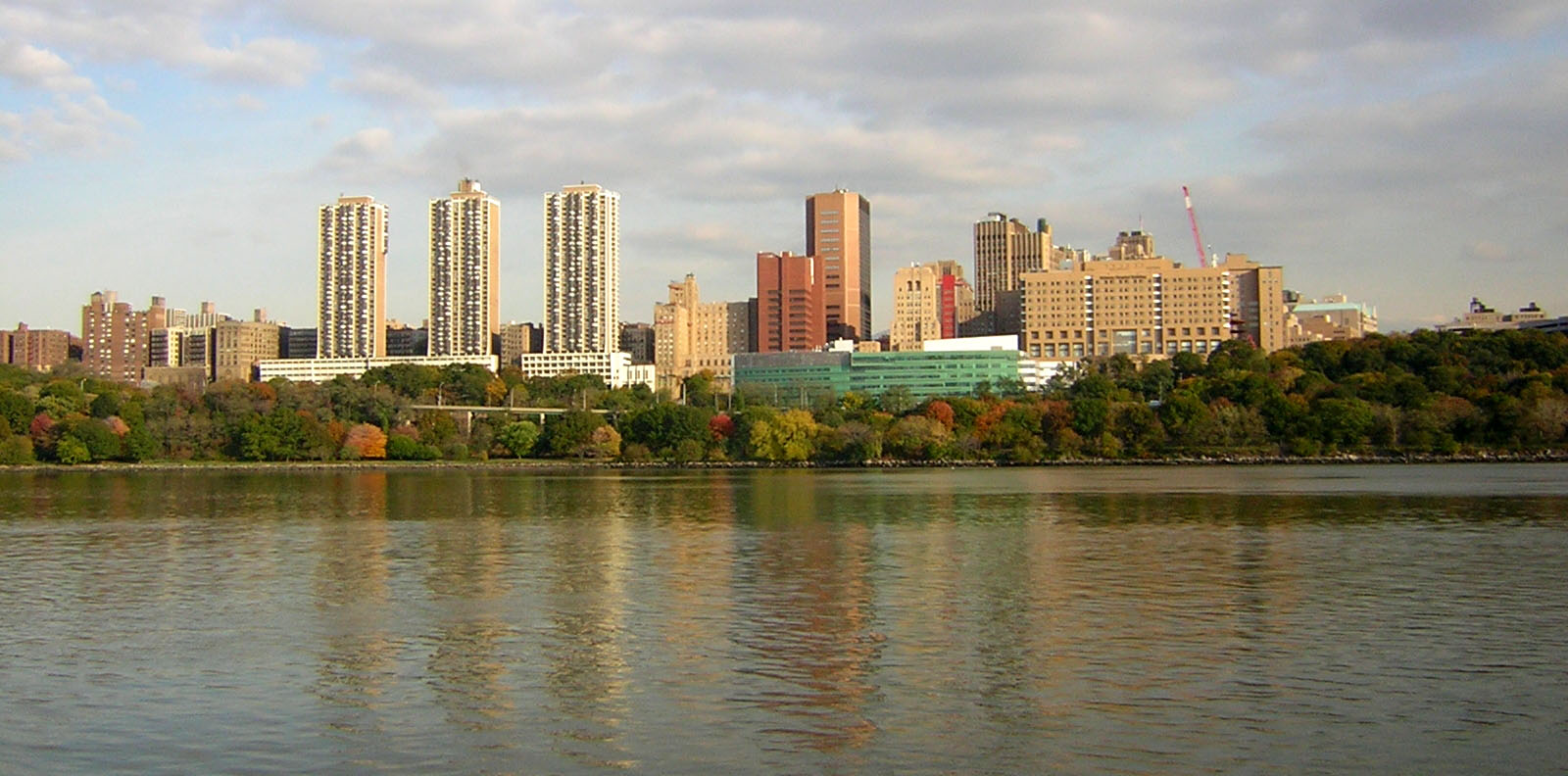
Columbia University Irving Medical Center in the Washington Heights section of Manhattan

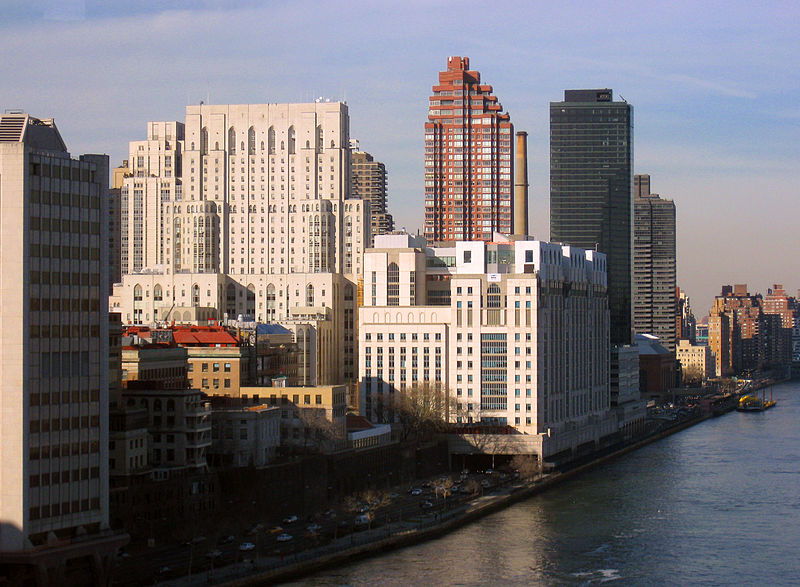
Weill Cornell Medical Center on the Upper East Side section of Manhattan

New York Hospital was founded in 1771 by Edinburgh Medical School graduate Samuel Bard. The hospital was granted a Royal Charter by King George III of Great Britain It is the third oldest hospital in the United States, after Bellevue Hospital in New York City (1736) and Pennsylvania Hospital (1751).

Samuel Bard again played a role in the founding of Columbia University's medical school named Columbia University College of Physicians and Surgeons in 1767.

The Presbyterian Hospital was founded in 1868 by New York philanthropist James Lenox. It was originally located between East 70th and 71st streets and Madison and Park avenues.

Lastly, Cornell University's medical school, now named Weill Cornell Medical College, began in 1898.

=== 20th century ===
In 1910, Columbia University and Presbyterian Hospital reached an agreement to affiliate. During the 1920s, Edward S. Harkness and Anna Harkness purchased land and funded the construction of Columbia-Presbyterian Medical Center.

In 1928, the two institutions fully moved to the new medical center forming the world's first purpose-built academic health center. In 1925, the Sloane Hospital for Women, a leader in obstetrics and gynecology that had been founded in 1886, was incorporated. In 1928 Sloane, along with The Squier Urological Clinic and the Vanderbilt Clinic, moved to Columbia Presbyterian Medical Center.

In 1927, the NY Hospital had grown its endowment to more than $20 million, largely due to the leadership of Payne Whitney who expanded the hospital significantly; Payne Whitney Psychiatric Clinic is named in Whitney's honor. Other prominent donors have included Howard Hughes, William Randolph Hearst, Harry and Leona Helmsley, Maurice R. Greenberg, and others.

NewYork-Presbyterian Hospital, chartered as The New York and Presbyterian Hospital by the State of New York in 1996, was formed in 1998 with the merger of two large, previously independent hospitals, the New York Hospital and Presbyterian Hospital. The merger had been announced on January 1, 1998.

New York Hospital was the subject of a lawsuit from the family of Libby Zion, a young woman admitted in 1984 who died while under the care of overworked hospital residents. An investigation by the New York State Health Commissioner, the Bell Commission, led to restrictions on the number of hours residents could work and required oversight of their care by accredited physicians (this regulation is also known as the Libby Zion law). These reforms have since been adopted nationwide.

=== 21st century ===
In the 2010s, the hospital began to supplement its physical presence with remote and online services. A telemedicine service allows patients to receive follow-up care remotely, a CAT-equipped ambulance (see below NYP-EMS) allows stroke care to take place outside the hospital, and a remote second opinion program uses Grand Rounds technology.

In 2022, the Bronxville hospital known as NewYork-Presbyterian Lawrence, after its founder William Van Duzer Lawrence, was renamed to NewYork-Presbyterian Westchester.

==== COVID-19 pandemic ====
During the initial phase COVID-19 pandemic, the hospital was at the center of the country's response to the virus in the spring of 2020. The hospital was able to triple its ICU bed capacity and ventilator support. During the crisis, teams at the hospital pioneered techniques to assist two patients with one ventilator and shared this around the country. The hospital turned Baker Field and Columbia Soccer Stadium into a 288-bed field hospital in under two weeks.

As was the case at many hospitals in the U.S., clinicians volunteered to help understaffed units. Over 1,000 people volunteered at the hospital, including teams from University of Rochester Medical Center, UCSF Medical Center, Cayuga Medical Center, Mayo Clinic, Cleveland Clinic, University of Pittsburgh Medical Center, UAMS Medical Center, Intermountain Medical Center, and Dartmouth–Hitchcock Medical Center. In November 2020, with cases surging in Utah, a team of 31 nurses and staff from the hospital traveled to offer support to Utah.

On October 13, 2020, with a gift from Ray Dalio, NYP launched the Dalio Center for Health Justice, a research and advocacy organization, which will focus on reducing differences in access to quality health care that overwhelmingly affect communities of color.

== Structure ==
NewYork-Presbyterian Hospital is a 501(c)(3) nonprofit system that includes a variety of outlying hospitals that had been affiliates of the legacy hospitals, NewYork or Presbyterian. The hospitals stretch throughout the five boroughs of New York City, Long Island, Westchester County, and New Jersey.

Along with Weill Cornell Medicine and Columbia University Vagelos College of Physicians and Surgeons, the hospital manages NewYork-Presbyterian Healthcare System, a network of independent, cooperating, acute-care and community hospitals, continuum-of-care facilities, home-health agencies, ambulatory sites, and specialty institutes in the New York metropolitan area. The two medical schools remain essentially autonomous, though there is increasing cooperation and coordination of clinical, research, and residency training programs. The hospitals merged administrations.

President and CEO of NewYork-Presbyterian:

- Herb Pardes, MD - Psychiatrist - 1999–2011
- Steven J. Corwin, MD - Cardiologist - 2011–2026
- Brian G. Donley, MD - Orthopedic surgeon - 2026–Present

The institution's eleven facilities are:

- NewYork-Presbyterian Columbia University Irving Medical Center
- NewYork-Presbyterian Weill Cornell Medical Center
- NewYork-Presbyterian Komansky Children's Hospital
- NewYork-Presbyterian Allen Hospital
- NewYork-Presbyterian Morgan Stanley Children's Hospital
- NewYork-Presbyterian Westchester Behavioral Health Center - formerly the Payne Whitney Psychiatric Clinic, and before that Bloomingdale Insane Asylum
- NewYork-Presbyterian Lower Manhattan Hospital
- NewYork-Presbyterian Westchester - Formerly Lawrence hospital
- NewYork-Presbyterian Hudson Valley Hospital
- NewYork-Presbyterian Queens
- NewYork-Presbyterian Brooklyn Methodist Hospital

== Awards and recognition ==
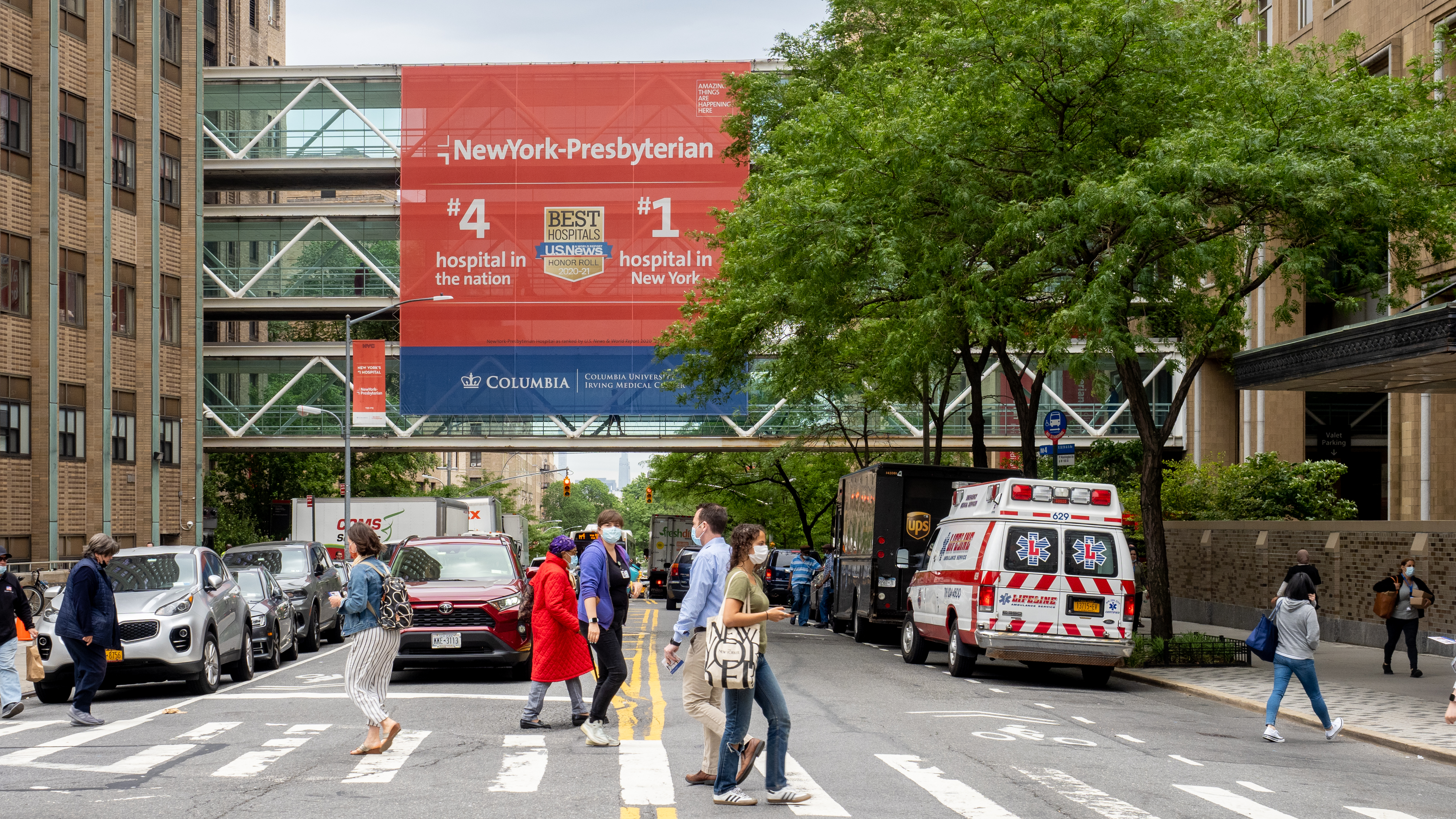
Sky Bridge over Ft. Washington Avenue

In 2026, U.S. News & World Report ranked NewYork-Presbyterian Hospital #13 in the nation. The hospital was ranked as the #1 hospital in New York, the New York Metro area, and the #1 children's hospital in New York. Every specialty was ranked in the top 50 by US News, and the following were ranked in the top 10 of hospitals around the country: cardiology and heart surgery (No. 2), diabetes / endocrinology (No. 2), geriatrics (No. 10), neurology / neurosurgery (No. 4), orthopedics (No. 4), psychiatry (No. 3), urology (No. 4), Obstetrics & Gynecology (No. 3), Ophthalmology (No. 17), Pulmonology & lung surgery (No. 10), Gastroenterology & GI Surgery (No. 15), Rehabilitation (No. 14), and rheumatology (No. 3), a collaborative program with the Hospital for Special Surgery.

== Emergency medical services ==
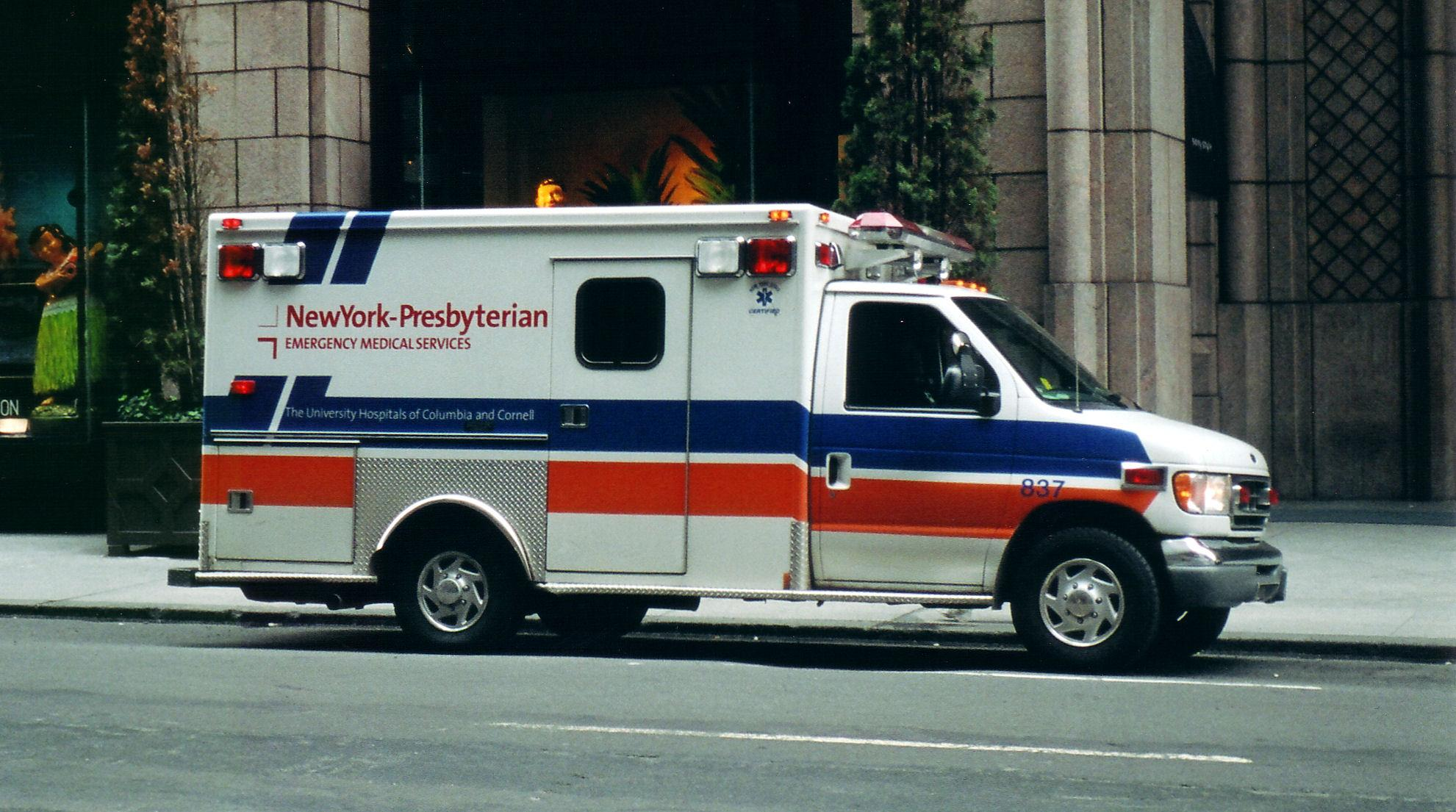
A NewYork-Presbyterian Hospital ambulance

NewYork-Presbyterian Emergency Medical Services (NYP-EMS) is a hospital-based ambulance service that has operated since 1981. NYP-EMS also operates critical care transport ambulances throughout the New York City Metropolitan Area. The service is licensed to operate in the 5 boroughs of New York City, Westchester, Putnam, and Dutchess counties in New York, and in the state of New Jersey for Basic Life Support and Specialty Care Transport. NYP-EMS provides emergency and non-emergency ambulance services, through the New York City 911 system and through the NYP-EMS Communications Center at Weill Cornell Medical Center. It also provides stand-by EMS services for events throughout the New York City area, including the Avon Walk for Breast Cancer and the NYC Triathlon.

NYP-EMS is also a New York State Department of Health-approved training center for EMT and Paramedic programs, several of which are approved for college-level credit by the New York State Department of Education. NYP-EMS operates one of the largest American Heart Association Emergency Cardiac Care training centers in New York.

NYP-EMS also maintains a Special Operations team trained in hazardous materials decontamination and technical rescue. This team, accompanied by several Weill Cornell Physicians, provided rescue and relief support on the Gulf Coast of Mississippi in the aftermath of Hurricane Katrina in 2005. Most recently, the team decontaminated 28 patients after the 2007 New York City steam explosion in Midtown Manhattan on July 18, 2007.

In 2016, the hospital acquired and fielded the first mobile stroke unit on the U.S. East Coast. As of 2018, it is the only hospital in the nation to field three such units. The hospital operates three mobile stroke units with one each based in Manhattan, Brooklyn, and Queens.

Four of the hospital's complexes in the five boroughs of New York City are rated as level I or II trauma centers by the state of New York.

== Facilities ==
=== Columbia University Irving Medical Center ===
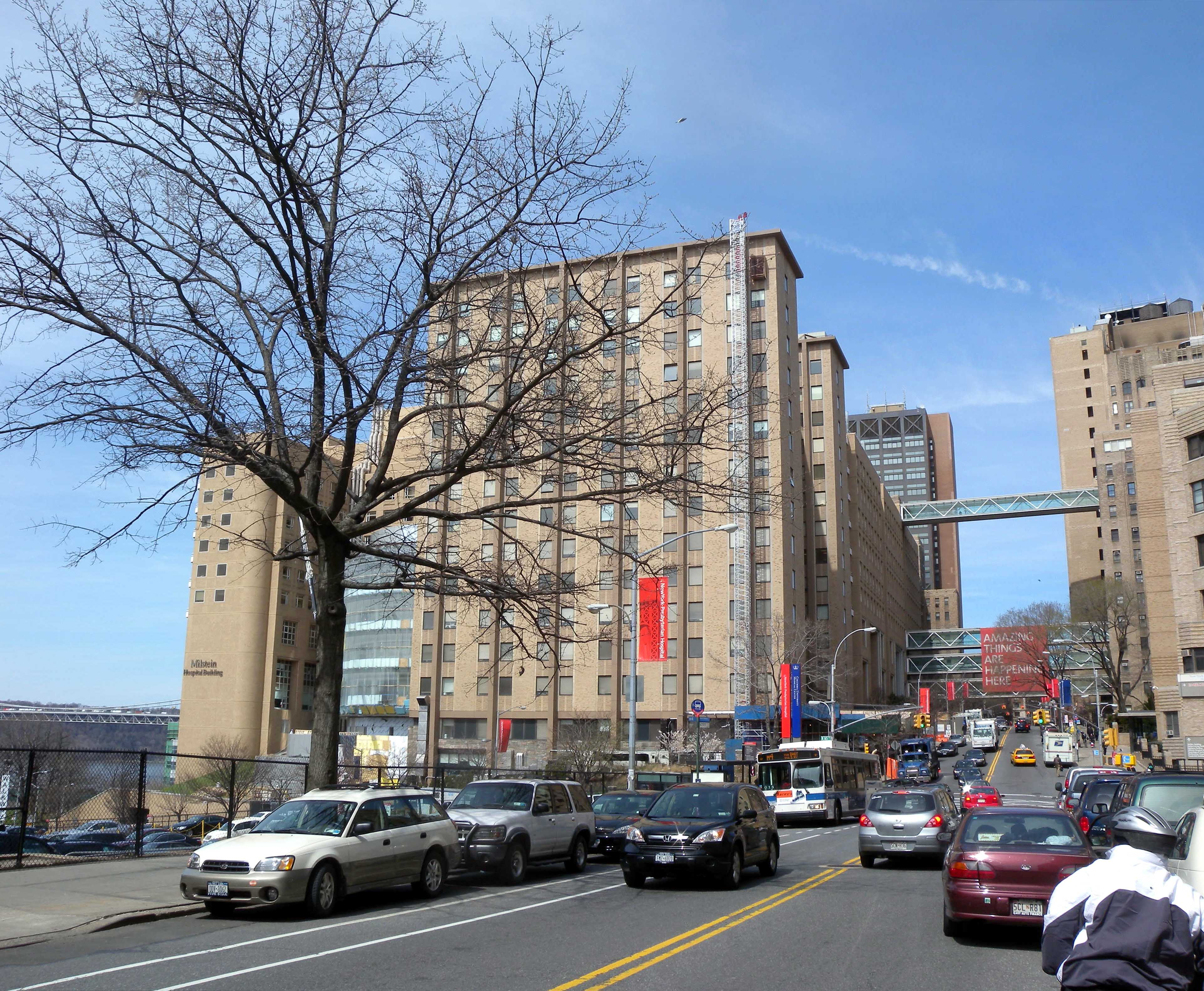
The Milstein building on Ft. Washington Avenue

The NewYork-Presbyterian Hospital / Columbia University Irving Medical Center is located on West 168th Street in the Washington Heights neighborhood of New York City. It contains an emergency room, an eye institute, a chapel, a garden, and more. It is situated on a 20-acre (81,000 m^{2}) campus in the Washington Heights community of Manhattan and accounting for roughly half of Columbia University's nearly $3 billion annual budget, it provides leadership in scientific research, medical education, and more. New York Presbyterian Hospital and Columbia University Irving Medical Center are well known for their strong affiliation with the Neurological Institute of New York, which houses the departments of Neurology and Neurological Surgery and research laboratories.

=== Weill Cornell Medical Center ===
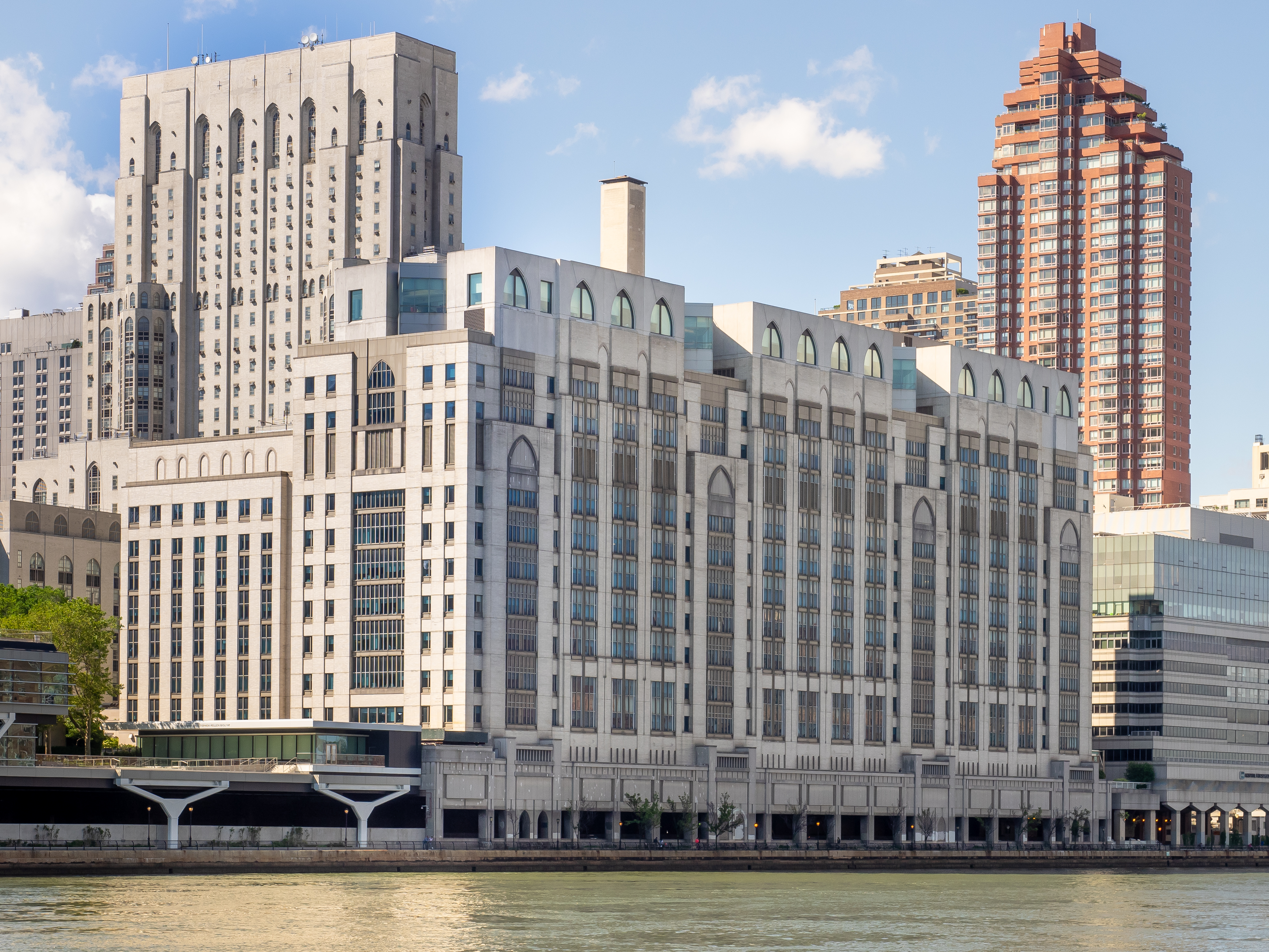
Weill Cornell Medical Center New York Presbyterian

Cornell Medical College was founded in 1898, and established an affiliation agreement with New York Hospital in 1913. The Medical College is divided into 20 academic departments. It is among the top-ranked clinical and medical research centers in the United States of America, although the U.S. Department of Health & Human Services' Medicare program adjudged its rate of admission for heart failure patients to be worse than the national rate. Also housed here is the New York-Presbyterian Phyllis and David Komansky Center for Children's Health. Located at 525 East 68th Street on the Upper East Side in Manhattan (E.68th and York Avenue), New York City, the Komansky Center for Children's Health is a full-service pediatric "hospital within a hospital." The Komansky Center was listed on the 2009 U.S. News & World Report "America's Best Children's Hospitals" "Honor Roll" and one of only 10 children's hospitals in the nation to be ranked in all 10 clinical specialties.

In August 2011, Becker's Hospital Review listed the New York-Presbyterian Hospital/Weill Cornell Medical Center as the fourth-largest grossing hospitals in the nation with $7.52 billion in gross revenue.

=== Allen Hospital ===
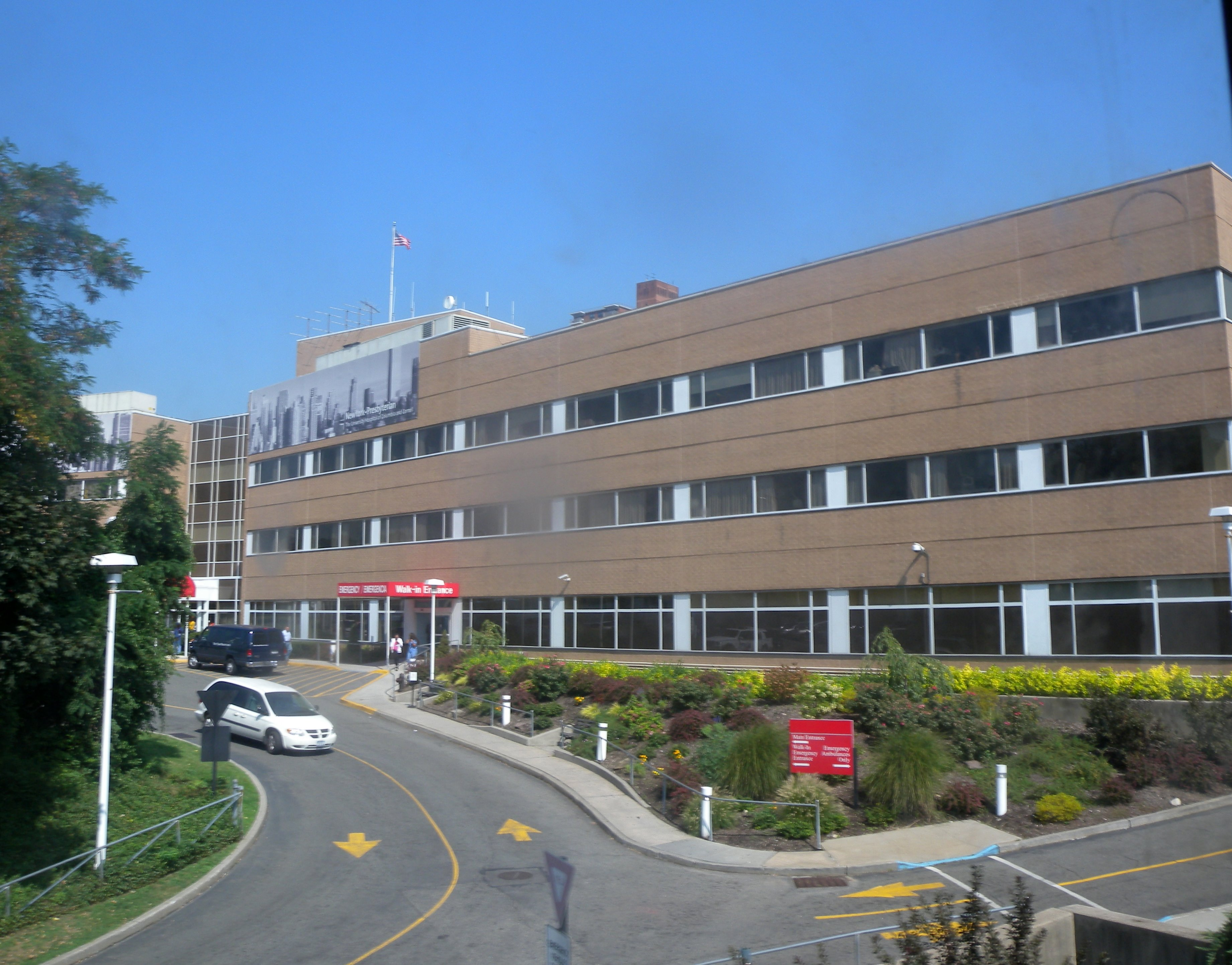
NewYork-Presbyterian/Allen Hospital on Broadway in Manhattan

The Allen Hospital is located at 5141 Broadway and West 220th Street in the northernmost part of the Inwood section of Manhattan. The General Surgery Group of The Allen Hospital specialize in the treatment of hernias and gallbladder diseases. The Hospitalist group and Internal Medicine and Family Medicine residents care for the adult medical patients. There is an active Labor and Delivery Department. It also has the Mila Conanan Memorial Chapel, named after Mila P. Conanan, who had been on the medical center staff for 20 years and the operating rooms director at the Allen Pavilion for three years before her death in 1990.

==== Suicide of emergency room medical director ====
In 2020, Allen Hospital and New York City faced the COVID-19 pandemic. Among the pandemic's fatalities was the medical director of the emergency department, Lorna Breen. After contracting the COVID-19 coronavirus while treating patients and returning to work after recuperation, the police department in Charlottesville, Virginia, released a statement that Breen had died as a result of self-inflicted wounds shortly after they responded to an emergency call at her family home and she was taken to the University of Virginia hospital. Police Chief RaShall Brackney was quoted in an official statement:

Frontline healthcare professionals and first responders are not immune to the mental or physical effects of the current pandemic. On a daily basis, these professionals operate under the most stressful of circumstances, and the Coronavirus has introduced additional stressors. Personal Protective Equipment (PPE) can reduce the likelihood of being infected, but what they cannot protect heroes like Dr. Lorna Breen, or our first responders against is the emotional and mental devastation caused by this disease.

=== Morgan Stanley Children's Hospital ===
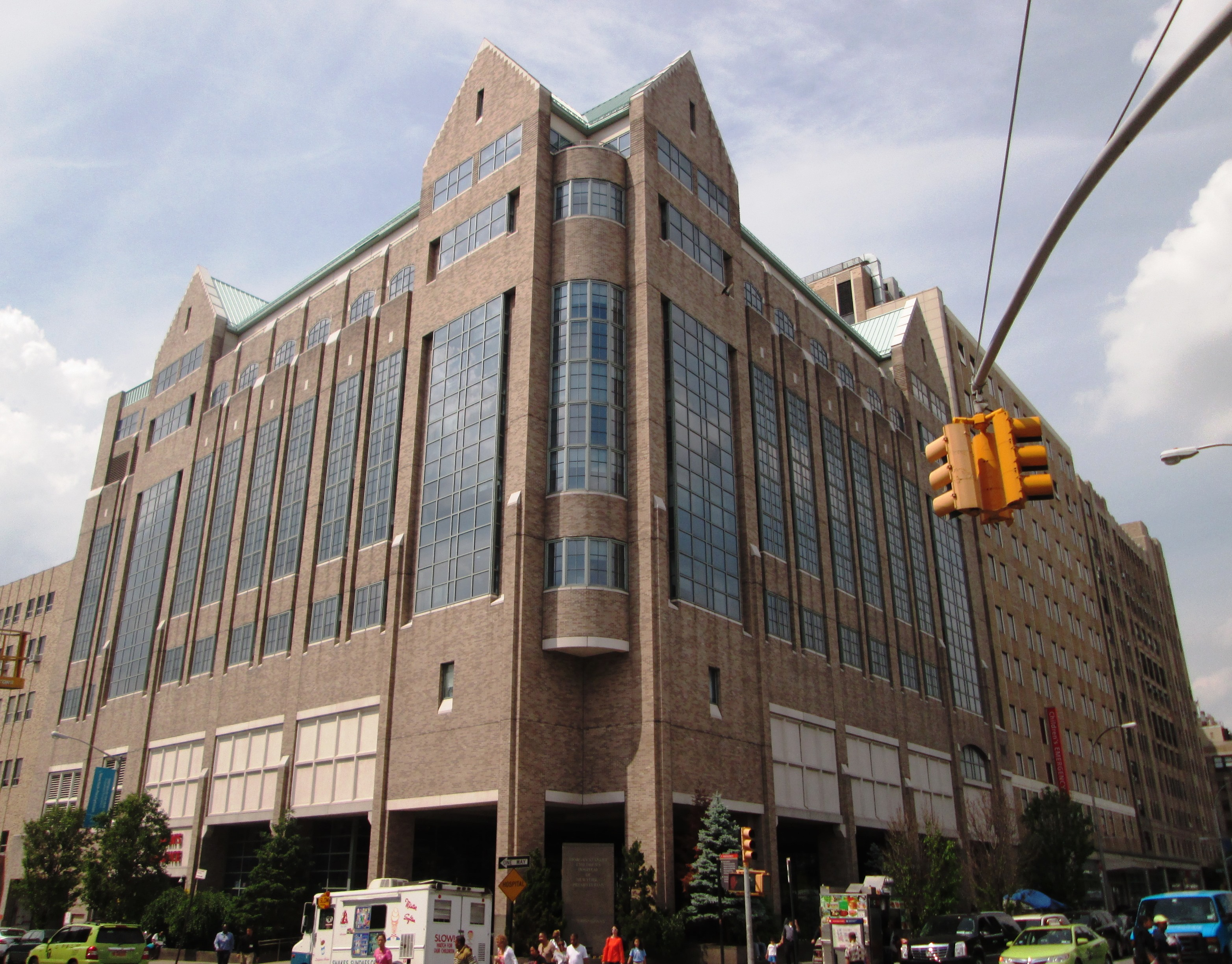
The front of Morgan Stanley Children's Hospital in 2014

Located on 3959 Broadway (165th Street and Broadway), New York City, NewYork-Presbyterian Morgan Stanley Children's Hospital is a pediatric hospital in New York–Presbyterian Hospital. They are especially known for their expertise in pediatric heart surgery. It was listed on the 2009 U.S. News & World Report "America's Best Children's Hospitals" "Honor Roll" and one of only 10 children's hospitals in the nation to be ranked in all 10 clinical specialties. The hospital houses the only pediatric Level 1 Trauma Center in Manhattan.

=== Komansky Children's Hospital ===
Komansky Children's Hospital is a pediatric acute care hospital located within Weill Cornell Medical Center. The hospital has 103 beds and is affiliated with Weill Cornell Medical School. The hospital provides comprehensive pediatric specialties and subspecialties to pediatric patients aged 0–20 throughout New York City. Komansky Children's Hospital features a Level II Trauma Center and houses the only pediatric burn unit in the region. The hospital was named for trustee David Komansky

=== Lower Manhattan Hospital ===
On July 1, 2013, NYP announced its merger with the former New York Downtown Hospital to form the Lower Manhattan Hospital (LMH) campus of the NewYork-Presbyterian Hospital. LMH is one of the few hospitals in Lower Manhattan south of Greenwich Village. The campus operates 170 beds and offers a full range of inpatient and outpatient services. LMH serves the diverse neighborhoods of Wall Street, Battery Park City, Chinatown, SoHo, TriBeCa, Little Italy, and the Lower East Side, and is the closest acute care facility to both the Financial District and to the seat of New York City's government.

=== Queens ===
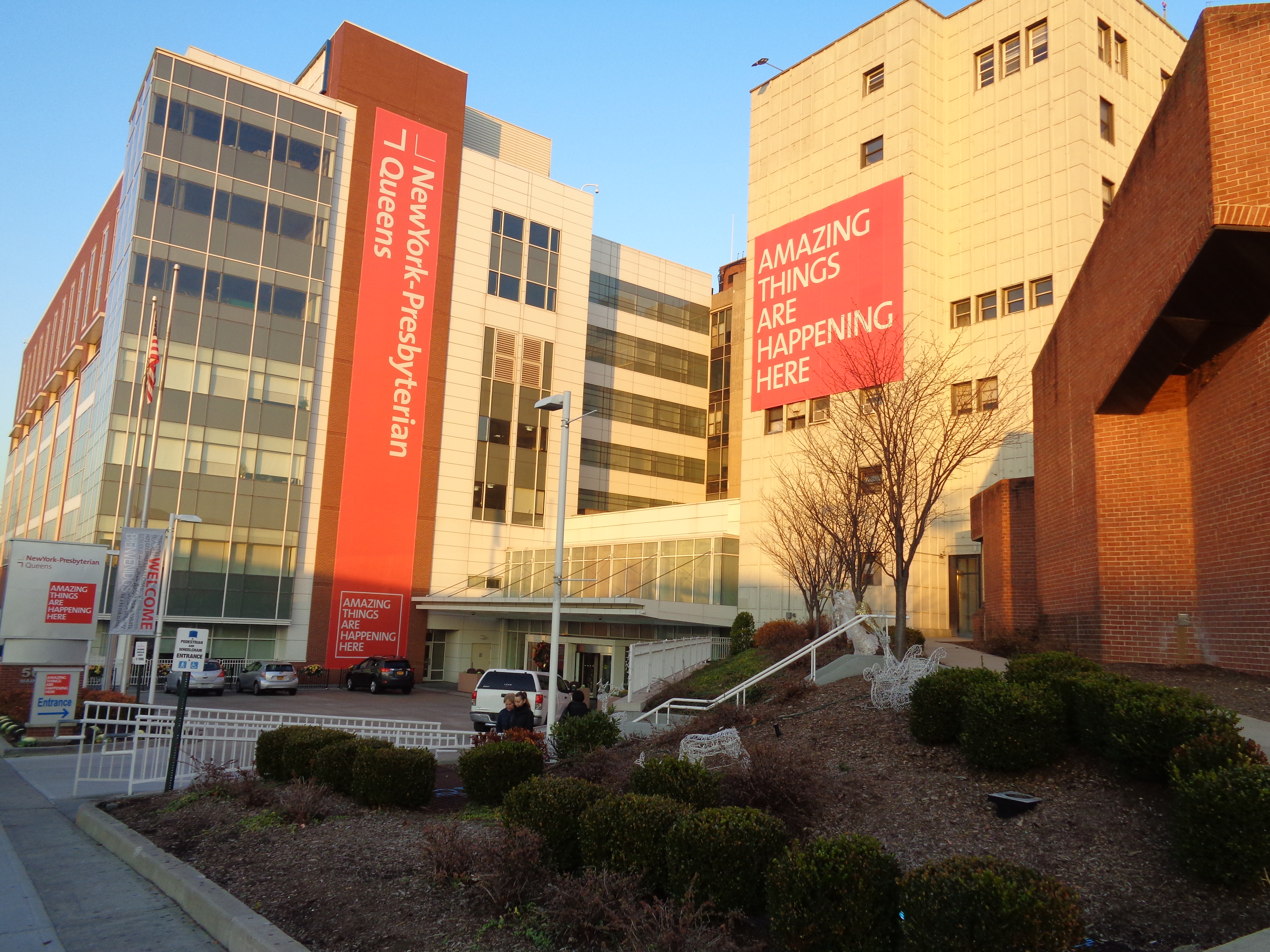
NewYork–Presbyterian Queens

On July 10, 2015, NYP announced its merger with the former New York Hospital Queens, formerly known as Booth Memorial Medical Center, to form the Queens campus of the NewYork-Presbyterian Hospital. Located in Flushing, Queens, NewYork-Presbyterian/Queens is a teaching hospital affiliated with Weill Cornell Medical College that serves Queens and metro New York residents. The 535-bed tertiary care facility provides services in 14 clinical departments and numerous subspecialties, including 15,000 surgeries and 4,000 infant deliveries each year. With its network of affiliated primary and multispecialty care physician practices and community-based health centers, the hospital provides approximately 162,000 ambulatory care visits and 124,000 emergency service visits annually.

=== Hudson Valley Hospital ===
Founded in 1889 by the Helping Hand Association, NewYork-Presbyterian/Hudson Valley Hospital, located in Cortlandt Manor, New York, serves residents of the Hudson Valley and Westchester County. The 128-bed facility provides a wide range of ambulatory care and inpatient services, with 350 physicians on staff in 43 specialties. The hospital is home to the region's only state-of-the-art, 24-hour "no wait" emergency department, which sees more than 39,000 visits per year. In 2011, the Cheryl R. Lindenbaum Cancer Center opened, offering the first comprehensive cancer center in the area, combining infusion, radiation therapy and support services all under one roof.

=== Ronald O. Perelman Heart Institute ===
Ronald O. Perelman Heart Institute is a medical town square dedicated to the treatment of heart disease patients in New York City. Ronald O. Perelman, chairman of MacAndrews & Forbes Holdings Inc., made a $50 million gift to the NewYork-Presbyterian Hospital/Weill Cornell Medical Center on February 28, 2009, to establish the institute. The Heart Institute has a welcome center, a clinical trials enrollment center, and an interactive education resource center that includes medical information on heart disease — with an added focus on cardiac disease in women.

== In popular culture ==
The ABC documentary series NY Med, produced by ABC News, features NewYork–Presbyterian Hospital/Weill Cornell Medical Center and NewYork–Presbyterian Hospital/Columbia University Medical Center.

Marvel Comics's fictional surgeon Doctor Strange attended Columbia University College of Physicians and Surgeons and completed his residency at NewYork-Presbyterian Hospital.

== See also ==
- History of public health in New York City
