= Neider =

Neider is a surname of German origin.

Neider may refer to:

== People ==
- Andreas Neider (born 1958), German writer
- Charles Neider (1915–2001), American writer
- Linda L. Neider, American professor, scholar, educator and university administrator

== Fictional Character ==
- Auel Neider, a fictional character from Mobile Suit Gundam SEED DESTINY
