= Henrik Cronqvist =

Swedish academic, researcher, and author

- Citizenship: United States and Sweden

Academic background
- Education: Stockholm School of Economics; University of Chicago
- Thesis: Advertising and Portfolio Choice
- Doctoral advisor: Richard H. Thaler

Academic work
- Institutions: Ohio State University, Fisher College of Business (2004-2008); Claremont McKenna College, Robert Day School of Economics and Finance (2008-2013); University of Miami, University of Miami School of Business (2015-2022), Dean, Argyros School of Business and Economics, Chapman University (2022-2025)
- Main interests: Behavioral finance, social finance, corporate finance

Henrik Cronqvist was the Robert J. and Carolyn A. Waltos Dean and Professor of Economics of the George L. Argyros School of Business and Economics at Chapman University in Orange, California from August 2022 to May 2025. Since taking over the role, significant staff turnover has occurred. He previously served as a professor of finance, Bank of America scholar, and vice dean for faculty and research at the University of Miami School of Business, where he conducted interdisciplinary research and taught finance and management courses at both undergraduate and graduate levels.

He also served as chair of the department of finance and director of Ph.D. programs at the University of Miami School of Business.

Cronqvist's research focuses on behavioral, social, and corporate finance with a focus on the behavior of corporate executives and investors.

== Early life and education ==
After high school, Cronqvist completed his military service at the Scania Wing (F 10). He received an M.S. in business and economics in 1997 and an Ekonomie Licentiat in finance in 1999 from Stockholm School of Economics, where he received the award for Most Outstanding Master's Thesis in Finance.

Under the guidance of his advisor Richard H. Thaler, Cronqvist completed his dissertation on "Advertising and Portfolio Choice." During his Ph.D. studies, Cronqvist received a fellowship from the Sweden-America Foundation, Marcus Wallenberg's scholarship for Ph.D. studies in finance in the U.S., and a research grants from Torsten och Ragnar Söderberg Foundations and the Center for Research in Security Prices, and travel grants from the American Finance Association and the Russell Sage Foundation.

== Career ==
In 2004, Cronqvist joined Fisher College of Business at Ohio State University as an assistant professor of finance. In 2007, he received the Fisher College of Business Pace Setter Award for Excellence in Research, the college's highest research award. In 2008, he joined Claremont McKenna College, Robert Day School of Economics and Finance. He was promoted to associate professor in 2010, and held the McMahon Family Chair in Corporate Finance and was a George R. Roberts Fellow.

In 2013, Cronqvist joined China Europe International Business School (CEIBS) as professor of finance and held the Zhongkun Group Chair. In 2014, he received the CEIBS Research Excellence Award.

Cronqvist has held several visiting professorships, including at Yale University, University of California Irvine, Shanghai Advanced Institute of Finance, and LMU Munich.

Cronqvist is currently associate editor of The Review of Financial Studies. He has led executive education programs in the United States, Asia, and Latin America, and is involved in consulting with corporations, investment firms, banks, and law firms.

=== University of Miami ===
In 2015, Cronqvist joined the University of Miami School of Business as a professor of finance. He later served as director of Ph.D. programs at the University of Miami from 2016 to 2019, and chairman of the department of finance from 2017 to 2018.

In 2018, he was appointed by University of Miami School of Business dean John Quelch as vice dean for faculty and research. In January 2020, he was appointed Bank of America Scholar.

=== Research and work ===
Cronqvist has performed research in behavioral and social finance with a specialization in the study of the behavior of corporate executives and investors. He has published in top-journals in economics, including the American Economic Review (Papers and Proceedings) and the Journal of Political Economy, and in finance, including The Journal of Finance, Journal of Financial Economics, and The Review of Financial Studies.

Several of his research papers have been recognized with best paper awards at international conferences and have been sponsored by competitive research grants. His research has been covered in print and electronic media, including The Wall Street Journal, Harvard Business Review, The Financial Times, The Economist, The New York Times, BusinessWeek, Forbes, and CNBC.

== Awards and honors ==
- 2006 - Best Paper Award, Financial Management Association's Annual European Meeting
- 2007 - Center for International Business Education and Research (CIBER) Global Competence Award
- 2007 - Pace Setters Outstanding Research Award, Ohio State University, Fisher College of Business
- 2010 - Yihong Xia Best Paper Award, China International Conference in Finance
- 2010 - Best Paper Award, Financial Management Association
- 2010 - Best Paper Award, Arison School of Business, Interdisciplinary Center (IDC)
- 2010 - Best Paper Award in Category Investments, Financial Management Association's Annual Meeting
- 2010 - Best Paper Award, University of Michigan, Stephen M. Ross School of Business, Mitsui Finance Symposium
- 2011 - Faculty Research Award of the Betty F. Elliott Initiative for Academic Excellence, College of Business at the University of Michigan-Dearborn
- 2012 - Outstanding Paper Award, National Taiwan University International Conference on Finance
- 2012 - Best Paper Award, American Real Estate Society
- 2014 - CEIBS Research Excellence Award
- 2015 - Outstanding Paper Award, Midwest Finance Association's Annual Meeting
- 2016 - Best Paper Award in Finance, Accounting & Finance Association of Australia and New Zealand
- 2017 - CIBER Mini Grant Award
- 2017 - Provost's Research Award

== Selected publications ==
=== Articles ===
- "When nudges are forever: Inertia in the Swedish premium pension plan," with Richard H. Thaler and Frank Yu, 2018, AEA Papers and Proceedings 108, 153–158.
- "Shaped by their daughters: Executives, female socialization," and corporate social responsibility, with Frank Yu, 2017, Journal of Financial Economics 126, 543–562.
- "The fetal origins hypothesis in finance: Prenatal environment, the gender gap, and investor behavior," with Alessandro Previtero, Stephan Siegel, and Roderick E. White, 2016, Review of Financial Studies 29, 739–786.
- "Value versus growth investing: Why do different investors have different styles?," with Stephan Siegel and Frank Yu, 2015, Journal of Financial Economics 117, 333–349.
- "The origins of savings behavior," with Stephan Siegel, 2015, Journal of Political Economy 123, 123–169.
- "The genetics of investment biases," with Stephan Siegel, 2014, Journal of Financial Economics 113, 215–234.
- "CEO contract design: How do strong principals do it?," with Rüdiger Fahlenbrach, 2013, Journal of Financial Economics 108, 659–674.
- "Behavioral consistency in corporate finance: CEO personal leverage and corporate leverage," with Anil K. Makhija and Scott E. Yonker, 2012, Journal of Financial Economics 103, 20–40.
- "Nature or nurture: What determines investor behavior?," with Amir Barnea and Stephan Siegel, 2010, Journal of Financial Economics 98, 583–604.
- "Large shareholders and corporate policies," with Rüdiger Fahlenbrach, 2009, Review of Financial Studies 22, 3941–3976.
- "Do entrenched managers pay their workers more?," with Fredrik Heyman, Mattias Nilsson, Helena Svaleryd, and Jonas Vlachos, 2009, Journal of Finance 64, 309–339.
- "The choice between rights offerings and private equity placements," with Mattias Nilsson, 2005, Journal of Financial Economics 78, 375–407.
- "Design choices in privatized social-security systems: Learning from the Swedish experience," with Richard H. Thaler, 2004, American Economic Review 94, 424–428.
- "Agency costs of controlling minority shareholders," with Mattias Nilsson, 2003, Journal of Financial and Quantitative Analysis 38, 695–719. (Lead article.)

=== Book chapters ===
- "Behavioral and Social Corporate Finance," with Déesirée-Jessica Pély, in Oxford Research Encyclopedia of Economics and Finance, edited by Jonathan Hamilton, Avinash Dixit, Sebastian Edwards, and Kenneth Judd, and published by Oxford University Press, United Kingdom, 2019.
- "Individual Investors," with Danling Jiang, in Financial Behavior: Players, Services, Products, and Markets, edited by H. Kent Baker, Greg Filbeck, and Victor Ricciardi, and published by Oxford University Press, United Kingdom, 2017.
