= Weill Cornell Medical Center =

Hospital in New York City

- NewYork-Presbyterian Hospital

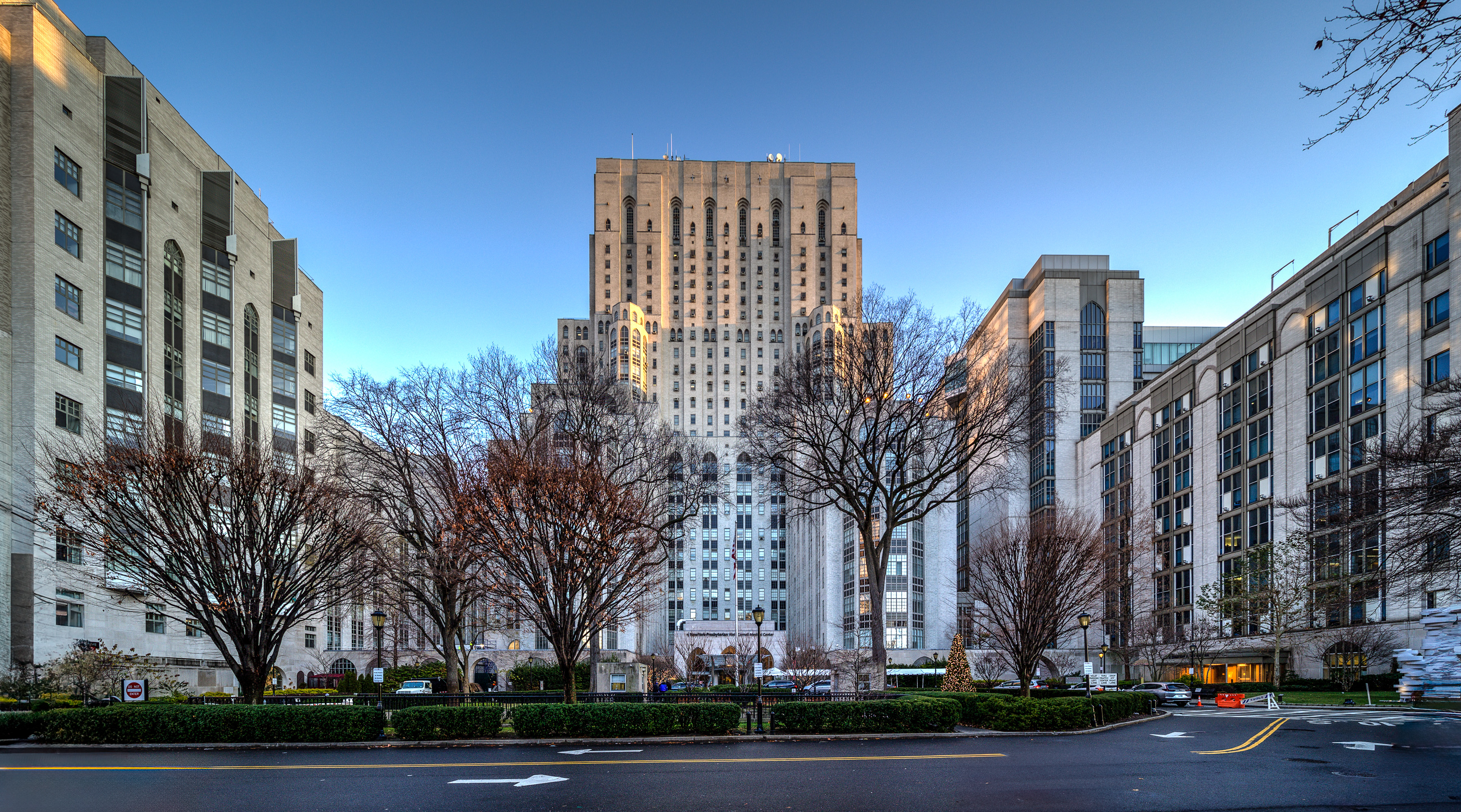
- Weill Cornell Medical Center's campus in 2021

Geography
- Location: 525 East 68th Street, New York City, NY, U.S.
- Coordinates: 40°45′53″N 73°57′14″W

Organisation
- Care system: Non-profit
- Type: Teaching
- Affiliated university: Weill Cornell Medicine (Cornell University)

Services
- Emergency department: Level I Adult Trauma Center / Level II Pediatric Trauma Center
- Beds: 862 in current Upper East Side location

History
- Opened: 1771; 255 years ago

Links
- Website: weill.cornell.edu
- Lists: Hospitals in U.S.

Weill Cornell Medical Center (/waɪl/; previously known as New York Hospital, Old New York Hospital, and City Hospital) is a research hospital in New York City. It is the teaching hospital for Cornell University's medical school and is part of NewYork-Presbyterian Hospital.

The hospital was founded in 1771 with a charter from George III. It is the second-oldest hospital in New York City and third-oldest hospital in the United States. Since 1912, it has been the main teaching hospital for Weill Cornell Medicine, the biomedical research unit and medical school of Cornell University.

Weill Cornell is located on East 68th Street and York Avenue on the Upper East Side of New York City. Prior to moving there in 1932, it was located on Broadway between Duane Street and Anthony Street on present-day Worth Street. In 1998, New York Hospital merged with Presbyterian Hospital to form NewYork-Presbyterian Hospital.

== History ==
=== 18th century ===
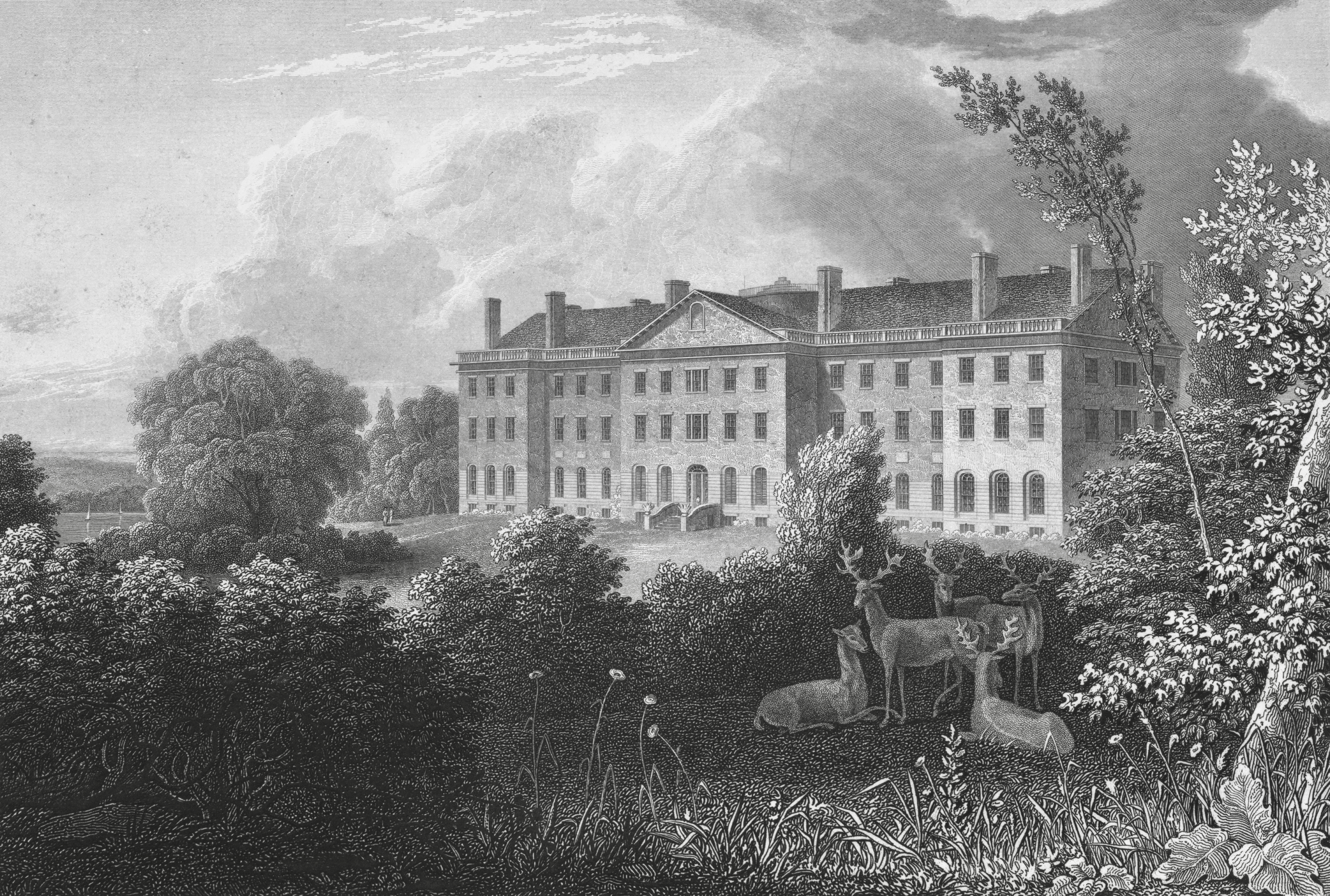
Bloomingdale Insane Asylum, c. 1830

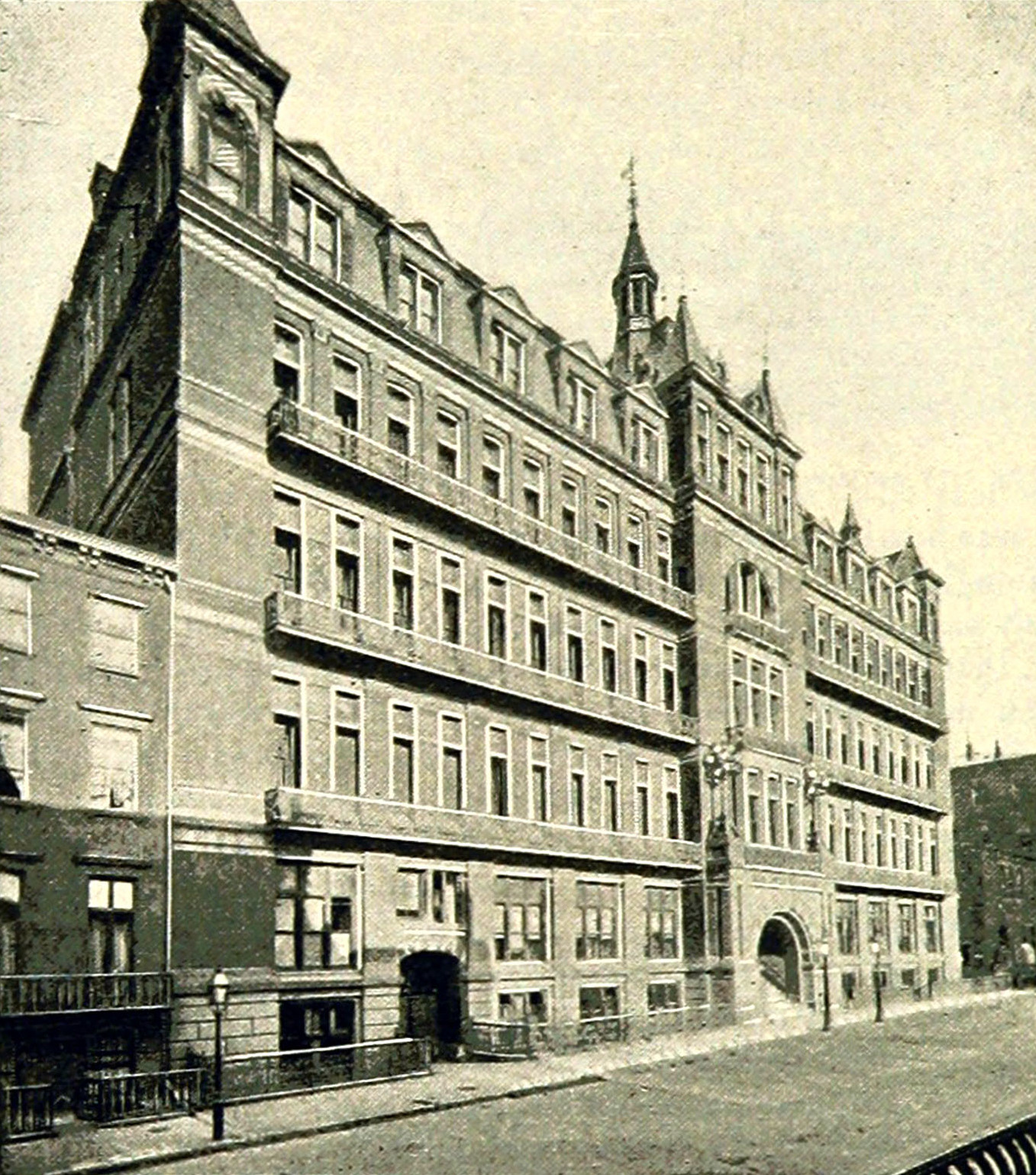
An 1893 illustration of the hospital's West 15th Street façade, near Fifth Avenue

The hospital's origin can be traced to a 1769 commencement address by Samuel Bard, a graduate of the University of Edinburgh Medical School and professor of medicine, which was delivered to the first two medical doctors to graduate from King's College, now Columbia University Vagelos College of Physicians and Surgeons, titled “A discourse upon the duties of a physician, with some sentiments on the usefulness and necessity of a public hospital.” New York City leaders later pledged one thousand pounds sterling to the hospital's creation.

Later the same year, on November 3, 1769, Peter Middleton reported on progress with the hospital's creation in another address to King's College, stating “the necessity and usefulness of a public infirmary has so warmly and pathetically set forth in a discourse delivered by Dr. Samuel Bard... that his Excellency, Sir Henry Moore immediately set on foot a subscription for that purpose to which himself and most of the gentlemen present liberally contributed.” Soon thereafter, the new Governor of the Colony, John Murray, 4th Earl of Dunmore through the interposition of Lieutenant Governor Cadwallader Colden started a fund for the establishment of such a hospital.

On June 13, 1771, King George III of Great Britain granted a royal charter to establish "The Society of the New York Hospital in the City of New York in America" and a Board of Governors for the "reception of such patients as require medical treatment, chirurgical management and maniacs." The first regular meeting of the Governors after its organization was held on July 24, 1771, at Fraunces Tavern, the same location where General Washington would bid farewell to his officers on December 4, 1783.

Attending the first meeting were then hospital president John Watts, Philip Livingston, and Gerardus William Beekman. The Governors purchased 5 acres (2.0 ha) in 1771, on elevated ground surrounded at the time on three sides by marshes. The location was several miles from the central part of New York; apparently the expansion of the city and the drainage of the marshes, which harbored malaria, was anticipated.

A building's construction began in 1773 but was destroyed by fire before its completion. The American Revolutionary War delayed the building's reconstruction but a partial structure on Broadway and Duane Street served as a barracks for Hessian and British Army soldiers, as a laboratory for teaching anatomy to medical students, and as a military hospital.

Although initially ignored by the wider community, grave-robbing incidents in the 1780s were met with public outrage after medical students – who were taking the corpses in order to dissect them for anatomical study – turned from stealing from the "Negroes Burying Ground" to the more closely-located, and white, Trinity Churchyard. This provoked a raid on the university, an attack on the student perpetrators, and the "doctors' riot" of 1788.

The hospital opened on January 3, 1791. Initially it was a small, two-story H-shaped building located along the west side of Broadway between present day Worth and Duane streets, set back from the street frontage about 90 feet to allow for landscaping and expansion. The hospital's first patients were suffering from smallpox, syphilis, and acute bipolar disorder. In 1798, the hospital's governors announced the hospital's priorities as medical treatment, surgical treatment, psychiatric treatment of the medically ill (then called "maniacs"), and post-partum treatment of women.

=== 19th century ===
After some years of experience in treating the mentally ill, the hospital's board of governors decided to construct an additional building designed to specialize in treatment of the mentally ill. After receiving financial assistance from the New York state legislator, the governors erected "a substantial and spacious stone edifice on the grounds of the hospital in the city, within the same enclosure, and but a few rods distant from the original building. It was finished and opened on July 15, 1808. On the same day, 19 patients were moved to it from wards in other buildings and 48 total patients were admitted. The new department was called the Lunatic Asylum.

In June 1821, the hospital opened the Bloomingdale Insane Asylum on Broadway and West 116th Street in Morningside Heights. Due to real estate pressures, the hospital moved to White Plains, New York in 1891, where it eventually became the Payne Whitney Psychiatric Clinic, now known as "New York-Presbyterian/Westchester". The Morningside Heights site became part of Columbia University.

New York Hospital outgrew its original building by the 1870s and moved to a new building between Fifth and Sixth Avenues and West 15th and 16th Streets, which opened in 1877. The original facility was maintained as a 'house of relief', which moved to Hudson Street in 1884.

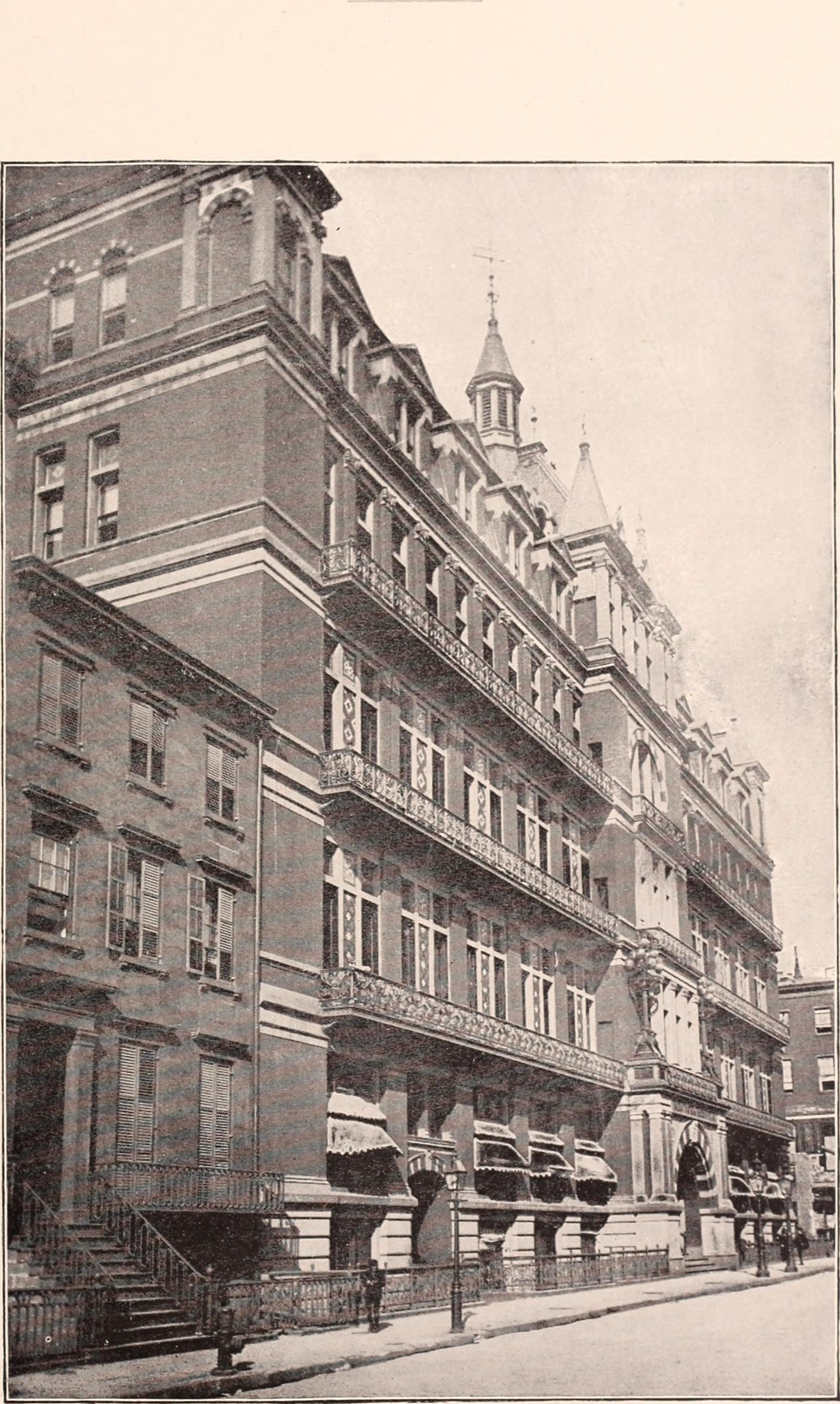
New York Hospital in 1893

=== 20th century ===
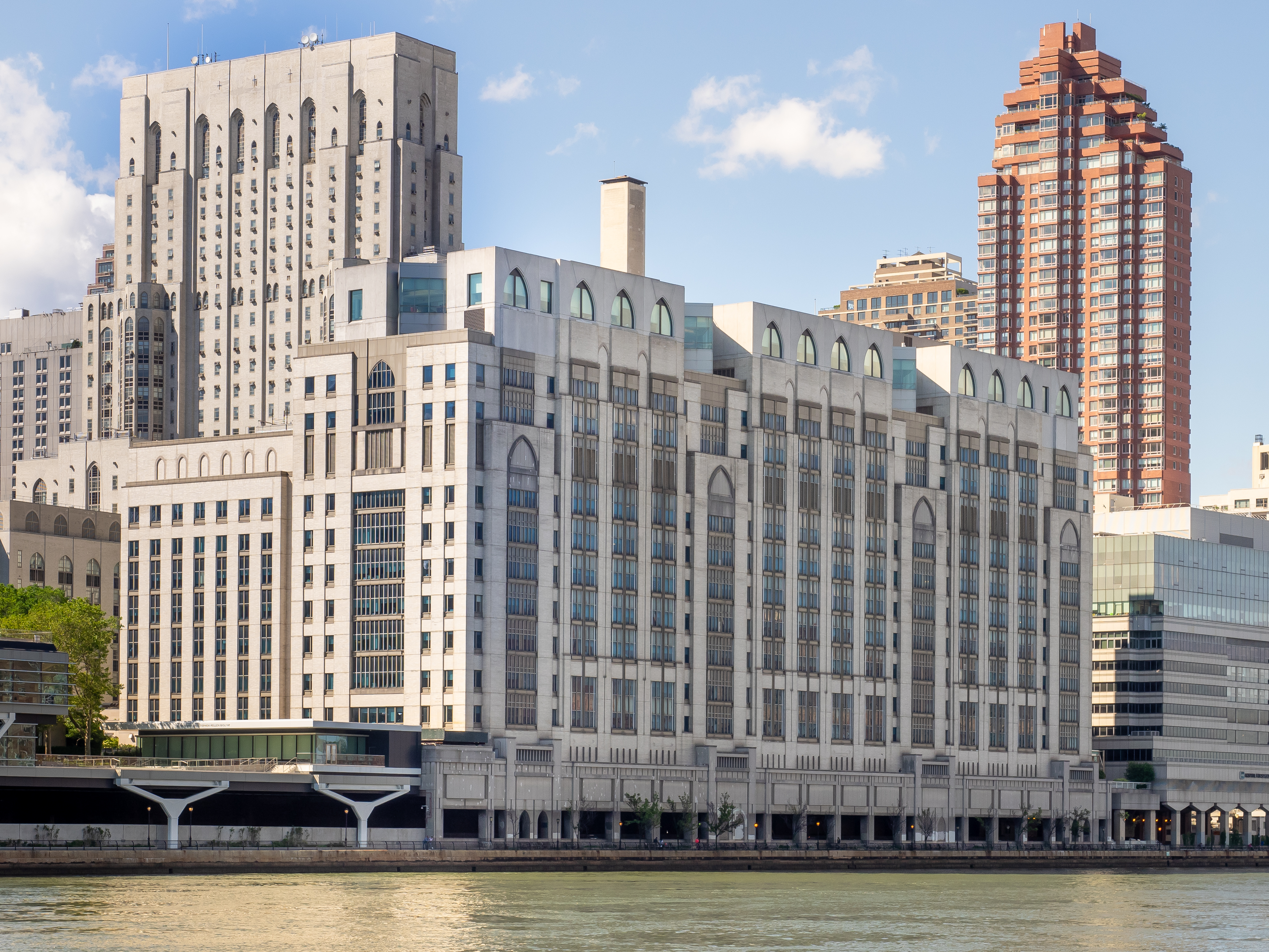
Weill Cornell Medical Center from the East River

In 1912, New York Hospital became affiliated with the Cornell University Medical College.

In 1932, the hospital moved to a new location as a joint facility, the New York Hospital-Cornell Medical Center, now Weill Cornell Medical Center, on York Avenue between East 68th and 70th Streets.

In 1998, New York Hospital merged administratively with Presbyterian Hospital to become NewYork–Presbyterian Hospital (NYP). Despite the clinical alliance, the faculty and instructional functions of the Cornell and Columbia medical school units remain largely distinct and independent. Each hospital in the NewYork–Presbyterian Healthcare System is affiliated with one of the two colleges.

The York Avenue site functions as one of the six NYP campuses.

== Komansky Children's Hospital ==
In 2005, Komansky Children's Hospital was established at Weill Cornell Medical Center through philanthropic giving from American finance executive David Komansky for whom the hospital is named.

Komansky Children's Hospital is a pediatric acute care hospital located within Weill Cornell Medical Center. The hospital has 103 beds and is affiliated with Weill Cornell Medicine and is a member of New York-Presbyterian Hospital. The hospital provides comprehensive pediatric specialties and subspecialties to pediatric patients aged 0–21 throughout New York City.

The hospital is certified as a Level II Trauma Center and houses the only pediatric burn unit in the New York City Metropolitan Area. Komansky Children's Hospital is a full-service pediatric hospital within a hospital and has been routinely listed by U.S. News & World Report's as one of the nation's best children's hospitals. It is one of only ten children's hospitals in the nation to be ranked by U.S. News & World Report in all ten clinical specialties.

== Notable births, hospitalizations, and deaths ==
=== Births ===
- George Carlin, comedian and writer
- Caroline Kennedy, U.S. ambassador to Australia and daughter of former U.S. president John F. Kennedy
- Rose Schlossberg, granddaughter of former U.S. president John F. Kennedy
- Tatiana Schlossberg, granddaughter of former U.S. president John F. Kennedy
- Sean Lennon, musician and son of John Lennon and Yoko Ono
- Jay Rockefeller, former U.S. Senator
- Prince Constantine Alexios of Greece and Denmark, son of Pavlos, Crown Prince of Greece
- Princess Maria-Olympia of Greece and Denmark, daughter of Pavlos, Crown Prince of Greece
- Prince Achileas-Andreas of Greece and Denmark, son of Pavlos, Crown Prince of Greece
- Princess Leonore, Duchess of Gotland, daughter of Princess Madeleine of Sweden, Duchess of Hälsingland and Gästrikland

=== Hospitalizations ===
- Lauren Manning, author and September 11 attacks victim
- Mohammad Reza Pahlavi, the last Shah of Iran

=== Deaths ===
- Arthur Ashe, professional tennis player
- Robert Atkins, physician who developed the Atkins diet
- Emil N. Baar, New York Supreme Court justice
- Peaches Browning, actress
- Yul Brynner, actor
- Cy Coleman, composer
- Jessica Dragonette, singer
- Nora Ephron, writer and filmmaker
- Constance Ford, actress and model
- Frederic Franklin, choreographer
- Greta Garbo, actress
- Elisabeth Irwin, founder of the Little Red School House
- Judith Jamison, dancer and choreographer
- Gertrude Lawrence, actress
- Rue McClanahan, actress
- Lester del Rey, science fiction author
- Gloria Swanson, actress
- Robert A. Taft, former U.S. Senator
- Andy Warhol, artist and film director
- Maurice Tempelsman, businessman

== See also ==
- 1788 Doctors' riot
- Cornell University
- List of the oldest hospitals in the United States
