= NewYork-Presbyterian Brooklyn Methodist Hospital =

- NewYork-Presbyterian Healthcare System
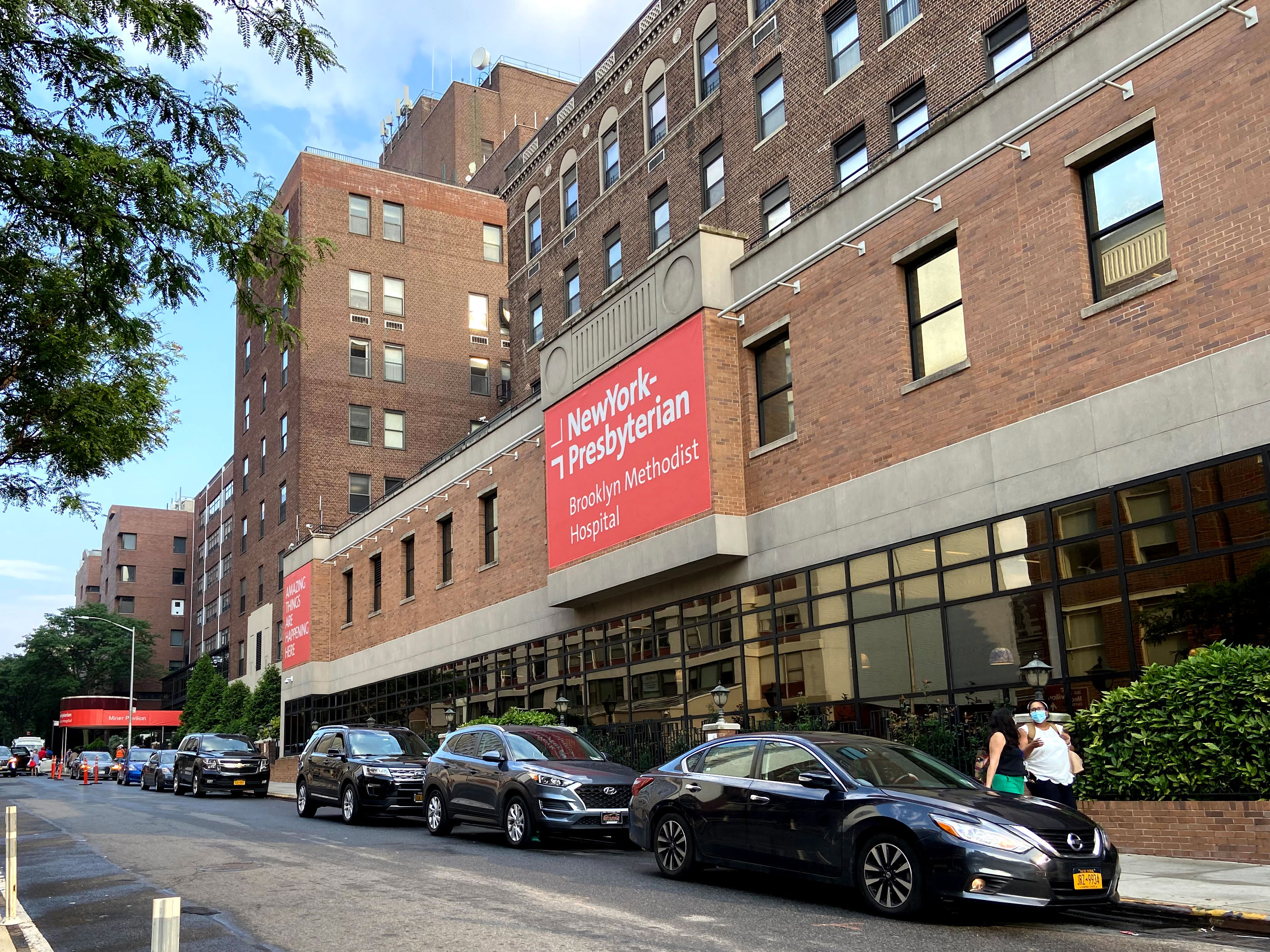
- New York Methodist Hospital in Park Slope, Brooklyn.

Geography
- Location: 506 6th St, Brooklyn, New York City, New York, United States
- Coordinates: 40°40′03″N 73°58′43″W

Organization
- Affiliated university: Cornell University - Weill Cornell Medical College
- Network: NewYork-Presbyterian Healthcare System

Services
- Emergency department: Level II Trauma Center
- Beds: 591 (including bassinets)

History
- Founded: May 27, 1881

Links
- Website: www.nyp.org/brooklyn
- Lists: Hospitals in New York State
- Other links: Hospitals in Brooklyn

NewYork-Presbyterian Brooklyn Methodist Hospital is located in Park Slope in Brooklyn, New York, between 7th and 8th Avenues, on 6th Street. The academic hospital has 591 beds (including bassinets) and provides services to some 42,000 inpatients each year. In addition, approximately 500,000 outpatient visits and services are logged annually.

== Services ==
New York-Presbyterian Brooklyn Methodist Hospital offers specialized care in the following areas: advanced and minimally invasive surgery, advanced otolaryngology, asthma and lung disease, cancer care, cardiology and cardiac surgery, diabetes and other endocrine disorders, digestive and liver disorders, healthy aging, neurosciences, orthopedic medicine and surgery, vascular medicine and surgery, and women's health.

== Affiliations ==
NewYork–Presbyterian Brooklyn Methodist Hospital is affiliated with Weill Cornell Medicine and is a teaching hospital for SUNY Downstate College of Medicine.

== History ==
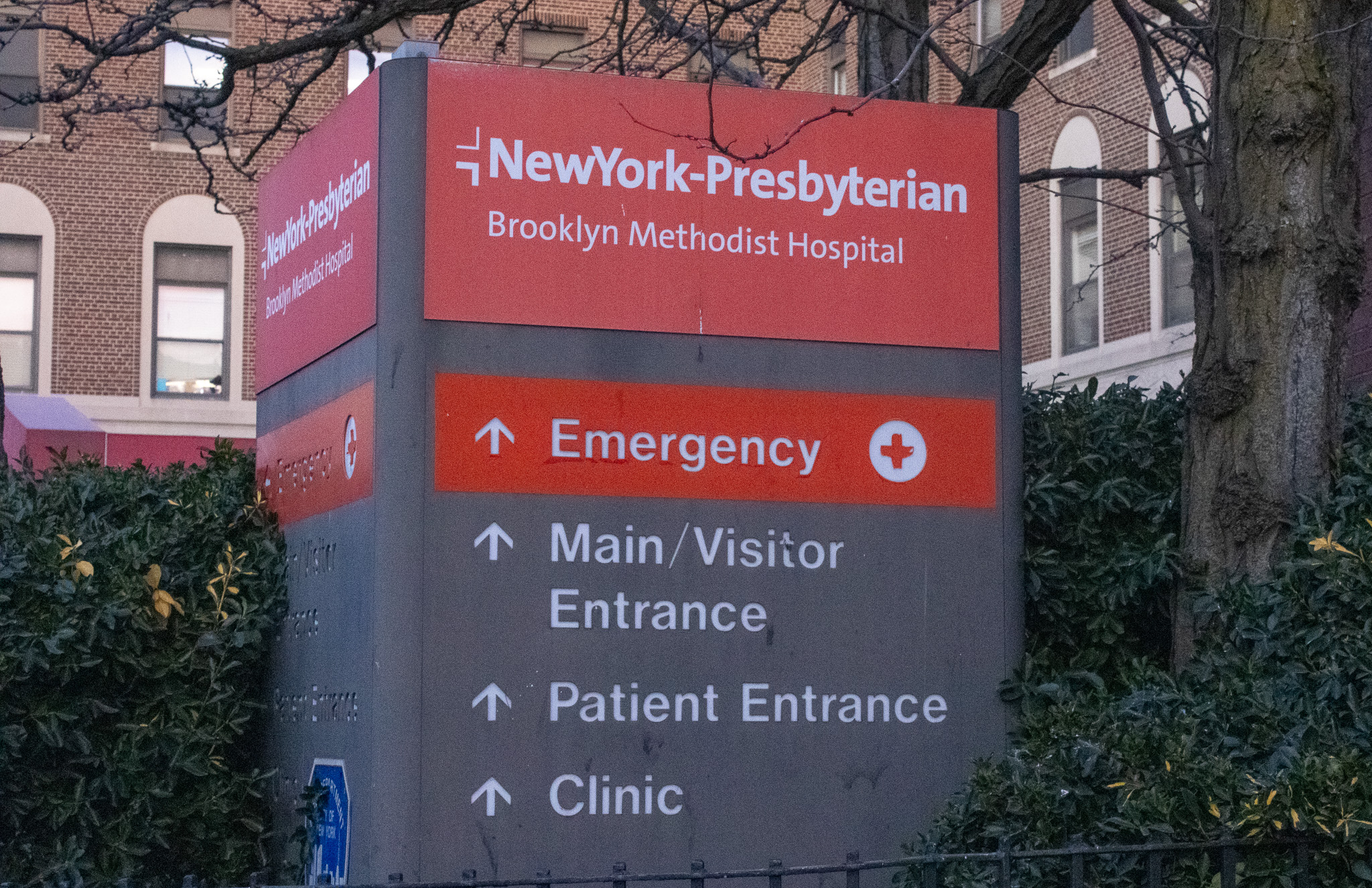
The NewYork-Presbyterian Brooklyn Methodist Hospital in Park Slope, Brooklyn, New York

Founded in 1881, NewYork-Presbyterian Brooklyn Methodist Hospital was the first Methodist hospital in the country. The original Romanesque Revival-style building was replaced in the 1930s.

On December 16, 1960, a mid-air collision over Staten Island left 134 people dead; one of the two aircraft that had collided crashed in Park Slope in Brooklyn. The only initial survivor, Stephen Baltz, an 11-year-old boy from Illinois, was thrown from that aircraft onto a snowbank. Badly burned and having inhaled burning fuel, he was taken to what was then Brooklyn's Methodist Hospital, where he succumbed to pneumonia the next day. A plaque inside the hospital’s chapel commemorates the event, including the 65¢ that were found in the boy’s pocket upon arrival.

In 1993, New York Methodist Hospital became one of the earliest hospitals to join the New York Hospital Care Network and its affiliated medical school, Cornell University Medical College. The affiliation continued after New York Hospital merged with Presbyterian Hospital in 1998 to form the present-day NewYork–Presbyterian Healthcare System.

In 2014, the hospital announced plans to construct a new ambulatory care building on property already owned by the facility. A local community group, Preserve Park Slope, filed a lawsuit to overturn a decision by the New York City Board of Standards and Appeals to approve plans for the building. Construction began on the $445 million project in 2016 despite vigorous community opposition. The construction and additional renovations were meant to address overcrowding issues, particularly after the closure of the nearby Long Island College Hospital.

On December 16, 2016, the hospital renewed the affiliation with NYP by changing its name to NewYork-Presbyterian Brooklyn Methodist Hospital. This would allow more direct investment from NYP for much-needed renovations and access to specialty care.

On March 15, 2021, NYP opened the Center for Community Health, a six-story ambulatory care center located on 6th Street in Park Slope. This is the first major outpatient care center built in Brooklyn in 40 years.
