= David Komansky =

American businessman and CEO of Merrill Lynch (1939–2021)

- Born: David Herman Komansky; April 27, 1939; Manhattan, New York, U.S.
- Died: September 27, 2021 (aged 82); New York City, U.S.
- Occupation: Banker
- Known for: Chief executive officer of Merrill Lynch & Company
- Children: 2

David Herman Komansky (April 27, 1939 – September 27, 2021) was an American banker who was chairman and chief executive officer of Merrill Lynch & Company.

== Early life and education ==
Komansky was born in 1939 in Manhattan, the son of William Komansky (1901–1975), a Ukrainian Jew who emigrated from Odesa as a child. His mother, Mae Rachel Burke, was Irish Catholic. His maternal grandparents emigrated from Ireland.

He served in the U.S. Coast Guard, and then attended the University of Miami School of Business at the University of Miami in 1965. He dropped out of college without obtaining a degree. He later completed the highly selective Advanced Management Program for senior executives at Harvard University.

== Career ==
In 1968, Komansky joined Merrill Lynch as a broker. He became a regional director in 1981 and an executive vice president in 1990. He served as president and chief operating officer from January 1995 to April 1997, as chief executive officer from December 1996 to December 2002, and as chairman from April 1997 until his retirement following the company's annual meeting on April 28, 2003.

He served as a director of BlackRock and as a member of the international advisory board of the British American Business Council. He was also a member of the board of directors of London-based WPP plc, a business conglomerate. In 2001, he was appointed to the board of trustees of NewYork-Presbyterian Hospital in New York City.

=== Philanthropy ===
In July 2005, a gift from Komansky and his wife, Phyllis, funded the establishment of the Phyllis and David Komansky Center for Children's Health at NewYork-Presbyterian Hospital/Weill Cornell Medical Center.

== Personal life ==
Komansky was married to Phyllis Komansky. They had two daughters, Jennifer and Elyssa.

== Death ==
He died on September 27, 2021, in New York City, at age 82.
