= Noah Williams (economist) =

American economist

Noah William

Academic background
- Education: University of Chicago

Noah Williams is an American economist and professor of economics at the Miami Herbert Business School at the University of Miami. He previously was a professor of economics at the University of Wisconsin-Madison.

Williams earned his Ph.D. and B.A. in economics from the University of Chicago. He is also an adjunct fellow at the Manhattan Institute for Policy Research.
