= Ralph Alvarez =

Cuban-American businessman

Ralph Álvarez
- Born: 1955 (age 69–70); Cuba
- Education: Miami Herbert Business School, University of Miami (BBA)

Ralph Álvarez (born 1955) is a Cuban American businessman, an operating partner at Advent International, a large global private equity firm, and a member of the board of directors of Eli Lilly and Company. He is the former president and chief operations officer of McDonald's.

== Early life and education ==
Álvarez was born in Cuba. In 1976, he earned a bachelor's degree in business administration from the University of Miami School of Business at the University of Miami.

== Career ==
Álvarez began his career in various leadership positions with Burger King and Wendy's. In 1994, he joined McDonald's, where he served as president of McDonald's Mexico. in 1998, he was forced out of McDonald's following allegations of having an affair with a subordinate.

In January 2004, he returned to McDonald's as president and chief operations officer of McDonald's USA and later, from January 2005 to August 2006, as president of McDonald's North America. Citing chronic knee pain, Álvarez announced his retirement from McDonald's effective December 31, 2009. He was previously rehired and given a second chance after being forced out in 1998 for having an affair with a subordinate.

In 2009, he was appointed a member of the board of directors of Eli Lilly and Company, a Fortune 500 global pharmaceutical corporation. He also serves as a member of the board of directors at Lowe’s Companies, Traeger, Inc., First Watch Restaurant Group, and several private companies. He previously served on the boards of McDonald’s Corporation, Realogy Holdings, KeyCorp, Dunkin’ Brands Group, Inc., and Skylark Co., Ltd.

In July 2017, he became an operating partner at Advent International, a large global private equity firm.
