= University of Miami Business School =

Business school of the University of Miami

Coordinates: 25.721644°N 80.279267°W

- Former names: University of Miami Patti and Allan Herbert Business School; University of Miami School of Business Administration
- Type: Private business school
- Established: 1929
- Parent institution: University of Miami
- Accreditation: Triple accreditation
- Dean: Paul A. Pavlou
- Faculty: 170 (full-time)
- Students: 4,580
- Undergraduates: 3,674
- Postgraduates: 906
- Location: Coral Gables, Florida, U.S.
- Campus: Suburban
- Website: herbert.miami.edu

The University of Miami Business School is the business school of the University of Miami, a private university in Coral Gables, Florida, United States. The school was founded in 1929 and offers undergraduate BBA, full-time MBA, Executive MBA, MS, Ph.D., and non-degree executive education programs. It is one of 12 schools and colleges at the University of Miami. From 2019 to 2026, it was known as the University of Miami Patti and Allan Herbert Business School, often shortened to Miami Herbert Business School.

== History ==
=== 20th century ===
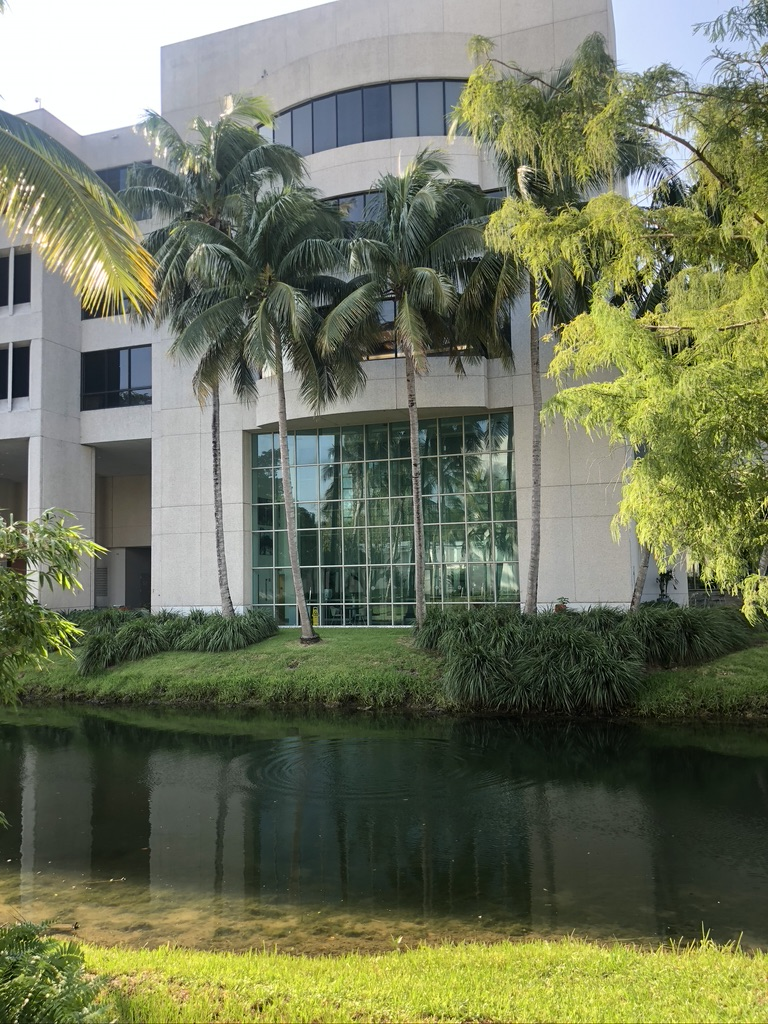
Miami Herbert Business School on the University of Miami campus in September 2020

The University of Miami School of Business was founded with the University of Miami's founding in 1929. The school's founding came in during a period of financial turmoil for the university, and classes were initially held in the unfinished Anastasia Hotel, near the parcel of land that would later become the university's Coral Gables campus.

=== 21st century ===
In 2017, University of Miami president Julio Frenk appointed former Harvard Business School senior associate dean and professor John Quelch as the school's dean and vice provost of executive education. Shortly after being hired, Quelch led a successful but short-lived initiative to change the school's name from the University of Miami School of Business Administration to Miami Business School.

On October 15, 2019, the school's name changed again to honor Patti and Allan Herbert, a married alumni couple who contributed approximately $100 million to the university over the course of their lifetimes. The school was known as the University of Miami Patti and Allan Herbert Business School. In 2026, the school announced it would return to the name University of Miami Business School as "Allan Herbert's passing created a change in circumstances that led the Herbert family and the University to mutually agree to revisit the Herberts' philanthropic commitments, redirecting them to student scholarships".

In December 2022, the University of Miami announced the departure of Quelch as the school's dean, and the appointment of Ann N. Olazabal, a professor of business law and ethics and the Business School's vice dean of Lifelong Learning and Executive Education, as his interim replacement. In January 2023, the university began a search for a permanent replacement. On July 1, 2024, Paul A. Pavlou, formerly dean of the University of Houston's business school, began his tenure as the school's new dean.

== Academics ==
=== Undergraduate ===
Miami Business School offers two undergraduate business education degrees, a Bachelor of Business Administration and a Bachelor of Science in Business Administration. The school offers 17 majors and 18 minors in specific academic disciplines.

=== Graduate ===
Miami Business School's MBA includes a full-time program, two accelerated options (an MBA and a specialty MBA in Real Estate), an online Professional MBA, and an Executive MBA (EMBA) designed for working professionals. Graduate students may also pursue several joint interdisciplinary degrees, including a JD-MBA, a PhD-MBA, and a Master of Science in Sustainable Business. Miami Business School also operates a program in collaboration with the university's School of Architecture leading to a joint Bachelor of Architecture-MBA degree. All graduate programs emphasize experiential learning with students graded on portfolios they develop in their coursework.

Miami Business School also offers a joint M.D.-MBA degree in conjunction with the University of Miami's Miller School of Medicine.

== Accreditations ==
Miami Business School is accredited by the Southern Association of Colleges and Schools Commission on Colleges and AACSB International. Its healthcare management program is accredited by the Commission on the Accreditation of Healthcare Management Education. The school received EQUIS accreditation from the European Foundation for Management Development in May 2021. Miami Business School is also a member of Graduate Management Admission Council.

== Rankings ==
Business school rankings

United States
- Bloomberg MBA: 58
- USNWR MBA: 50

Global
- Financial Times MBA: 93

=== Undergraduate program ===
As of 2022, Academic Ranking of World Universities ranks Miami Business School the 25th-best university in the world for business administration. As of 2025, Bloomberg Businessweek ranked Miami Business School the 49th-best business school in the nation. As of 2022, Poets and Quants ranks Miami Business School 30th-best nationally and the best in Florida. As of its 2023 rankings, the collegiate ranking company Niche ranks Miami Business School's accounting and finance programs 14th-best in the nation.

=== Graduate program ===
As of 2026, Miami Business School's graduate program is ranked at 39 on the Best Business School list by U.S. News & World Report, tied with BYU Marriot, UoF Warrington, and UoU David Eccles. In 2022, the program was ranked as 52nd-best nationally by Poets & Quants. In 2021, Financial Times ranked the school's MBA program the 93rd-best MBA program in the world. Also in 2021, The Economist ranked the Miami Business School MBA program the 77th-best MBA program in the world and 34th-best in the nation. In 2021, The Economist ranked Miami Business School's MBA faculty the eighth-best MBA faculty in the world.

== Notable alumni ==
- Ralph Alvarez, operating member, Advent International, and former president of McDonald's North America
- Mercedes Aráoz, former Vice President of Peru and Minister of Economy and Finance
- Micky Arison, chairman of Carnival Corporation and owner of the Miami Heat (attended but did not graduate)
- Bakr bin Laden, former chairman of Saudi Binladin Group and half-brother of al-Qaeda terrorist Osama bin Laden
- Juan Carlos Escotet, Spanish-Venezuelan billionaire banker and founder of Banesco, Venezuela's largest private financial institution
- Lyor Cohen, global head of music for Google and YouTube
- John W. Creighton Jr., former president and chief executive officer of Weyerhaeuser and UAL Corporation
- Mario Cristobal, head football coach for the University of Miami
- Alix Earle, social media personality
- Dany Garcia, former chairwoman and owner of XFL professional football league, film producer, and former wife and manager of Dwayne Johnson
- Patti and Allan Herbert, philanthropists
- Michael Johns, health care executive and former White House presidential speechwriter
- David Komansky, former chairman and chief executive officer of Merrill Lynch
- Porfirio Lobo Sosa, former President of Honduras
- Rohan Marley, co-founder of Jamaica-based Jammin Java and son of late reggae musician Bob Marley
- Jorge Mas, chief executive officer of MasTec and chairman of the Cuban American National Foundation
- Dan Radakovich, athletic director at the University of Miami
- Mark Richt, ACC Network college football analyst and former University of Miami head football coach
- Drew Rosenhaus, professional sports agent, National Football League
- Matthew Rubel, former chairman, chief executive officer, and president of Payless ShoeSource
- Andy Unanue, managing partner of AUA Private Equity Partners and former chief operations officer of Goya Foods
- Martin Zweig, former investment advisor and author of Winning on Wall Street

== Notable past and present faculty ==
- Alex Azar, senior executive in residence
- Henrik Cronqvist, former vice dean and professor, finance
- Aquiles Este, lecturer, brand management
- Yadong Luo, professor of international business strategy
- Linda L. Neider, professor and chair, Department of Management
- John Quelch, former dean
- Donna Shalala, University of Miami board of trustees presidential chairperson and professor emeritus
- Neil Wallace, former professor, economics
- Noah Williams, professor of economics
