= Matthew Rubel =

American entrepreneur and investor (born 1957)

Matthew E. Rubel
- Born: November 29, 1957 (age 68); Fort Lauderdale, Florida, U.S.
- Education: Ohio University (BS), University of Miami (MS)
- Occupations: Entrepreneur and investor
- Known for: Former president of Collective Brands, Inc.
- Children: 3

Matthew E. Rubel (born November 29, 1957) is an American entrepreneur and investor. He is the former chairman, chief executive officer, and president of Collective Brands, Inc., the parent company for Payless ShoeSource, a footwear, accessory, and lifestyle brand company, Collective Brands' Performance + Lifestyles Group (formerly Stride Rite Corporation), and Collective Licensing International.

== Early life and education ==
Rubel was born in Fort Lauderdale, Florida. He attended Ohio University, where he obtained a Bachelor of Science in 1979. He then obtained an MBA from the University of Miami School of Business in 1980.

== Career ==
Rubel started his career at Bonwit Teller in New York City, and later became executive vice president of Murjani International Ltd., where he was in charge of all Tommy Hilfiger businesses.

After leaving Murjani, Rubel was president and chief executive officer of Pepe Jeans USA and managed Revlon Inc.'s prestige cosmetic brands as president of the Specialty Store Division. From 1994 to 1999, he was executive vice president of J. Crew Group and the CEO of Popular Club Plan. In November 1998, he led the sale of Popular Club from J. Crew to Fingerhut, the largest independent direct marketer in the United States. While at J. Crew, Rubel handled all licensing and international and brand marketing.

From 1999 to 2005, Rubel was chairman, president, and chief executive officer of Cole Haan, a marketer of men's and women's shoes and accessories and a subsidiary of Nike, Inc. At Cole Haan, Rubel led a multi-year turnaround, and guided the company into a new era by re-energizing the brand and creating a strong global presence.

Rubel joined Payless ShoeSource in June 2005. In July 2007, Rubel led the acquisition of The Stride Rite Corporation and the formation of Collective Brands, Inc. (NYSE: PSS), the parent company of Payless ShoeSource, Collective Brands Performance + Lifestyle Group and Collective Licensing International.

In December 2007, Footwear News named Rubel their 2007 "Person of the Year" in recognition of his leadership in forming Collective Brands and establishing the company's vision of creating the preeminent, consumer-centric, global footwear, accessories and lifestyle brand company, reaching customers through multiple price points and selling channels. The year prior, Footwear News awarded Payless its "Marketer of the Year" award in recognition of its turnaround effort under Rubel's leadership. In April 2008, Rubel received the M.B. Zale Visionary Merchant Award from Texas A&M University.

In 2011, Rubel resigned from Collective Brands and joined TPG Capital as a senior advisor. In 2015, Rubel left TPG to join Roark Capital as a senior advisor, before joining Varsity Brands as chief executive officer. Rubel left Varsity Brands in early 2017.

== Other positions ==
Rubel is active in several industry and civic organizations, including the Advisory Council for Trade Policy Negotiation, which provides counsel to The White House and USTR, the Jay H. Baker Center at the Wharton School of the University of Pennsylvania in Philadelphia, the Young Presidents' Organization, and the President's Council at his alma mater, the University of Miami. He is chairman of the Footwear Distributors and Retailers of America and a member of the American Ballet Theatre board of governing trustees and the International Council of Shopping Centers board of trustees.

He is a board member for SuperValu, HSNi, Hudson's Bay Company, A.T. Cross Pen, and Edible Communities.
