= Emil N. Baar =

Emil N. Baar (September 9, 1891 – November 13, 1985) was a former justice on the New York Supreme Court and a leader in Reform Judaism.

== Biography ==
Originally from Vienna, Baar came to the United States with his family when he was two years old. He grew up in Brooklyn and received his A.B. from Columbia College in 1913 and law degree from Columbia Law School in 1915.

In 1926, he joined the firm of Baar & Bennett, where he remained a partner until his death. In 1951, he was appointed to the Supreme Court of New York. In 1955, Baar became a special assistant to the New York Attorney General Jacob Javits, defending the constitutionality of emergency commercial- and business-rent control laws the state adopted in 1945.

From 1959 to 1963, he served as chairman of the Union of American Hebrew Congregations (UAHC) and was made honorary lifetime chairman in 1964. A moderate Republican, Baar was a supporter of civil rights, opposed the war in Vietnam, and admitted a gay congregation into the UAHC.

From 1966 to 1972, he served as president of the Jewish Braille Institute. He was also an officer for organizations including the National Conference of Christians and Jews, the Brooklyn Jewish Hospital and Medical Center, UJA-Federation of New York, the Brooklyn Museum and the Hebrew Union College-Jewish Institute.

Baar died on November 13, 1985, at New York Hospital at 94 years old.
