= NewYork-Presbyterian Healthcare System =

Hospital network in New York state

NewYork-Presbyterian Healthcare
- Industry: Healthcare
- Founded: 1993
- Headquarters: 21 Audubon Ave, New York City, U.S., United States
- Area served: New York metropolitan area
- Number of employees: 47,000
- Website: nyp.org

The NewYork-Presbyterian Healthcare System is a network of independent, cooperating, acute-care and community hospitals, continuum-of-care facilities, home-health agencies, ambulatory sites, and specialty institutes in the New York metropolitan area. As of 2014, the System was the largest receiver of Medicare payments in the United States.

The system is run by New York-Presbyterian Hospital, Columbia University Vagelos College of Physicians and Surgeons, and Weill Cornell Medicine.

Each hospital in the system is an affiliate of one of the two medical colleges.

To become a part of the system, institutions must meet standards of the organization and to remain in it, "each must continue to pursue a quality agenda, which includes review and evaluation of clinical, operational, and financial data," according to the Web site of the organization. Member institutions share their knowledge and expertise, including knowledge of best practices in various fields.

== List of hospitals in the system ==
These hospitals, in addition to NewYork-Presbyterian Hospital and its connected hospitals, are in the system:

=== New York City ===
- Gracie Square Hospital in Manhattan, New York
- Hospital for Special Surgery in Manhattan, New York (Cornell)
- Lower Manhattan Hospital in Manhattan, New York (Cornell)
- NewYork-Presbyterian Brooklyn Methodist Hospital in the Park Slope section of Brooklyn, New York
- NewYork-Presbyterian/Queens in Queens, New York
- Morgan Stanley Children's Hospital in Manhattan, New York

=== New York state ===
- Helen Hayes Hospital in Haverstraw, New York (Columbia)
- Lawrence Hospital Center in Bronxville, New York (Columbia)
- Mary Imogene Bassett Hospital in Cooperstown, New York (Columbia)
- Hudson Valley Hospital in Cortlandt Manor, New York
- Westchester Division in White Plains, New York

== Long-term care institutions in the system ==
- Amsterdam Nursing Home
- Fort Tryon Center For Rehabilitation And Nursing
- Franklin Center For Rehabilitation And Nursing
- Freidwald Center For Rehabilitation And Nursing
- Manhattanville Health Care Center
- Menorah Home and Hospital
- New York United Hospital Medical Center Skilled Nursing Pavilion
- St. Barnabas Nursing Home
- St. Mary's Hospital for Children
- Shore View Nursing Home
- The Silvercrest Center For Nursing and Rehabilitation
- Tandet Center for Continuing Care (part of Stamford Hospital)

== Specialty institutes in the system ==
- Community Healthcare Network
- Gracie Square Hospital
- Helen Hayes Hospital
- New York College of Podiatric Medicine & Foot Clinics of New York
- The Rogosin Institute
