= Gracie Square Hospital =

- NewYork-Presbyterian Healthcare System

Geography
- Location: 420 East 76th Street, on the Upper East Side, Manhattan, New York City, New York, United States
- Coordinates: 40.769794°N 73.952856°W

Services
- Beds: 140

History
- Founded: 1958-1959

Links
- Website: www.nygsh.org
- Lists: Hospitals in New York State

Gracie Square Hospital is an inpatient psychiatric hospital located at 420 East 76th Street on the Upper East Side of Manhattan, in New York City.

The hospital was built and founded by Cynthia Zirinsky, a mental health care professional, and her husband Richard Zirinsky, a New York City real-estate developer in 1958-1959.

== About ==
The hospital has 140 beds for inpatient treatment, as well as specialized care programs such as the Young Adult Care Program with College Track, the Mood Disorders Program, the LGBTQ+ Care Program, the Asian Psychiatry Program, the Older Adult Care Program and geriatric psychiatry, drug rehabilitation, and Ketamine Infusion therapy.

The hospital had 220 beds when it opened in 1958-1959. The hospital is a member of the NewYork-Presbyterian Healthcare System.

== Notable patients ==
- Eddie Fisher, American singer
- Anthony Hecht, American poet
- Audra McDonald, American actress and singer
- Thelonious Monk, American jazz pianist and composer
- Phil Ochs, American protest singer and songwriter
- Paul Robeson, American singer, actor, and political activist
- Edie Sedgwick, American actress, model, socialite.
