= NewYork-Presbyterian Hudson Valley Hospital =

Geography
- Location: 1980 Crompond Road, Cortlandt Manor, New York, United States
- Coordinates: 41.2925243°N 73.8929404°W

Organization
- Care system: Public
- Type: General
- Affiliated university: NewYork-Presbyterian Hospital

Services
- Beds: 128

History
- Founded: 1889

Links
- Website: nyp.org/hudsonvalley
- Lists: Hospitals in New York State

NewYork-Presbyterian Hudson Valley Hospital, frequently referred to as Hudson Valley Hospital or simply NYP/HVH, is an accredited non-profit hospital with 350 physicians and 1,300 employees in Cortlandt Manor, New York.

== History ==
Hudson Valley Hospital was first founded in 1889 by the Helping Hands Association in the City of Peekskill after a group of women raised $1,800 to purchase property on lower South Street.

The hospital was known as the Helping Hand Hospital until 1911 when it was incorporated as Peekskill Hospital. Later, in 1966 the hospital moved to its current location in Cortlandt Manor and was renamed Hudson Valley Hospital in 1992.

The hospital expanded in 2014 to include a Cancer Center and Emergency Department, among other additions to the infrastructure.

== Specialties & Awards ==
HVHC leverages 3D mammography technology for breast imaging. HVHC has earned the "Baby Friendly" status from the Baby Friendly Hospital Initiative.
