= Linda L. Neider =

American professor of management

- Born: Syracuse, New York, U.S.
- Occupation: Professor

Academic background
- Education: B.A. M.A. M.B.A. Ph.D., Psychology
- Alma mater: Daemen College; State University of New York at Buffalo
- Thesis: An experimental field investigation utilizing expectancy theory of motivation

Linda L. Neider is professor of management at the University of Miami School of Business, where she chairs the Department of Management and holds a secondary appointment at the Department of Health Management and Policy. She was elected Chair of the Faculty Senate for the University of Miami in 2019.

Neider has conducted research in the areas related to leadership. She has focused on leadership and organizational effectiveness training, organizational culture assessment, executive coaching, performance appraisal systems and organizational needs assessment. She has co-authored or edited eleven books on management topics.

in 2017, Neider was the recipient of the Outstanding Service Award from the Miami Herbert Business School at the University of Miami. In 2020, she was awarded the University of Miami's May A. Brunson Award for "contributions to improve the status of women at the University of Miami, that are outside of their job or title responsibility."

== Education ==
Neider graduated summa cum laude from Daemen University in 1975. She then attended the State University of New York at Buffalo, where she received her M.A. degree (Psychology) in 1978, and both an MBA and Ph.D. degree in the following year.

== Career ==
After completing her doctoral studies, Neider joined the University of Miami's Department of Management as an assistant professor in 1979. She was tenured and promoted to associate professor in 1983 and became a professor of organizational behavior in 1990.

At the University of Miami, Neider was the Vice Dean for Faculty at the School of Business Administration from 1989 until 1992. She was the first female department chair at Miami Herbert Business School, serving as chair from 1986 until 1990 and again from 1992 until 2007. In 2017, she was appointed the department Chair again.

=== Research ===
Neider's research revolves around leadership and organizational effectiveness training, organizational change, development, and culture, human resource systems, and survey design, development and analysis, along with performance appraisal systems, and training and development needs assessment.

Neider has conducted a majority of her research on leadership and related topics. She studied leader-member exchange (LMX) and in 1992, published a paper presenting a new 6-itemed LMX scale named as LMX-6. She re-examined the Ohio state leadership study, conducted in the 1970s, and discussed the variations in the results, along with discussing the implications for leadership theory and research.

Neider has developed and validated a new measure for authentic leadership, known as the Authentic Leadership Inventory (ALI).

== Awards and honors ==
- 2017 - Outstanding Service Award, University of Miami School of Business
- 2020 - May A Brunson Award, University of Miami Women's Commission

== Bibliography ==
=== Selected books ===
- The Human Relations of Organizations (1987) ISBN 978-0534074104
- New directions in Human Resource Management (2003) ISBN 978-1607529194
- Understanding and Managing Teams (2005)
- Power and Influence in Organizations: New Empirical and Theoretical Perspectives (2006) ISBN 978-1593114695
- Affect and Emotion: New Directions in Management Theory and Research (2008)
- The Dark Side of Management (2010) ISBN 978-1607522645
- Trust and Justice Relations in Organizations (2012)
- Advances in Authentic and Ethical Leadership (2014) ISBN 978-1623967208
- Current Theory and Research in Transforming Organizations (2016) ISBN 978-1681236131

=== Selected articles ===
- Neider, L. L., & Schriesheim, C. A. (2011). The authentic leadership inventory (ALI): Development and empirical tests. The leadership quarterly, 22(6), 1146–1164.
- Schriesheim, C. A., & Neider, L. L. (1996). Path-goal leadership theory: The long and winding road. The Leadership Quarterly, 7(3), 317–321.
- Schriesheim, C. A., Cogliser, C. C., & Neider, L. L. (1995). Is it “trustworthy”? A multiple-levels-of-analysis reexamination of an Ohio State leadership study, with implications for future research. The Leadership Quarterly, 6(2), 111–145.
- Schriesheim, C. A., Neider, L. L., & Scandura, T. A. (1998). Delegation and leader-member exchange: Main effects, moderators, and measurement issues. Academy of Management Journal, 41(3), 298–318.
- Neider, L. (1987). A preliminary investigation of female entrepreneurs in Florida. Journal of small business management, 25(3), 22.
