= John Quelch (academic) =

American academic (born 1951)

John Quelch CBE
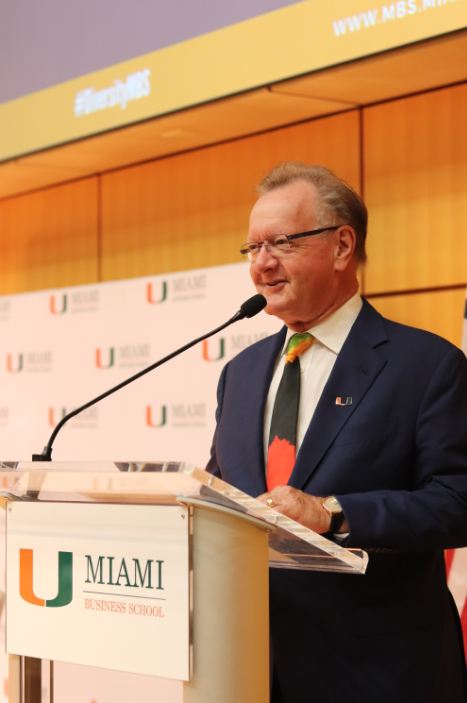

4th Executive Vice Chancellor of Duke Kunshan University
- Incumbent
- Assumed office 1 January 2024
- Preceded by: Alfred Bloom; Jennifer Francis (interim); Mary Frances Luce (interim)

Personal details
- Born: 8 August 1951 (age 75) London, England
- Education: Exeter College, Oxford (BA, MA); University of Pennsylvania (MBA); Harvard University (MS, DBA)

John Anthony Quelch CBE (born 8 August 1951) is a British-American academic and professor. Quelch is the executive vice chancellor of Duke Kunshan University in Kunshan, China. He is the former dean of the University of Miami School of Business at the University of Miami in Coral Gables, Florida from 2017 to 2022.

He also served as the University of Miami's Leonard M. Miller university chair professor, its vice provost for executive education, the Charles Edward Wilson professor of business administration emeritus at Harvard Business School, and dean emeritus of the China Europe International Business School in Shanghai.

== Early life and education ==
Quelch was born in London, son of a Royal Air Force officer and a nurse. He began his education at a one-room schoolhouse in the Isle of Man, attended primary school in Australia, then returned to England, settling in Norwich and enrolling in Town Close School and later Norwich School.

He received his Bachelor of Arts and Master of Arts from Exeter College, Oxford, where he was an open scholar in modern history. At Oxford, he edited the student newspaper Cherwell. As a Thouron Scholar, Quelch earned a Master of Business Administration from the Wharton School at the University of Pennsylvania. He then received a Master of Science degree from the Harvard School of Public Health and a Doctor of Business Administration from Harvard Business School.

== Career ==
Quelch's first position in academia was as a visiting instructor at the University of Hawaiʻi. He was next appointed assistant professor at the School of Business Administration, now the Ivey Business School, at the University of Western Ontario. In 1979, he was appointed assistant professor at Harvard Business School. He became a tenured professor at Harvard Business School in 1988. In 1994, he was appointed Harvard Business School's Sebastian S. Kresge professor of marketing and co-chair of the university's marketing department.

In 1998, Quelch was appointed dean with vice chancellor status of London Business School. During his tenure at London Business School, revenue and student enrollment increased 50 percent over three years, and faculty numbers increased 30 percent. In 2001, London Business School received the Queen's Award for Enterprise and was ranked the eighth best business school in the world by the Financial Times.

Quelch returned to Harvard Business School in 2001 as Lincoln Filene Professor of Business Administration and senior associate dean for international development, responsible for overseeing the establishment of a global network of research centers. Between 2006 and 2008, he served as senior associate dean responsible for coordinating the planning and execution of Harvard Business School's 2008 centennial celebrations. He also served as a director of the Harvard Business School Publishing Company.

In 2009, Quelch was on sabbatical leave as the La Caixa Visiting Professor of International Management and chairman of the academic advisory council at the China Europe International Business School (CEIBS), a Shanghai-based school co-founded by the Chinese Communist Party and European Commission. From 2011 and 2013, Quelch served as dean, vice president, and Distinguished Professor of International Management at the Shanghai-based institution. During his tenure at CEIBS, its The Financial Times MBA global ranking improved from 24th to 15th and its Executive MBA program ranking improved from 18th to 7th. The number of full-time faculty and CEIBS revenue both increased by one-third. Special emphasis was placed on upgrading CEIBS research output, executive education, global awareness and fundraising.

Quelch returned to Harvard Business School in 2013 as the first Harvard Business School professor to hold a joint primary appointment at both Harvard Business School and the Harvard T.H. Chan School of Public Health, where he was professor of health policy and management. Between 2013 and 2017, he also served as an associate in research at Harvard's Fairbank Center for Chinese Studies, fellow of the Harvard China Fund, and a member of the Harvard China advisory board.

=== Miami Herbert Business School ===
In 2017, Quelch was appointed dean of the University of Miami School of Business Administration, renamed in 2019 as the University of Miami Patti and Allan Herbert Business School. He also serves as the Leonard M. Miller University Chair Professor and vice provost for executive education at the University of Miami.

In December 2022, the University of Miami announced the departure of Quelch as the school's dean and the appointment of an interim replacement; in January 2023, the university announced that it was launching a search for a permanent replacement.

=== Duke Kunshan University ===
In December 2023, Quelch was appointed executive vice chancellor at Duke Kunshan University in Kunshan, China.

== Research and publications ==
Quelch's early research focused on the application of marketing to preventive healthcare programs and appear in the article "Marketing Principles and the Future of Preventive Health Care" (Milbank Memorial Fund Quarterly/Health and Society, 1980) and other papers in the American Journal of Clinical Nutrition and Nutrition Reviews. Quelch later focused on how to improve the design and productivity of temporary price promotions, leading to his 1989 book, Sales Promotion Management, published by Prentice Hall.

In the late 1980s, Quelch turned his research to the marketing implications of globalization. His research on global marketing was profiled in a book, Conversations With Marketing Masters (John Wiley, 2007). His books on this subject include:

- The Global Market (Jossey Bass, 2005)
- The New Global Brands: Managing Non-Governmental Organizations in the 21st Century (Thomson, 2006)
- Business Solutions For The Global Poor (Jossey Bass, 2007)
- Greater Good: How Good Marketing Makes For Better Democracy (Harvard Business Press, 2008)
- All Business Is Local (Penguin/Portfolio, 2012)
- Global Marketing Management (6th edition, BVT Publishing, 2017).

Since 2013, Quelch has focused on patient centricity and consumer empowerment in healthcare and written several books on the topic, including Consumers, Corporations and Public Health (Oxford University Press, 2016), Building A Culture of Health: A New Imperative for Business (Springer, 2016), Compassionate Management of Mental Health in the Modern Workplace (Springer, 2018), and Choice Matters How Healthcare Consumers Make Decisions (Oxford University Press, 2018).

Quelch's healthcare practitioner-focused articles embrace eighteen contributions in the Harvard Business Review. His articles include "Bringing Customers Into The Boardroom" (Harvard Business Review, November 2004), "How Global Brands Compete" (Harvard Business Review, September 2004), "Building And Valuing Global Brands in the Nonprofit Sector", (Nonprofit Management and Leadership, 2007), "Governance in the Public Sector", (Directors & Boards, 2008), "An Exploration of Marketing's Impacts on Society: A Perspective Linked to Democracy" (Journal of Public Policy and Marketing, 2008), "How To Market In A Downturn" (Harvard Business Review, April 2009). "Can Corporate Social Responsibility Survive The Recession?" (Leader to Leader, 2009), and "Government Adoption of Sales Promotions: An Initial Appraisal" (Journal of Public Policy & Marketing, 2010).

Quelch also has produced teaching materials and innovations in pedagogy. His case studies have sold over four million copies, the third highest in Harvard Business School history.

Quelch is among the top 40 Case authors since the list began in 2016. He ranked 22nd in 2018/19, 15th in 2017/18, 13th in 2016/17 and 11th in 2015/16. He is also featured on the list of The Case Centre's all-time top authors list (covering 40 years), released in 2014.

In 1995, he developed the first Harvard Business School interactive CD-ROM exercise (on Intel's advertising budgeting process). In 1999, he developed and presented a series of twelve one-hour programs on marketing management for the PBS. His Marketing Know:How blog, published by Harvard Business School Publishing, has been translated into Chinese and Vietnamese.

In 2018, Quelch led an initiative to offer every student at the University of Miami free access to The New York Times and The Wall Street Journal.

In recognition of his thought leadership, Quelch received the William L. Wilkie "Marketing for a Better World" award from the American Marketing Association foundation in 2020. In the same year, he received the "Alumni Award of Merit" from the Harvard T.H. Chan School of Public Health.

== Other activities ==
In 2002, acting Massachusetts governor Jane Swift appointed Quelch chairman of the board of the Massachusetts Port Authority, responsible for overseeing three airports, waterfront real estate, and the seaport of Boston. In this pro bono role, he chaired the security and safety committee and, later, the strategy and services committee of the Massport board. He submitted his resignation to Massachusetts governor Deval Patrick in January 2011.

Quelch served from 2003 to 2013 as honorary consul general of the Kingdom of Morocco for the New England region. His long-standing ties to the Middle East led to his book, Business Strategies For Muslim Countries (Prentice Hall, 2000).

Quelch has governance experience as a non-executive director of public companies in the United States and the United Kingdom. In 2013, he stepped down as a non-executive director of WPP plc, the world's largest marketing and media services company, after 25 years of service. He has served as a director of Alere, Aramark, easyJet plc, Pentland Group plc, Pepsi Bottling Group, and Reebok. He is senior strategy advisor to JD.com, the Chinese e-commerce company.

Quelch has served as honorary chairman of the British American Business Council of New England, as a trustee of the London-based STARS foundation and as a board member of Americans for Oxford, Accion International, and the national council of Better Business Bureaus.

Quelch has worked as a consultant, seminar leader or conference speaker in more than sixty countries and has assisted companies, including American Airlines, Apple, Barclays, Beiersdorf, Colgate-Palmolive, Deutsche Post, GE, IBM, Intel, Nestle, Novartis, Procter & Gamble, Qualcomm, SABIC, Samsung, Sinopec, Unilever, and Walt Disney.

In 2006, Quelch was named by The Sunday Times as one of the "Top 25 Britons who call the shots in America". He received the annual leadership award from the British American Business Council of New England in 2008 and from the World Affairs Council of Boston in 2010. Quelch was appointed Commander of the Order of the British Empire (CBE) in the 2011 Queen's Birthday Honours in recognition of his promotion of British business interests and prosperity. He was awarded the Ellis Island Medal of Honor in 2020.

== Memberships ==
Quelch is a member of the American Academy of Arts and Sciences, the Trilateral Commission, Council on Foreign Relations, and the international advisory board of British American Business, Inc. He is a companion of the British Institute of Management, a fellow of the International Academy of Management, a freeman of the City of London and a member of the Worshipful Company of World Traders, an honorary fellow of both London Business School and Exeter College, Oxford, and a twelve time faculty fellow of the World Economic Forum.
