= Pettet =

Pettet is a surname. Notable people with the surname include:

- Brette Pettet (born 1999), Canadian ice hockey player
- Clayton Pettet (born 1994 or 1995), English singer and performance artist known professionally as Babymorocco
- Darren Pettet (born 1975), Australian rugby league footballer
- Isabella M. Pettet (1848–1912), American physician
- Joanna Pettet (born 1942), British actress
- William Varney Pettet (1858–1938), Canadian politician
- Yasmin Pettet (born 2001), English television personality
