= Michael J. Bronson =

American orthopaedic surgeon, Chairman of the Department of Orthopedic Surgery

- Born: January 10, 1952
- Education: NYU, New York Medical College
- Medical career
- Profession: orthopaedic surgeon
- Institutions: Mount Sinai Hospital
- Sub-specialties: total hip replacement total knee replacement

Michael J. Bronson is an American orthopaedic surgeon who is Chairman of the Department of Orthopedic Surgery, Mount Sinai West and Mount Sinai Morningside, and Chief of Joint Replacement Surgery at the Icahn School of Medicine at Mount Sinai in New York, and the author of advances in the development of minimally invasive surgical instruments to advance unicondylar partial knee replacement, including the Vision Total Hip System, a widely used hip replacement system that avoids the use of cement.

From 1977 to 1979, Bronson was the assistant team physician to the New York Yankees, the New York Knicks, the New York Jets and the New York Islanders. He is currently Chief of Joint Replacement Surgery at Mount Sinai Hospital and Associate Professor of Orthopaedic Surgery at the Icahn School of Medicine at Mount Sinai, both in New York City. His practice focuses on total hip and total knee replacement, partial knee replacement, and revision of failed total joint replacements.

Bronson is the author of 17 publications and has been listed among New York Magazine's "Best Doctors". Castle Connolly has listed him eight times among New York's "Top Doctors", as well as "Top Doctors in America." He has received the American Medical Association's Physicians Recognition Award with Commendation 10 times since 1981.

== Biography ==
Bronson was born in 1952. He received his B.A. from New York University in 1973 and his M.D. from New York Medical College in 1976. He completed a residency in general surgery at Lenox Hill Hospital in 1977, and, in 1980, two additional residencies: in orthopedic surgery at Lenox Hill Hospital and in pediatric orthopedics at Children's Hospital Boston in Massachusetts. He completed a fellowship in joint replacement surgery at Columbia-Presbyterian Medical Center as the Senior Annie C. Kane Fellow in Hip and Knee Surgery.

Bronson joined the staff at Lenox Hill Hospital in 1981. In 2005, he joined the staff at Mount Sinai Hospital.

Bronson serves as an editorial reviewer for The Journal of Arthroplasty and Clinical Orthopaedics and Related Research. He is a member of American Medical Association, the American College of Surgeons, the Medical Society of the State of New York, the New York State Society of Orthopedic Surgeons, the New York County Medical Society, the New York Academy of Medicine, Independent Doctors of New York and the American Association of Hip and Knee Surgeons.

== Honors and awards ==
- New York Super Doctors, 2009, 2010, 2011, 2012, 2013, 2014

== Publications ==
Partial list:

- Bronson, M.; Grelsamer, R.; Strauss, E.; Moucha, C. (2014). "The Prevalence of Modifiable Surgical Site Infection Risk Factors in Patients Undergoing Hip and Knee Joint Replacement at an Urban Academic Medical Center Pruzansky". Journal of Arthroplasty. 29 (2): 272–276. doi:10.1016/j.arth.2013.06.019. PMID 23890832.
- Bronson, M.J. (2014). "CORR Insights: Do Various Factors Affect the Frequency of Manipulation Under Anesthesia After Primary Total Knee Arthroplasty? 2014 Knee Society Proceedings". Clinical Orthopaedics and Related Research. 473 (1): 148–50. doi:10.1007/s11999-014-3826-0. PMC 4390941. PMID 25080264.
- Bronson, W.; Strauss, E.; Bronson, M. (2010). "Osteoarthritis: Eliminating Pain and Restoring Function—An Orthopedic Perspective". Clinical Geriatrics.
- Stets, K.; Koehler, S.; Bronson, W.; Bronson, M. (June 2010). "Weight and Body Mass Index Change after Total Joint Arthroplasty". Orthopedics. 33 (6): 6. doi:10.3928/01477447-20100429-13. PMID 20806770.
- Fitzsimmons, S.E.; Vazquez, E.A.; Bronson, M.J. (2010). "How to Treat the Stiff Total Knee Arthroplasty?: A Systematic Review". Clinical Orthopaedics and Related Research. 468 (4): 1096–1106. doi:10.1007/s11999-010-1230-y. PMC 2835585. PMID 20087698.
- Yang, S.S.; Bronson, M.J. (1993). "Cystic enlargement of the iliopsoas bursa causing venous obstruction as a complication of total hip arthroplasty. A case report". The Journal of Arthroplasty. 8 (6): 657–661. doi:10.1016/0883-5403(93)90015-V. PMID 8301286.
- Alexiades, M.M.; Clain, M.R.; Bronson, M.J. (1991). "Prospective study of porous-coated anatomic total hip arthroplasty". Clinical Orthopaedics and Related Research (269): 205–208. doi:10.1097/00003086-199108000-00029. PMID 1864040.
- Liveson, J.A.; Bronson, M.J.; Pollack, M.A. (1991). "Suprascapular nerve lesions at the spinoglenoid notch: Report of three cases and review of the literature". Journal of Neurology, Neurosurgery, and Psychiatry. 54 (3): 241–243. doi:10.1136/jnnp.54.3.241. PMC 1014393. PMID 2030352.
- Scuderi, G.; Bronson, M.J. (1987). "Triradiate cartilage injury – Report of two cases and review of the literature". Clinical Orthopaedics and Related Research (217): 179–189. doi:10.1097/00003086-198704000-00016. PMID 3549091.
- Lewis, M.; Kreps, S.; Bronson, M.J. (1979). "Computerized Tomography, its Role in Bone and Soft Tissue Tumors". Orthopedic Review. 8 (7).
