= M. Belle Brown =

American physician and surgeon

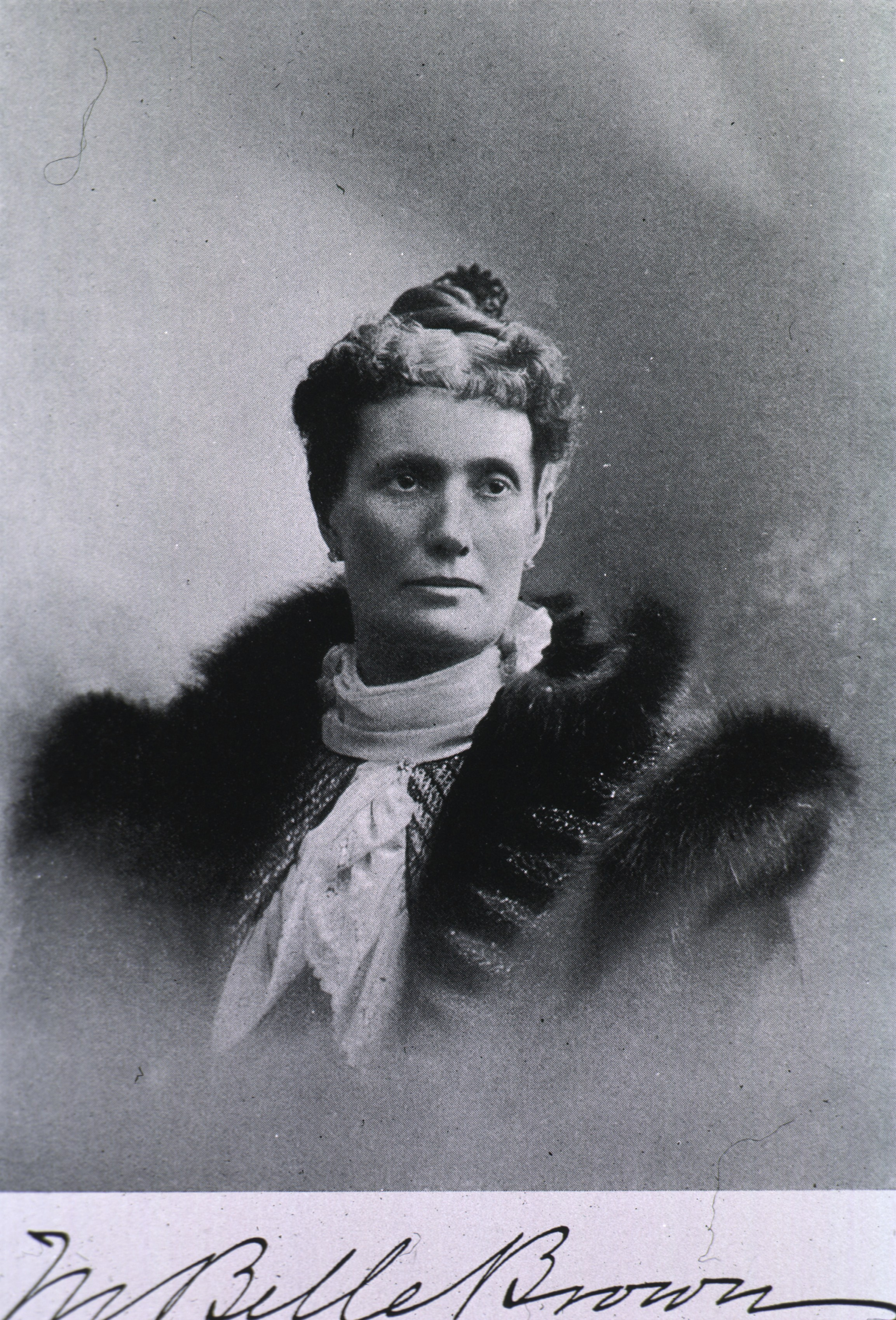
- Born: March 1, 1848; Staunton Township, Ohio
- Died: July 13, 1924 (aged 76); Troy, Ohio
- Education: New York Medical College
- Occupations: physician, surgeon
- Known for: Dean of New York Medical College
- Relatives: Chad Brown (great-grandfather)

Mary Belle Brown, M.D. (March 1, 1846 – July 13, 1924) was an American physician and surgeon, one of the few women in medicine of her time to perform surgery. She was professor and dean of the New York Medical College and Hospital for Women.

== Early life and family ==
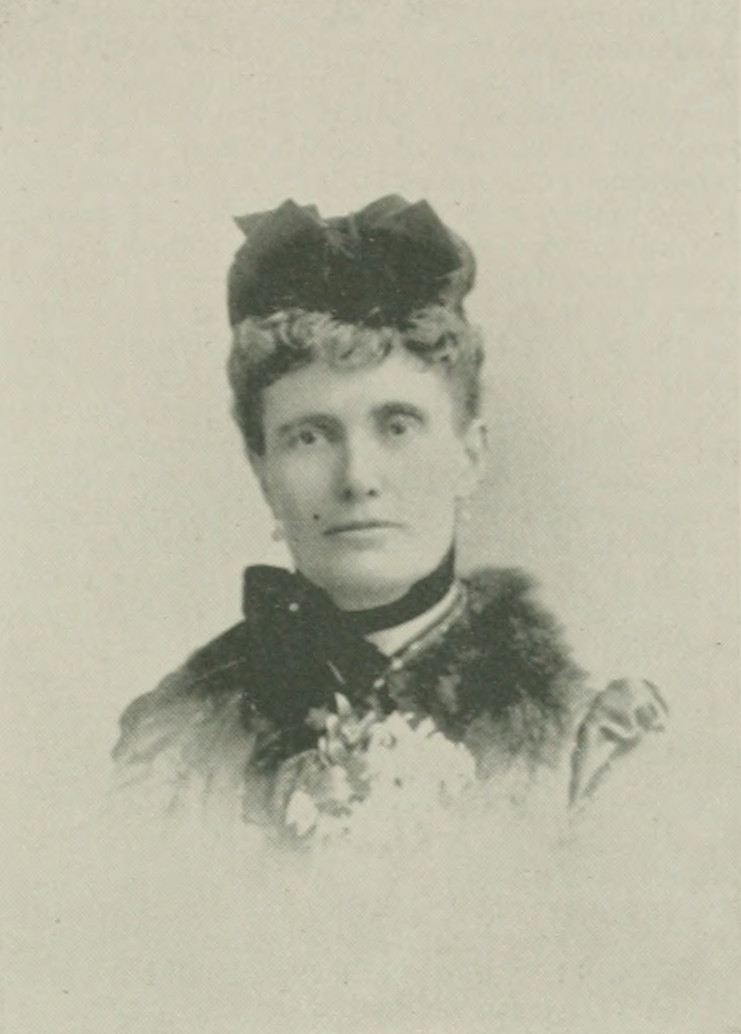
Portrait of Brown from "A Woman of the Century"

M. Belle Brown was born in Staunton Township, Miami County, Ohio, on March 1, 1848. Her father, Daniel Brown (1809–1877), was born in Rhode Island and moved west in 1828. M. Belle Brown was the granddaughter of Arnold Brown and the great-granddaughter of Reverend Chad Brown, a co-founder of Providence Plantations who emigrated to the United States from England in 1638,

M. Belle Brown's mother's name was Telford, and her ancestors were of the Jennings family from England. Brown's maternal grandfather was Andrew Telford, a pioneer of Miami County. Brown's maternal grandmother, Eliza Telford (1816–1899), was the neighborhood doctor in emergencies and kept salves and liniments for everybody who desired them. Brown had 5 siblings: Cyrus Telford (1844–1914), Cornelia J. (1844–1907), Rebecca, Arnold O. (1852–1928) and Harry W. (1860–1917).

Brown was educated in the public schools in Troy, Ohio, and later attended Oxford Female College in Oxford, Ohio.

== Career ==
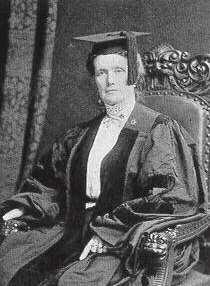
Brown in her academic robes, 1879.

Brown began studying medicine in 1874. In 1876, she entered the New York Medical College and Hospital for Women in Valhalla, New York. She graduated in 1879 and opened a general practice in West 34th street, New York. She later moved the practice to 30 West 51st street, where she practiced from 1890 until her retirement. During the earlier years her practice took her frequently to the poorer quarters of the city.

Brown was one of the few women of her time who performed surgery. She attended clinics in New York and Chicago, studying under noted surgeons. She specialized in the diseases of women and was professor of diseases of women in the New York Medical College and Hospital for Women. Brown also served as secretary of the faculty of that institution. She was later made the dean, succeeding Dr. Clemence Sophia Harned Lozier, noted feminist activist and founder of the college.

Brown also discovered a remedy for motion sickness called "Ship-shape". She was a member of the American Institute of Homeopathy, of the New York County Medical Society, a member of the consulting staff of the Memorial Hospital in Brooklyn, and of the New York Homeopathic Sanitarium Association.

== Personal life ==
After a 40 year career, M. Belle Brown retired to Troy, Ohio in 1917.

During World War I, Brown was active in raising funds for the American Hospital of Paris, as well as for the Red Cross.

Brown died on July 13, 1924, in Troy and is buried at Riverside Cemetery, Troy, Section 3, Lot 118, with her family.
