= William V. Silverberg =

American psychoanalyst

- Born: Abraham Arthur Gottlieb; July 26, 1897; New York City, New York
- Died: October 10, 1967 (aged 70); White Plains, New York
- Education: Columbia College; Columbia Medical School
- Occupation: Psychoanalyst
- Medical career
- Institutions: Sheppard and Enoch Pratt Hospital; New York Medical College

William V. Silverberg (July 26, 1897 – October 10, 1967) was an American psychoanalyst and a founder of the American Academy of Psychoanalysis and Dynamic Psychiatry.

== Biography ==
Silverberg was a native of New York City. He received his B.A. from Columbia College and his medical degree from the Columbia University College of Physicians & Surgeons.

Silverberg began his psychiatric career in the mental hygiene clinic of Mount Sinai Hospital in New York City. He became a member of the American Psychoanalytic Association in 1924 and was elected a life member 35 years later. In 1928, he moved to Berlin to train with Franz Alexander, an early disciple of Sigmund Freud and studied under Sandor Rado at the Berlin Psychoanalytic Institute.

Returning to the United States, Silverberg was appointed director of clinical research at the Sheppard and Enoch Pratt Hospital. He returned to New York in 1933 and was active in the psychoanalytic movement, becoming contributing editor to The Psychoanalytic Quarterly.

In 1941, Silverberg co-founded the Association for the Advancement of Psychoanalysis with Dr. Karen Horney, who was disqualified by the New York Psychoanalytic Society & Institute for her rejection of several of Freud's basic tenets. He served as the Association's first president, and was on the faculty of the American Institute for Psychoanalysis and held courses at the New York Medical College. In 1944, he co-founded the first psychoanalytical training program attached to a medical school, a three-year graduate course at New York Medical College.

In 1956, Silverberg was a founder of the American Academy of Psychoanalysis and Dynamic Psychiatry and was its president in 1958. From 1950 to 1966, Silverberg was a professor of psychiatry at New York Medical College as well as a consultant and trustee of High Point Hospital in Port Chester, New York.

Silverberg died on October 10, 1967, in White Plains, New York at 70 years old.
