= Janifer =

Janifer is a surname. Notable people with the surname include:

- Clarence Sumner Janifer (1886–1950), American physician
- Laurence Janifer (1933–2002), American novelist

== See also ==
- Jennifer (given name)
