= Edward C. Halperin =

American academic administrator

Edward C. Halperin, is the chancellor and CEO of New York Medical College (NYMC) where he is also a professor of radiation medicine, pediatrics and history. He also serves as the Miriam Popack Chair in Biomedical Ethics and director of the Hirth and Samowitz Center for Medical Humanities and Holocaust Studies at NYMC, director of bioethics in the School of Health Sciences and Practice at NYMC, as well as provost for biomedical affairs for the Touro College and University System, a position he has held since 2012.

Halperin is a pediatric radiation oncologist, medical historian and health sciences educator. His research focuses on pediatric cancer, ethics and the history of racial, religious and gender discrimination in higher education. He is the co-author/editor of the first through sixth editions of Pediatric Radiation Oncology, the fourth through eighth editions of Principles and Practice of Radiation Oncology and more than 240 articles in peer-reviewed scientific, historical, education and ethics literature.

Halperin is on the website editor of the Paediatric Radiation Oncology Society. He was previously associate editor of the International Journal of Radiation Oncology, Biology, Physics, on the editorial boards of Academic Medicine and Radiology, associate editor and deputy editor of the North Carolina Medical Journal.

He is a member of the American Association for the History of Medicine, American College of Radiology, American Medical Association, Alpha Omega Alpha, American Society of Therapeutic Radiology and Oncology, Beta Gamma Sigma, New York Academy of Medicine, and Sigma Xi.

== Early life and education ==
Born in Somerville, New Jersey, United States to parents Irving Max Halperin, a pharmacist, and L. Ruth J. Halperin, an eighth grade English teacher. He attended the public schools of Somerville including Somerville High School.

Halperin graduated summa cum laude with a B.S. in economics from The Wharton School of the University of Pennsylvania in 1975, followed by an M.D. cum laude from Yale School of Medicine of Yale University in 1979. He completed his internship in internal medicine at Stanford University in 1980 and his residency at Harvard Medical School/Massachusetts General Hospital in 1983. He later earned an M.A. in history from Duke University. Halperin received his medical license from the National Board of Medical Examiners in 1980 and currently has active medical licenses in New York and North Carolina; and board certification in therapeutic radiology in 1983 from the American Board of Radiology.

== Professional career ==
Halperin was on the faculty at Duke University for 23 years – starting in 1983 as an assistant professor in the Division of Radiation Oncology. He became an associate professor with tenure in the Department of Radiation Oncology in 1987 and associate professor in the Department of Pediatrics in 1990. In 1993, he became professor of the Department of Radiation Oncology and departmental chair in 1994. Halperin was appointed Department of Radiation Oncology chair then vice dean of Duke University School of Medicine and associate vice chancellor for academic affairs at Duke University Medical Center.

In 2006 Halperin moved to the University of Louisville and was named dean of the School of Medicine, Ford Foundation Professor of Medical Education and professor of radiation oncology, pediatrics and history. Then in 2011, he became the vice provost.

In 2012 Halperin was named chancellor and chief executive officer of the New York Medical College in Valhalla, New York.

Halperin currently teaches medical history and principles of oncology classes and practices medicine at NYC Health + Hospitals/Metropolitan in New York City, and Westchester Medical Center in Valhalla, New York.

== Personal life ==
Halperin has been married, since 1981, to Sharon F. Halperin, Director of the Center for Holocaust, Genocide and Human Rights Education of North Carolina. The Halperins are the parents of three daughters and grandparents of five children.

== See also ==
- New York Medical College
- Touro College and University System
