= New York Medical College =

Private medical school in Valhalla, New York, US

- Type: Private medical school
- Established: 1860; 166 years ago
- Parent institution: Touro University System
- Endowment: $85.5 million (2025)
- Chancellor: Edward C. Halperin
- President: Alan Kadish
- Faculty: 131 FT/ 181 PT (2023)
- Students: 1,470 (800 medical)
- Location: Valhalla, New York, United States; 41.085017°N 73.810041°W
- Campus: Suburban, 600 acres (243 hectares)
- Colors: Maroon, ochre
- Website: www.nymc.edu

New York Medical College (NYMC or New York Med) is a private medical school in Valhalla, New York. Founded in 1860, it is a member of the Touro University System.

NYMC offers advanced degrees through its three schools: the School of Medicine (SOM), the Graduate School of Biomedical Sciences (GSBMS) and the School of Health Sciences and Practice (SHSP). Total enrollment is 1,660 students (including 774 medical students) in addition to 800 residents and clinical fellows. NYMC employs 1,350 full-time faculty members and 1,450 part-time and voluntary faculty. The university has more than 12,000 alumni active in medical practice, healthcare administration, public health, teaching and research.

Part of the Touro University System since 2011, New York Medical College is located on a shared suburban 600-acre campus with its academic medical center, Westchester Medical Center (WMC) and the Maria Fareri Children's Hospital. Many of NYMC's faculty provide patient care, teach, and conduct research at WMC. New York Medical College's university hospital, Metropolitan Hospital Center, in the Upper East side neighborhood of Yorkville and East Harlem in Manhattan, has been affiliated with NYMC since it was founded in 1875, representing the oldest partnership between a hospital and a private medical school in the United States. Metropolitan is part of the New York City Health and Hospitals Corporation (HHC), the largest municipal hospital and healthcare system in the country.

With a network of 20+ affiliated hospitals in New York, New Jersey, Connecticut and West Virginia, NYMC's hospital affiliations include large urban medical centers, small suburban clinics, rural medical centers and high-tech regional tertiary care facilities, where medical students and residents are afforded a wide variety of clinical training opportunities.

== History ==
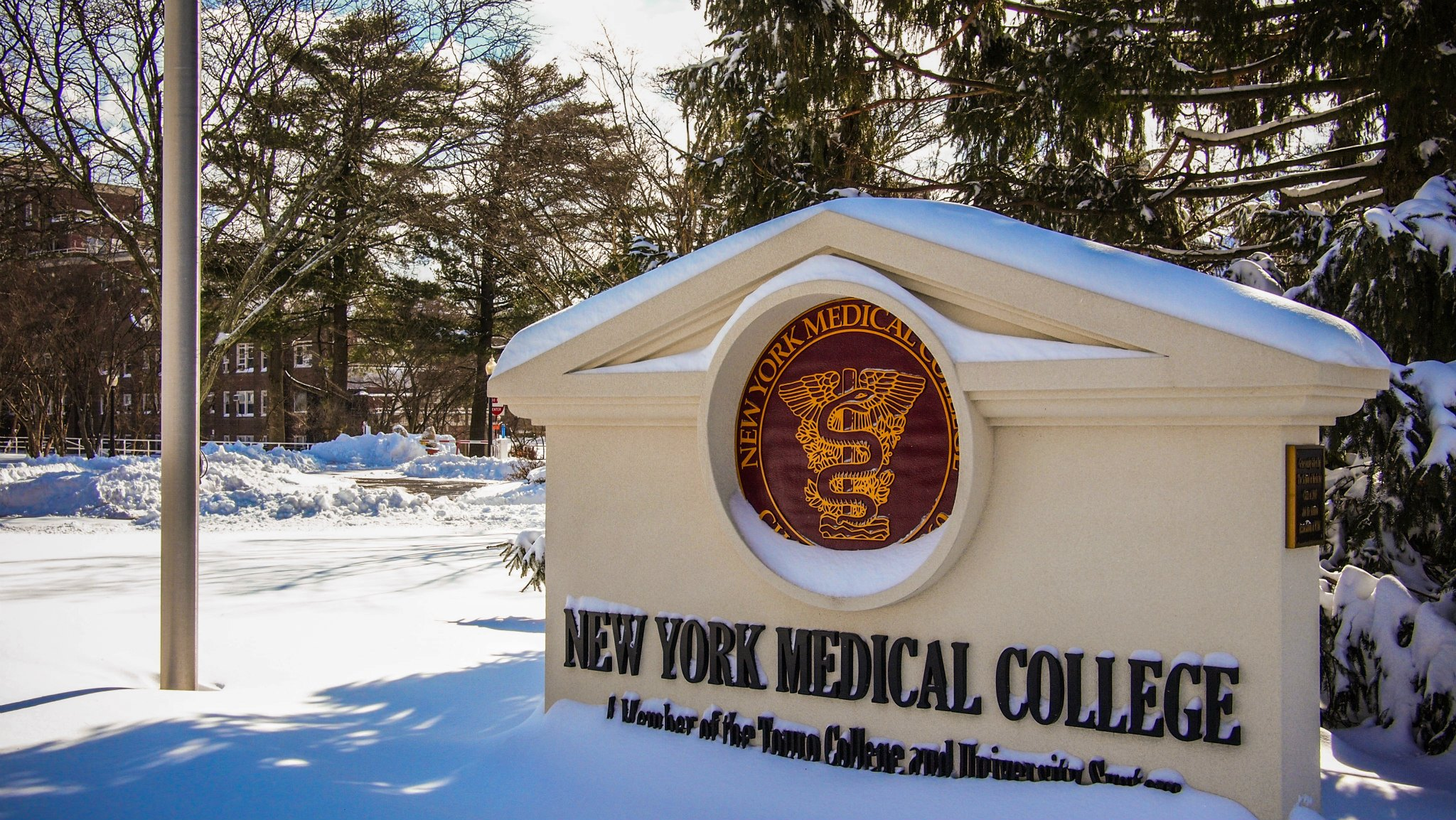

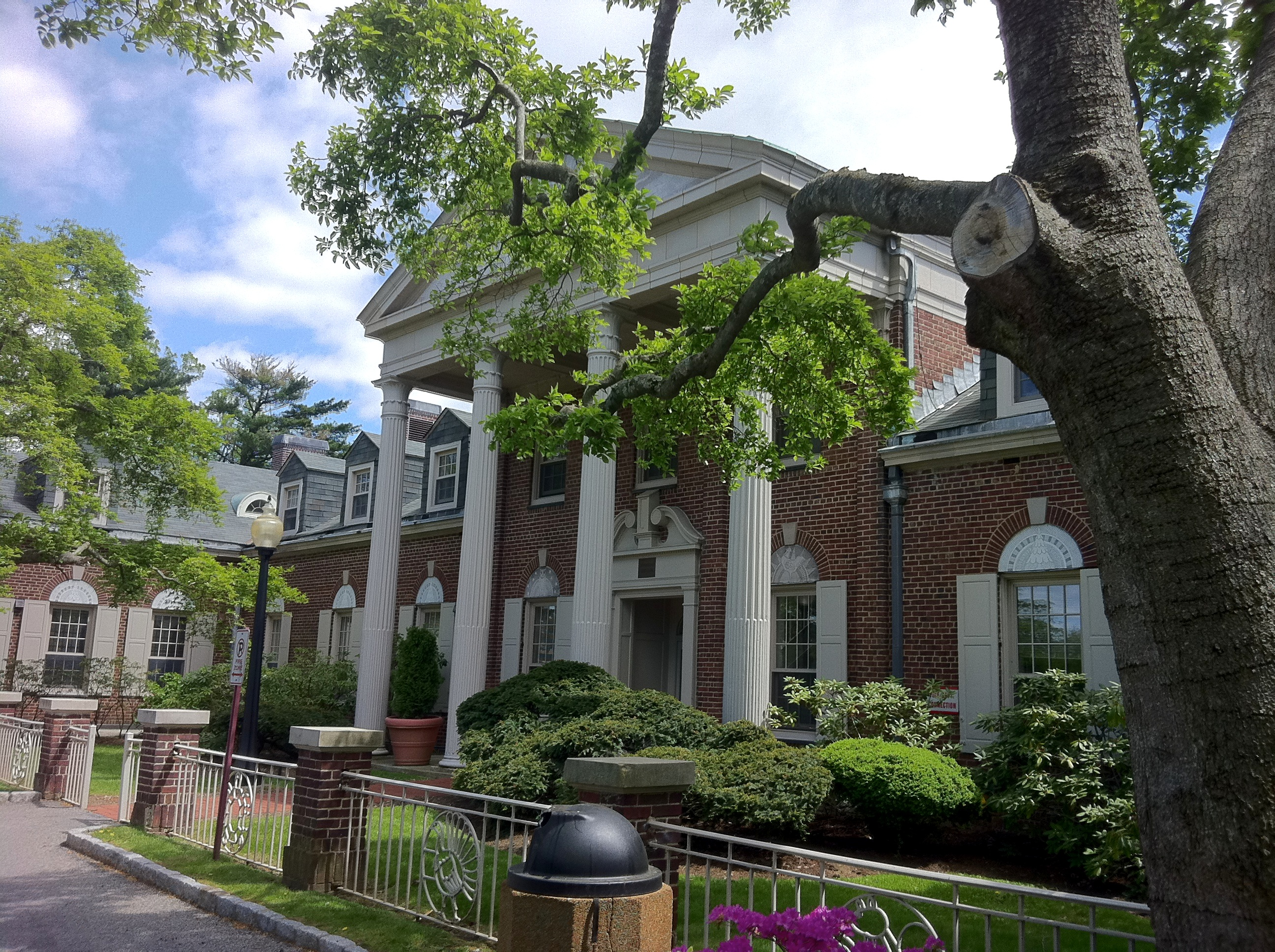
Sunshine Cottage Administration Building

New York Medical College owes its founding in 1860 to a group of civic leaders who believed that medical studies should be practiced with a better understanding of what the patient needs. This group of civic leaders was led by the noted poet William Cullen Bryant, who was an editor of the New York Evening Post. Bryant was concerned about the condition of hospitals and medical education in New York City. His main concern was with some of the medical practices being used to treat disease, which at the time included bleedings, purges, and the administration of strong drugs in too large doses.

Interest in the medical field rapidly grew over the next few years due to the United States Civil War, which generated a major need for health related occupations. As a result, the college was founded and opened as the Homeopathic Medical College of the State of New York on the corner of 20th Street and Third Avenue, near Union Square in Manhattan. In the first semester there were 59 students and 8 professors. The college adopted the name New York Homeopathic Medical College in 1869 and, in 1887, New York Homeopathic Medical College and Hospital.

The sister institution known as the New York Medical College and Hospital for Women was founded a few years later in 1863 by Clemence Lozier. In 1867, it graduated Emily Stowe, the first female physician to practice in Canada. Three years later in 1870, Susan McKinney Steward graduated as the first African-American female physician in New York State. One of its later graduates, Adelaide Wallerstein in the class of 1905, also held a law degree, and founded the East Side Clinic for Children in 1906. When the Women's College closed in 1918, its students transferred to New York Medical College.

In 1875, Metropolitan Hospital Center opened as a municipal facility on Ward's Island, staffed largely by the faculty of New York Medical College. As a university hospital of New York Medical College, this relationship is among the nation's oldest continuing affiliations between a private medical school and a public hospital.

Built by New York Medical College in 1889, the Flower Free Surgical Hospital, was the first teaching hospital in the United States to be owned by a medical college. It was constructed at York Avenue and 63rd Street with funds given largely by Congressman Roswell P. Flower, later governor of New York. In 1908 the college changed its name to New York Homeopathic Medical College and Flower Hospital. In 1928 the college was the first medical school in the nation to establish a minority scholarship program. By 1935, the college had transferred its outpatient activities to the Fifth Avenue Hospital at Fifth Avenue and 106th Street. The college (including Flower Hospital) and Fifth Avenue Hospital merged in 1938 and became New York Medical College, Flower and Fifth Avenue Hospitals.

In 1972, New York Medical College moved to Valhalla, at the invitation of the Westchester County government, which desired to build an academic medical center. Completed in 1977, Westchester Medical Center is the main academic medical center of the college. The college became affiliated with the Roman Catholic Archdiocese of New York in 1978, which helped provide financial stability and also established a shared commitment for the public good in the area of health care and the health sciences. The college recognized itself in the Catholic tradition and affiliated with several Catholic hospitals. When Flower and Fifth Avenue Hospital closed in 1979, the remaining operations of New York Medical College were transferred to the Valhalla campus. The college shortened its name to New York Medical College in 1982.

In 2010, the NYMC community celebrated the 150th anniversary of the founding of NYMC with a year full of sesquicentennial celebration activities. In that same year, it was announced that Touro College, a Jewish-sponsored institution in Manhattan, had reached an agreement to assume the sponsorship role for New York Medical College from the Roman Catholic Archdiocese of New York. In a ceremony held at Bryant Park in New York City on May 25, 2011, New York Medical College officially joined the Touro University System creating one of the largest health sciences universities in the country. New York Medical College embraces its unique history in having been a secular institution to an institution in the Roman Catholic tradition, to now being part of a Jewish-sponsored institution of higher education.

In 2011, St. Joseph's Medical Center in Paterson, New Jersey and Lenox Hill Hospital in Manhattan, New York were designated as affiliates. Saint Michael's Medical Center in Newark, New Jersey; Brookdale University Hospital and Medical Center in Brooklyn, New York; and the Beckley Department of Veterans Affairs in Beckley, West Virginia, also joined NYMC in 2014 as academic affiliates adding to the breadth and diversity of clinical experiences for students and residents.

In 2013, NYMC acquired the former IBM Research building at 19 Skyline Drive in Hawthorne, a 250,000 square foot, five-story building which provides essential space for offices and new programs. In addition, NYMC acquired 7 Dana Road and has renovated it into a state-of-the-art biotechnology incubator (BioInc@NYMC) and Clinical Skills and Disaster Medicine Training Center.

In 2016, caricatures were added along the campus walkway. NYMC restored statues that were originally part of the children's wing of Grasslands Hospital (known today as NYMC's Sunshine Cottage Administration Building). The statues, along with the animal adornments on the building itself, were created to raise the spirits of sick children who were once treated here. The statues are thought to have been modeled after characters in English author Lewis Carroll's novel Alice's Adventures in Wonderland (1865). The statues live along the walkway that leads to Dana Road.

On June 8, 2017, New York Medical College opened the Center of Excellence in Precision Responses to Bioterrorism and Disasters. The center is the twelfth center of excellence in the state of New York, and the first in the Hudson Valley. The goal of the center is to maximize efficiency and effectiveness immediately after high-casualty events like terrorist attacks or natural disasters by improving resources provided to first responders. Additionally, the center provides training for responses to terror attacks and natural disasters, as well as researches response techniques to chemical and biological terror challenges. State Senator Terrence Murphy, a major supporter of state funding for the center, said the center "gives the region a vitally needed local resource to fight terrorism and potentially protect the lives of first responders and our families."

After Empire State Development, New York state's economic development organization, designated the facility as a center of excellence, New York Medical College received a state grant of $500,000 for costs associated with operations. Explaining New York's goal for the center, Dr. Robert W. Amler, dean of the School of Health Sciences and Practice, said, "The state wants to bring innovation technology into each region in a way that will stimulate more outside investment from the federal government and private resources." In the future, New York Medical College, through the center, aims to achieve full development of an "austere medicine" training facility for first responders, including scenarios they will likely encounter in reality, like active shooter threats, fires, and car accidents. In this aspect of training, trainees must encounter smoke, fog, loud noises, explosion simulations, and a variety of other disorienting effects.

== Schools ==
=== Graduate School of Biomedical Sciences (GSBMS) ===
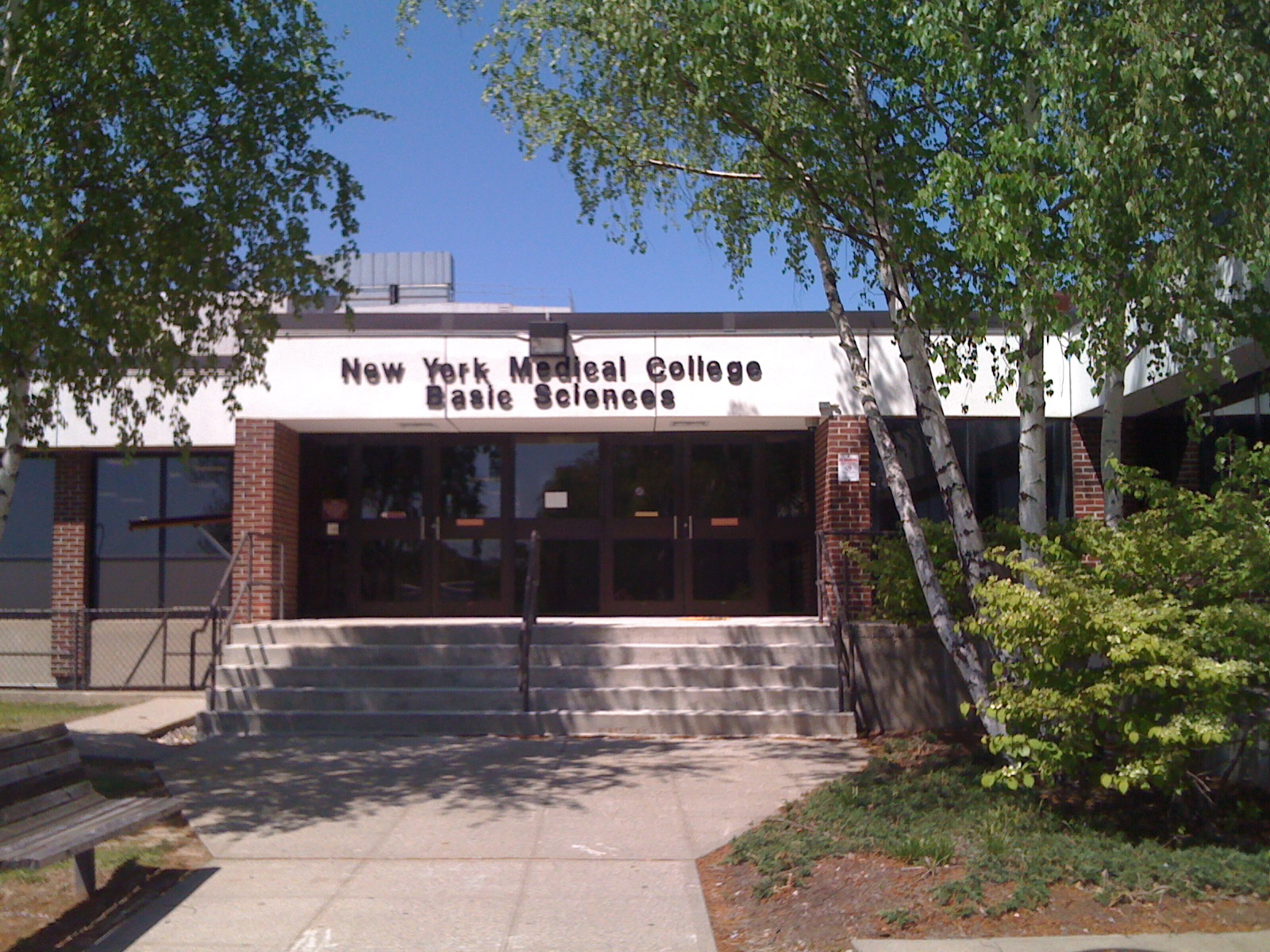
In addition to housing Doc's Cafe cafeteria, The Cafe, the health sciences library, the Basic Sciences Building (BSB) houses the Graduate School of Biomedical Sciences, formerly known as the Graduate School of Basic Medical Sciences, and its laboratories.

The college's involvement in graduate education dates back to 1910 when its records show the existence of advanced courses and research programs. Graduate courses in surgery and medicine were offered in the 1920s. In 1938, the college's charter was amended to include the authority to offer graduate degrees. In 1963, the Graduate School of Medical Sciences was officially founded, establishing for the first time a center for graduate education separate from the medical curriculum. The school was renamed the Graduate School of Biomedical Sciences in 2022.

The GSBMS prepares future researchers, teachers, senior-level scientists and technicians to work in academia and industry. It is in the Basic Sciences Building along with facilities of the School of Medicine. The graduate school has approximately 150 enrolled students and 90 faculty members. It offers doctor of philosophy, Master of Science, and a M.D./Ph.D. dual degree program for current and prospective medical students.

=== School of Health Sciences and Practice (SHSP) ===
The School of Health Sciences and Practice began in 1981 as the Graduate School of Health Sciences, located at Vosburgh Pavilion near the School of Medicine and Westchester Medical Center. Student enrollment is approximately 500 with 221 faculty members (150 full-time).

The SHSP offers accredited programs in public health (MPH, DrPH), speech language pathology (MS), and doctor of physical therapy (DPT). Doctoral students may pursue a dual degree (M.D./MPH) or joint degree (DPT/MPH) at significantly reduced cost.

=== School of Medicine (SOM) ===
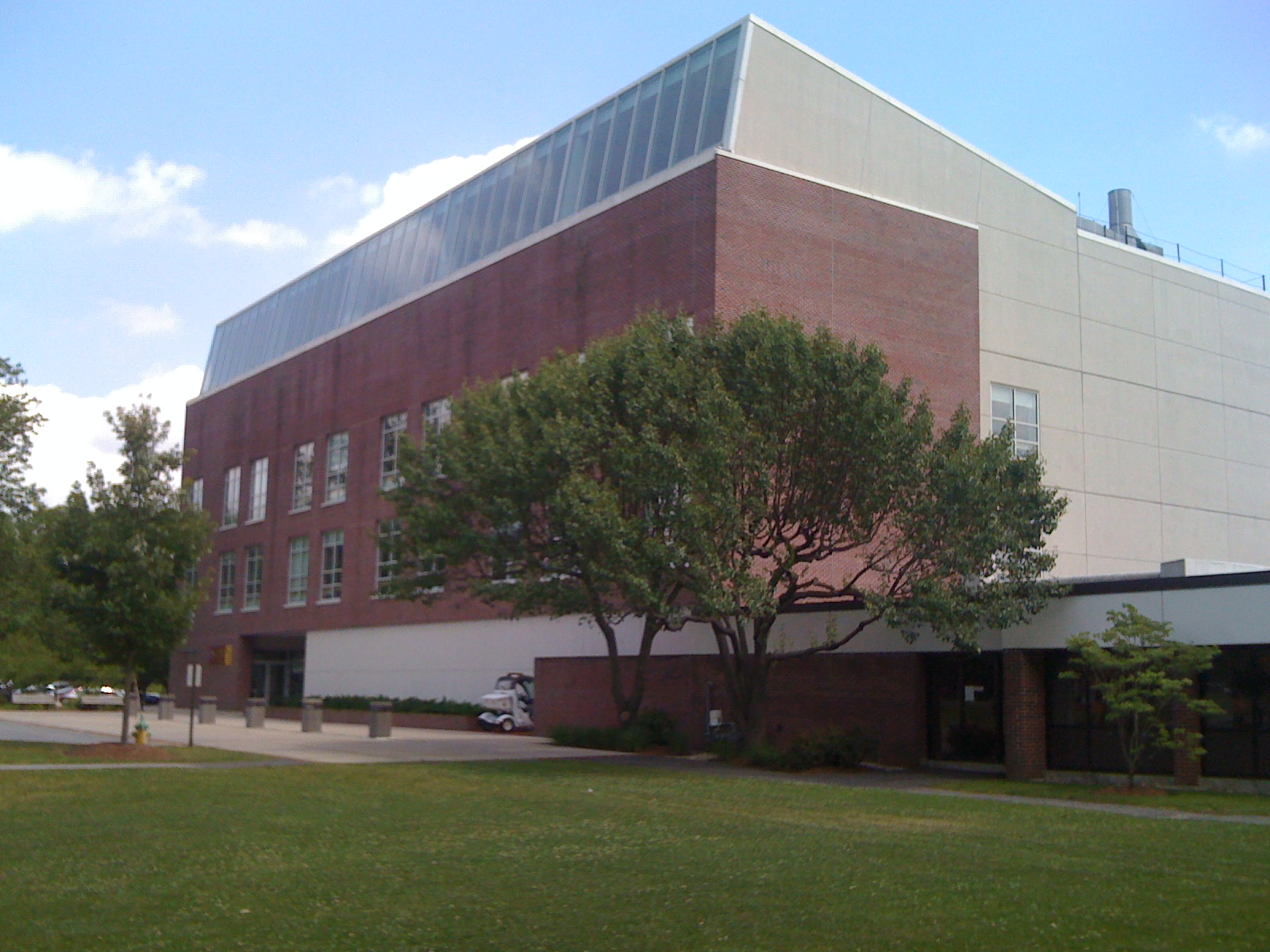
The Medical Education Center (MEC) houses facilities of the School of Medicine. It is distinguished by the prominent location of the naturally-lit gross anatomy laboratory (top floor).

Founded in 1860, the School of Medicine at New York Medical College is one of the oldest in the nation. It is the largest of the three graduate schools, awarding approximately 190 Doctor of Medicine degrees per year. Students have the opportunity to earn dual degrees such as M.D./M.P.H., M.D./M.S. or M.D./Ph.D. in the School of Health Sciences and Practice or Graduate School of Biomedical Sciences

The School of Medicine has 774 actively enrolled students (31% in-state) along with 2,944 faculty members serving in 6 basic science and 20 clinical departments. Grading is Honors/High Pass/Pass/Fail. On-campus housing is provided for most preclinical students in furnished, unfurnished, single or married configurations.

The medical school has adopted the multiple mini interview system as well as the CASPer test, both developed by McMaster University Medical School to select students for admissions.

The class entering in 2025 had an average 3.77 GPA and an average 516 MCAT score. 21% of students self-reported as members of groups underrepresented in medicine.

In 2009, the passing rate for the USMLE Step 1 exam was between 99 and 100%, above the national average. As of 2007, 13,270 physicians had graduated from the School of Medicine with 97% of them board-certified. Approximately 917 graduates had served on an American medical school faculty, including 18 department chairs.

=== Rankings ===
For 2024, U.S. News & World Report ranked the college tied for #101 for Research and #112-123 for Primary Care out of 193 medical schools.

== Affiliated hospitals and organizations ==
Located on campus, Westchester Medical Center is the main academic medical center of New York Medical College School of Medicine. It is ranked among the top five hospitals in New York State for bariatric surgery, and one of 25 hospitals in the nation to receive the American Heart Association's 2008 Triple Performance Award. Westchester Medical Center has the highest case mix index of all hospitals in the United States.

A significant portion of the medical school class relocates to New York City for clinical rotations, for which the primary site is Metropolitan Hospital Center in Manhattan. Housing is provided for rotations that are further from the main campus, such as those in Connecticut, New Jersey or Staten Island.

New York Medical College affiliated hospitals and health care organizations for graduate and undergraduate medical education:

=== Westchester and upstate New York ===
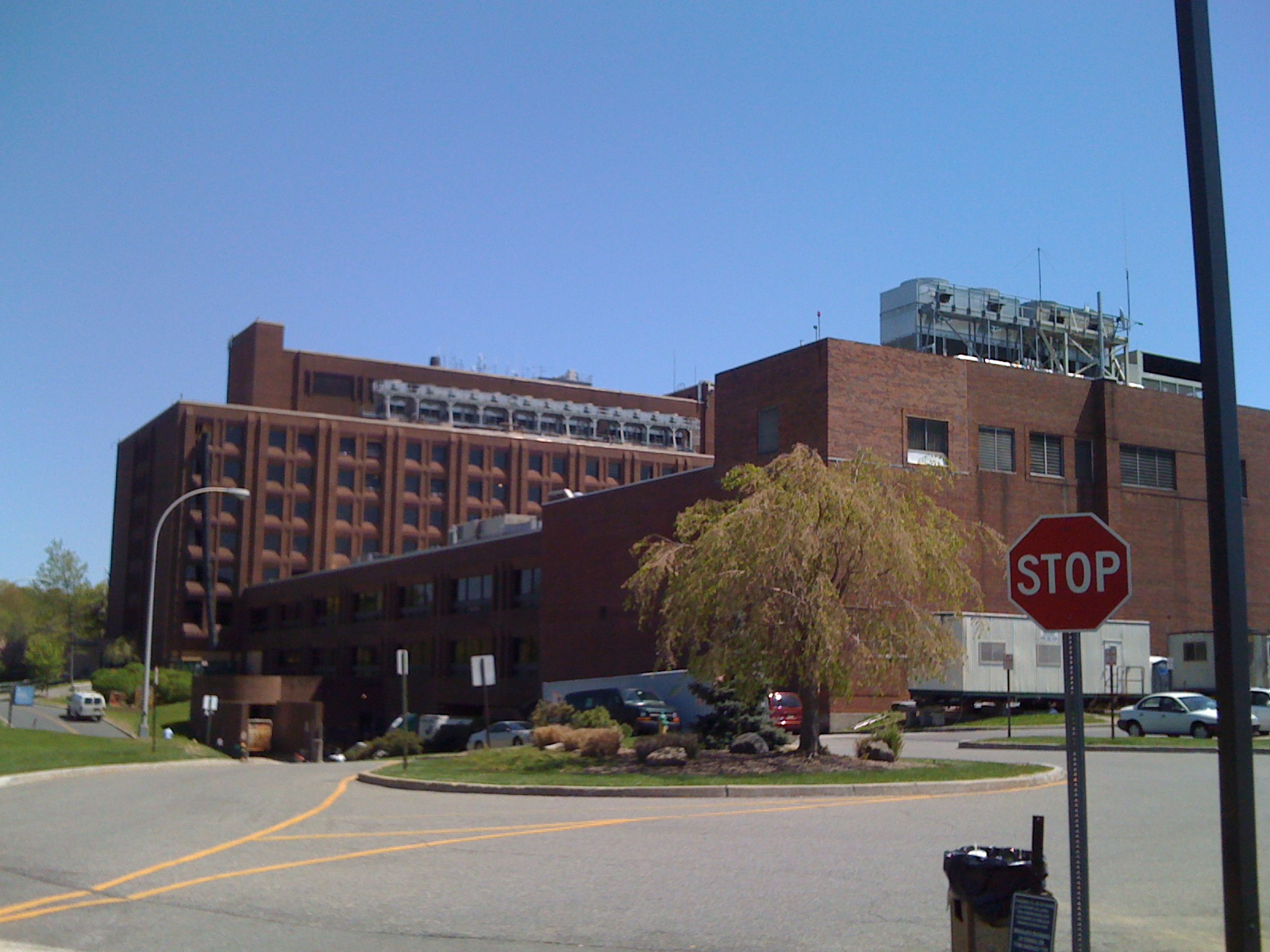
Westchester Medical Center main hospital building

- Westchester Medical Center (University Hospital)
- Maria Fareri Children's Hospital (University Hospital)
- Phelps Memorial Hospital Center, Sleepy Hollow
- Keller Army Community Hospital, West Point
- Saint Joseph's Medical Center, Yonkers
- VA Hudson Valley Health Care System, Montrose

=== New York City ===
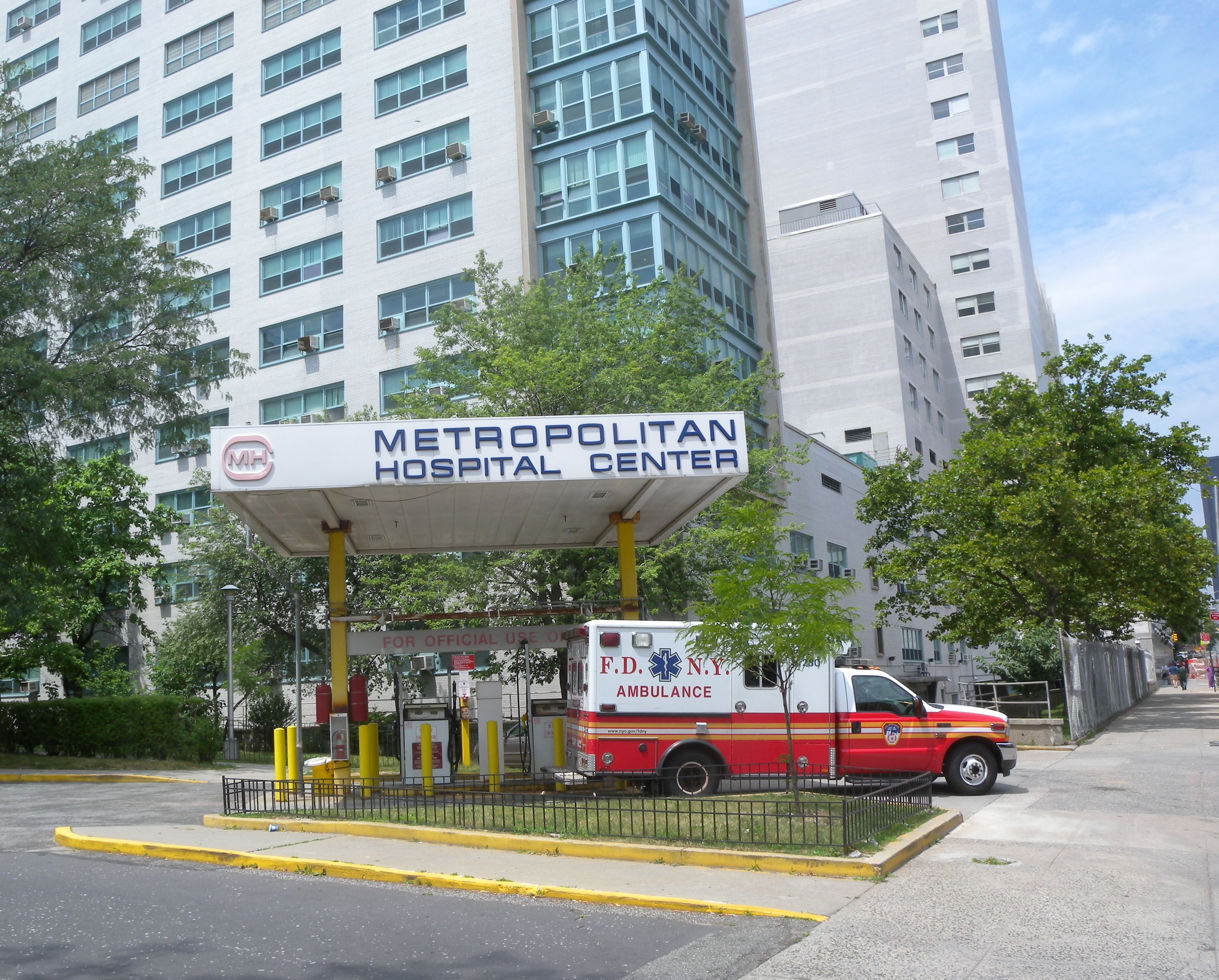
Metropolitan Hospital Center in Manhattan

- Metropolitan Hospital Center (University Hospital) (Manhattan)
- Brookdale University Hospital and Medical Center (Brooklyn)
- Calvary Hospital (Bronx, Brooklyn)
- Jamaica Hospital Medical Center, (Queens)
- Lenox Hill Hospital (Manhattan)
- Richmond University Medical Center (Staten Island)
- Terence Cardinal Cooke Health Care Center (Manhattan)
- Wyckoff Heights Medical Center (Brooklyn)

=== Connecticut ===
- Greenwich Hospital
- Norwalk Hospital
- St. Vincent's Medical Center (Bridgeport)

=== New Jersey ===
- Hoboken University Medical Center, Hoboken
- St. Joseph's Regional Medical Center, Paterson
- Saint Michael's Medical Center, Newark
- St Clares at Denville/St Mary's at Passaic

=== West Virginia ===
- Veterans Affairs Medical Center, Beckley

=== Ambulatory Care Programs ===
- Center for Comprehensive Health Practice
- Westchester Institute for Human Development
- Open Door Family Medical Centers

== Matriculation and residency match ==
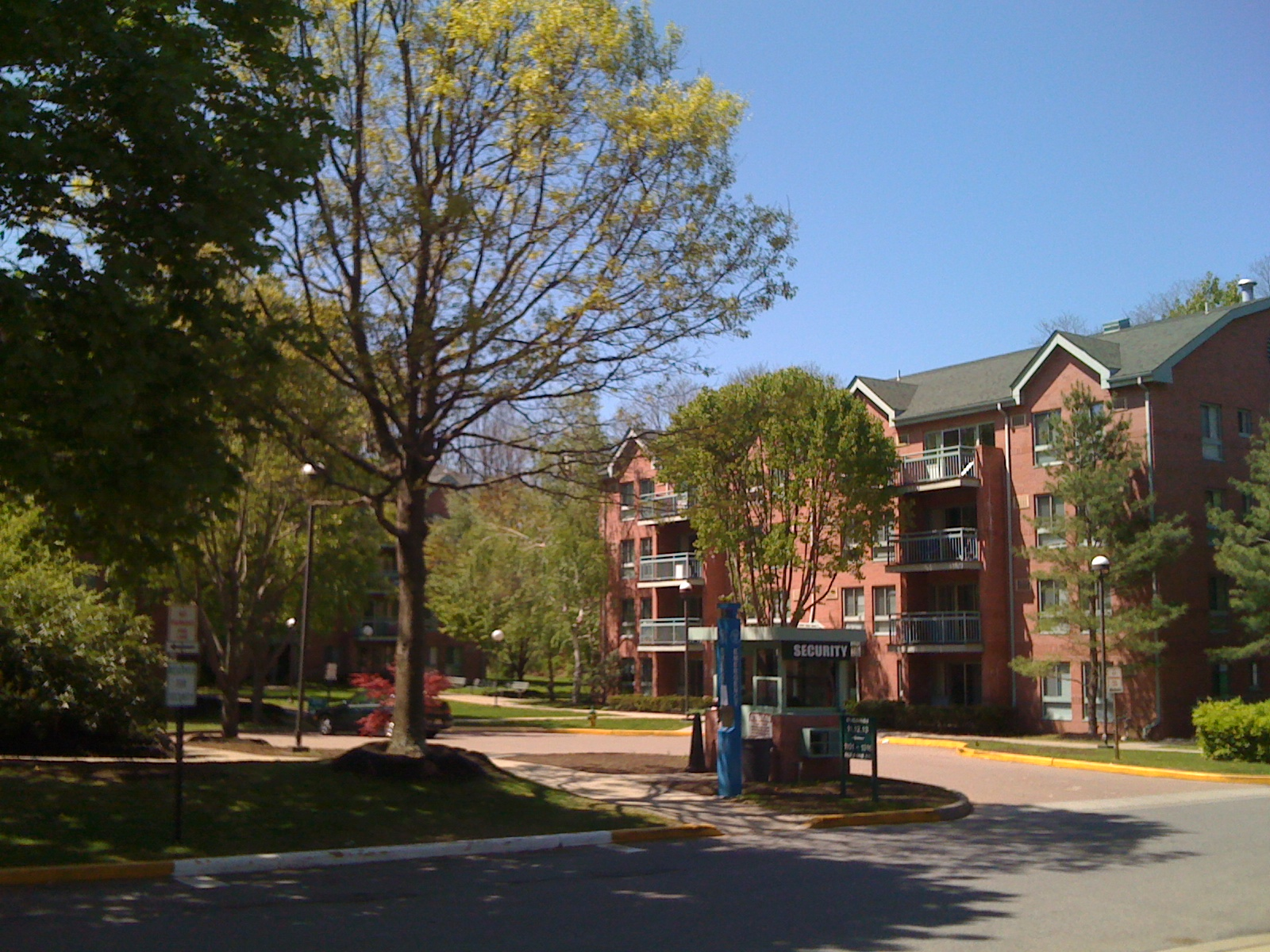
On-campus housing for most medical students and some graduate students.

Medical students are selected from colleges and universities across the country and the first-year class typically arrives with an average composite MCAT score of 516 (92nd Percentile) and an average GPA of 3.75.

== Notable alumni ==
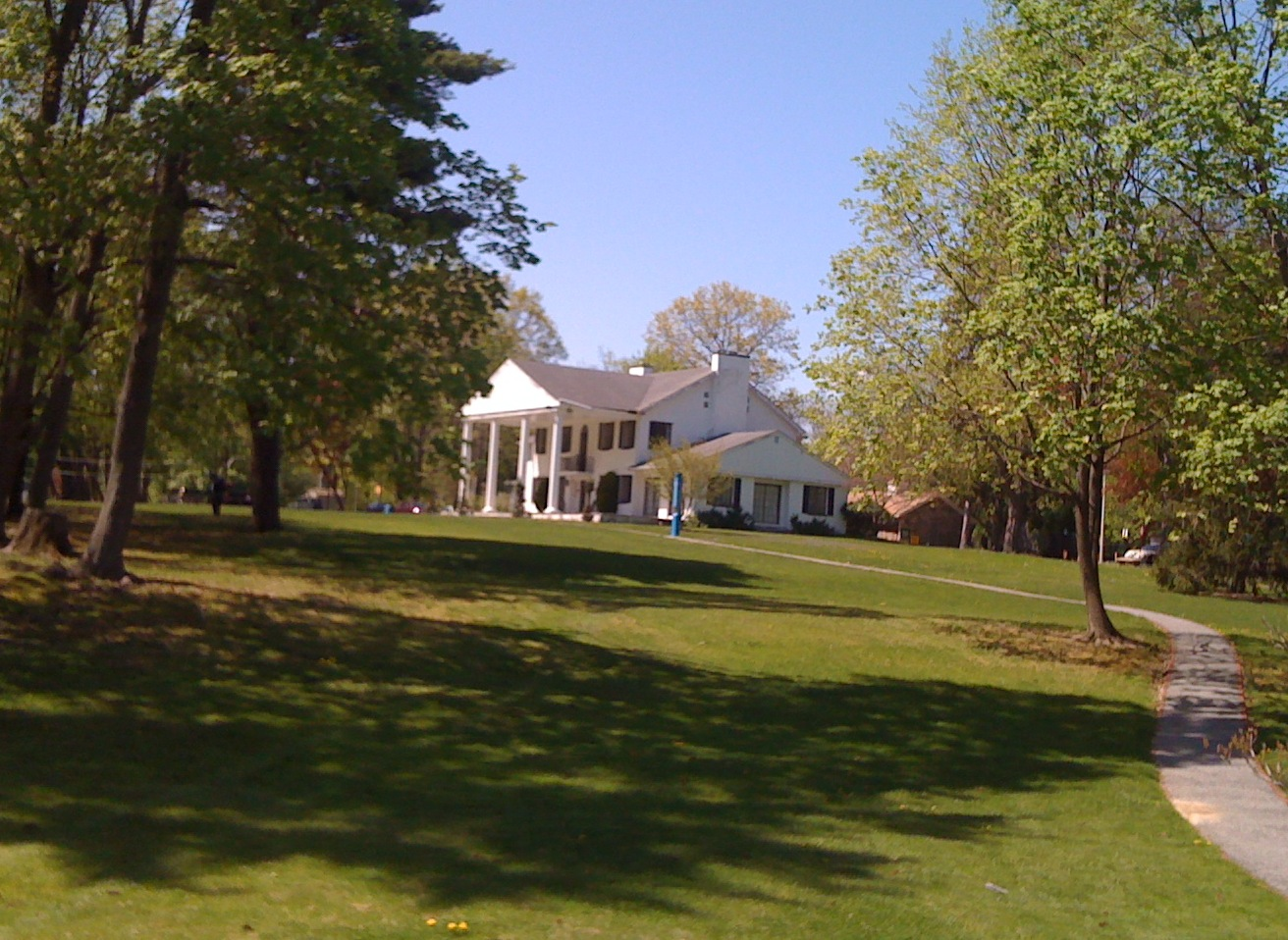
Alumni House: colonial farmhouse saved from demolition in 1982 by NYMC Alumni Association

- William Harkness – astronomer who discovered an important coronal emission line, United States Navy Rear Admiral and director of the United States Naval Observatory
- Cornelia Chase Brant qualified here in 1903 and rose to lead the college.
- Mary A. Brinkman – homeopathic physician
- Michael J. Bronson – co-director of Joint Replacement Services at the Mount Sinai Medical Center
- M. Belle Brown – one of the few women in medicine of her time who practiced surgery
- Harry J. Buncke – pioneering plastic surgeon, considered "The Father of Microsurgery." Past president of the American Association of Plastic Surgery, the American Society for Surgery of the Hand, and the International Society of Reconstructive Microsurgery. Former professor of surgery at Stanford University and the University of California San Francisco.
- Camille A. Clare – obstetrician and gynecologist, Chair of the Department of Obstetrics and Gynecology at SUNY Downstate Medical Center.
- Mary E. Green – president, American Household Economic Association
- Clarence Sumner Janifer – physician, public health official, World War I medical officer, and First African American member of the New Jersey State Medical Society.
- Helen Singer Kaplan – pioneer in the field of sex therapy and founder of the Human Sexuality Program at the Payne Whitney Clinic
- Joel Kupersmith – former dean of the Texas Tech University School of Medicine, and head of the Office of Research and Development of the Department of Veterans Affairs
- Robert Jay Lifton – psychiatrist and writer
- William Anthony Paddon – second-generation physician with Grenfell Mission; ship's surgeon in Royal Canadian Navy in World War II, including Battle of the Atlantic and Normandy Invasion; Lieutenant-Governor of Newfoundland and Labrador; Officer of the Order of Canada
- Naeem Rahim – nephrologist, co-founder of Idaho Kidney Institute Recipient of Ellis Island Medals of Honor.
- Susan McKinney Steward – first African-American female physician in New York State and third in the nation. Graduated in 1870, valedictorian of her class.
- Isabella Vandervall – African-American physician, graduated in 1915

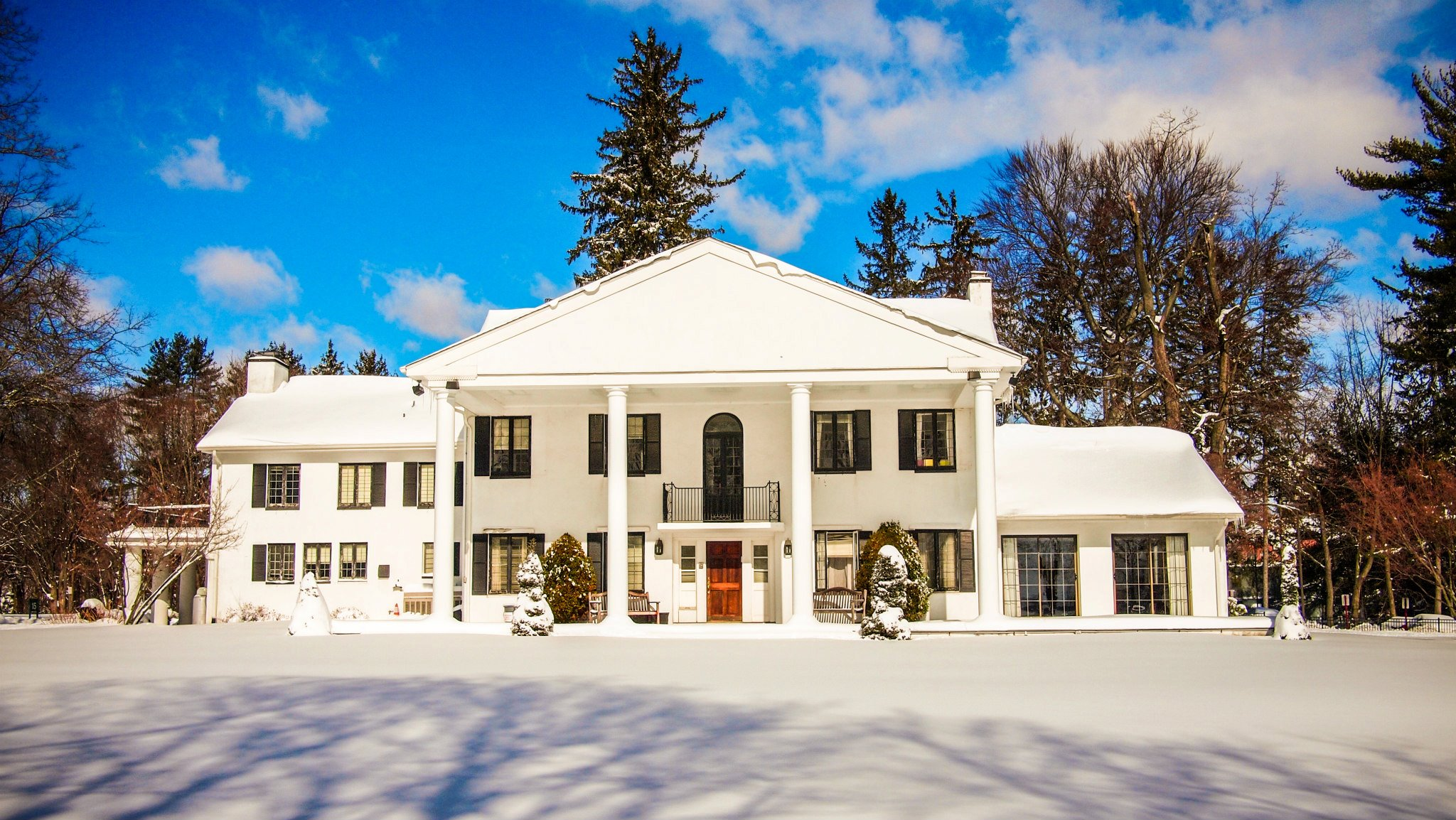

== Notable faculty ==
- Mary A. Brinkman - instructor in diseases of children
- Flemming Gomme Graae – Chief of Child Psychiatry
- Joseph T. English – former chair of the Department of Psychiatry and Behavioral Sciences, and Sidney E. Frank Distinguished Professor
- William V. Silverberg – Professor of psychiatry, co-founder of the American Academy of Psychoanalysis and Dynamic Psychiatry
