= Andrej Zdravič =

20th and 21st-century Slovenian filmmaker and artist

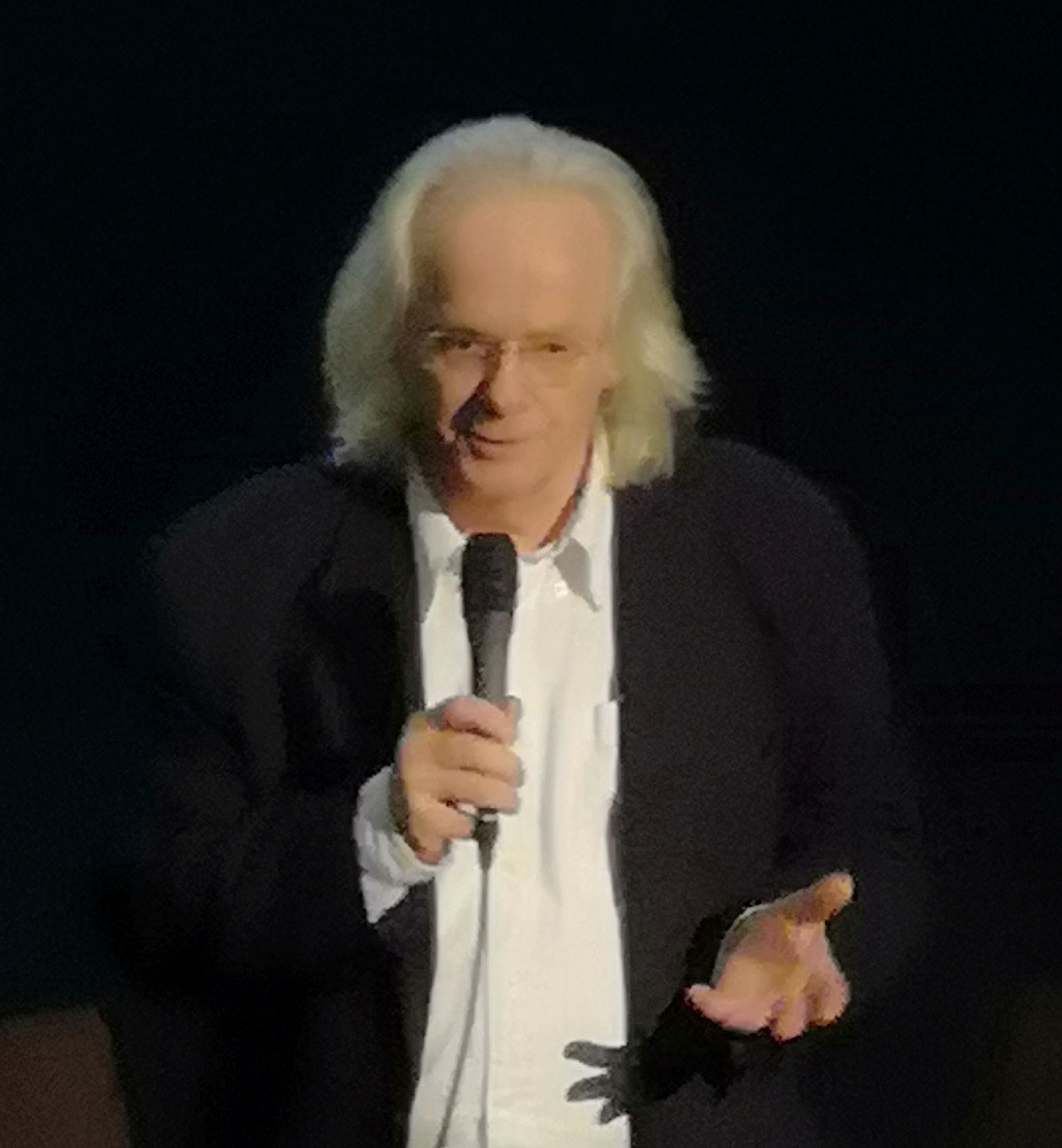
- Andrej Zdravič (April 2019)
- Born: February 2, 1952 (age 74); Ljubljana, Slovenia
- Known for: Film; Installation art Sound art
- Movement: Avant-garde cinema, Experimental film

Andrej Zdravič (born 2 February 1952 in Ljubljana) is a Slovenian independent filmmaker, sound and media artist. He was educated in Ljubljana, Algiers and Buffalo, receiving his BA (1975) and MA degrees (1980) in Media Studies at the State University of New York, Buffalo. He was awarded a Slovenian Prešeren Foundation Award in 1999 and received an honorary award (doctorate equivalent) for artistic achievement from University of Ljubljana in 2006.

== Biography ==
Zdravič is building a cinema style in which one can recognize the influences of Vertov, modern Jazz, Jonas Mekas, John Cage and Zen Buddhism. The camera, in author's hands, spontaneously reacts to the pulsating life stream... As if reality to which the camera is aimed at were "dictating" to the author the structure of the future work which is created in the process of mutual encounter‘ – Jovan Jovanovič, 1979.

Zdravič lived and worked in New York City in the years 1975–80 and in San Francisco in 1980–97. He was closely associated with the San Francisco Exploratorium museum, where he headed the Video Department and developed his video installation Water Waves-Time Horizon (using a unique software-controlled 8-channel audiovisual installation format), a permanent exhibit from 1993.

Zdravič's works have been screened in over 150 one-man shows and presentations across the United States and Europe, and in retrospectives at the Anthology Film Archives (NYC), Centre Georges Pompidou (Paris), Cankar Centre / Slovenian Cinematheque (Ljubljana); in over 120 group shows and festivals, among others, in the United Arab Emirates, India, Brazil and Argentina. His works have been broadcast on ARTE, KCET/PBS Los Angeles, ZDF, RAISAT, TV Slovenia, reaching more than 3 million viewers. Zdravič represented Slovenia at Expo '98 in Lisbon and the 48th Venice Biennale in 1999.

In recent years, Zdravič's work has focussed on developing a cinematic form concentrating almost solely on audiovisual aspects of natural phenomena. He has been cited in film theory publications examining the possibility of an "ecocinematic" form.

Zdravič has taught at the University of Wisconsin–Milwaukee and San Francisco State University and has been a Visiting Filmmaker at more than 30 others, including Stanford University, Royal College of Art London, Malmö University College, University College Falmouth in Cornwall, UK and the Academy of Fine Arts, Ljubljana.

Zdravič is the recipient of several awards, including the Western States Media Arts Fellowship, the National Science Foundation award (United States), and the Prešeren Fund Award (Slovenia, 1999).

In recent years, Zdravič has been especially involved in a sound and multi-screen installation project known as The Forest. The first work in the project is The Forest – Time Triptych, a 3-channel film and sound installation. Zdravič was responsibile for filming, editing, sound recording and composition, and the installation concept and development. It has been a permanent exhibit at the Triglav National Park Information Centre in Dom Trenta, Slovenia since 17 September 2011.

== Filmography ==
All Films Film/Sound Producer, Writer, Director, Camera, Editing, Sound-Music Recording & Composition: Andrej Zdravi.

- Origin 2001 24 min. sound 16mm/Betasp
- Obon 2001 6 min. sound 16mm/Betasp
- Heartbeat 2000 9.5 min. sound Betasp
- Riverglass (V steklu reke) 1997 41 min. sound Betasp
- Tokyo Tsukiji 1994 13 min. sound Betasp
- Ocean Beat 1990 60 min. sound 16mm
- Restless 1987 12 min. sound 16mm
- Kres (Bonfire) 1987 5 min. sound 16mm
- Airborne 1987 10 min. sound 16mm
- Air Trio 1985 18 min. sound 16mm
- Anastomosis 1982 58 min. sound 16mm
- Vsi Sveti (All Saints) 1981 5 min. silent 16mm
- Vesuvio 1981 10 min. silent 16mm
- Venezia 1981 7 min. sound 16mm
- Currents 1979 13.5 min. sound S-8mm/16mm
- Dom (Home) 1979 20 min. sound S-8mm
- Via Sound 1978 24 min. sound S-8mm
- New York Studies (I-V) 1977 37 min. silent 16mm
- Breath 1976 7 min. b&w sound 16mm
- Sunhopsoon 1976 7 min. sound 16mm
- Carbon Arc 1975 8 min. b&w sound 16mm
- Phenix 1975 14 min. sound 16mm
- Waterbed 1974 5.5 min. sound 16mm
- Camera Dances 1973 15 min. sound S-8mm

=== Time Horizon video installations ===
The Time Horizon concept developed by Zdravič is a unique software controlled 8-channel audiovisual installation format.

- OCEAN LAVA 1999 30 min. loop,
- SECRETS OF SOCA 1995–98 33 min. loop
- WATER WAVES 1992–93 28 min. loop

=== Selected commissions ===
- Nature and City 2006 15 min. sound hd/DVD
- Richard Serra at Oliver Ranch 1995 21 min. sound Betasp
- Water Cycle 1994 14 min. sound u-maticsp
- Extended Exploratorium 1990 14 min. sound Betasp
- Microsurgical Transplantation (Vol. i-iv) 1982 110 min. sound 16mm (produced with Harry J. Buncke, MD – the father of microsurgery)
- Present Status of Microsurgery in Hand Surgery 1981 29 min. sound 16mm (produced with Harry J. Buncke, MD)

== Screenings and exhibitions ==
=== Selected retrospectives ===
- Anthology Film Archives – a 3-day retrospective, New York City 2008
- Kinoteka (Slovenian Cinematheque) – Kino Integral, a 6-hour mini-retrospective, Ljubljana 2001
- Cankarjev Dom & Kinoteka – a 4-day retrospective, Ljubljana 1996
- Centre Georges Pompidou – a 3-day retrospective, Paris 1994
- Anthology Film Archives – a 2-day retrospective, New York City 1991
- Deutsches Filmmuseum – a 3-day retrospective, Frankfurt AM 1987

=== Permanent exhibitions ===
- National Museum of Natural Sciences – Water Waves, Taichung, Taiwan, from 1996–2005
- Kalamazoo Public Museum- Water Waves, Kalamazoo, Michigan, from 1996–2007
- Dom Trenta, Triglav National Park Inf. Center – Secrets of Soča -Time Horizon, Trenta, Slovenia, from 1995–present
- Exploratorium- Museum of Science, Art & Human Perception- Water Waves-Time Horizon, San Francisco 1993
- Obrazi Ljubljane – stalna razstava, (film-instalacija Narava & Mesto) Mestni muzej, Ljubljana 2007
