= Louder Than Words (film) =

- Theatrical poster
- Directed by: Anthony Fabian
- Written by: Benjamin Chapin
- Produced by: Julie Fareri
- Starring: David Duchovny; Hope Davis; Timothy Hutton; Madison Beer
- Cinematography: Elliot Davis
- Edited by: Melissa Kent
- Music by: Geoff Zanelli
- Production company: Identity Films
- Distributed by: ARC Entertainment
- Release dates: October 11, 2013 (Hamptons International Film Festival); July 1, 2014 (United States)
- Running time: 95 minutes
- Country: United States
- Language: English

Louder Than Words is a 2013 drama film directed by Anthony Fabian and written by Benjamin Chapin. Starring Timothy Hutton, David Duchovny and Hope Davis, the film focuses on a couple John (David Duchovny) and Brenda (Hope Davis) trying to deal with the death of their daughter Maria (Olivia Steele-Falconer). It was based on events that led to the founding of Maria Fareri Children’s Hospital in Valhalla, New York.

Production of the movie was stalled for a week in 2012 due to the aftermath of Hurricane Sandy.

== Plot ==
After the unexpected death of their daughter, a couple work to build a state of the art children's hospital where families are welcomed into the healing process.

== Cast ==
- Scott Cohen as Nick Spano
- Adelaide Kane as Stephanie Fareri
- Victoria Tennant as Lydia Thorsby
- Hope Davis as Brenda Fareri
- David Duchovny as John Fareri
- Timothy Hutton as Bruce Komiske
- Xander Berkeley as Dr. Lansen
- Craig Bierko as Eddie Stolzenberg
- Madison Beer as Amy
- Olivia Steele Falconer as Maria Fareri (credited as Olivia Steele-Falconer)
- Ben Rosenfeld as Michael Fareri
- Morgan Griffin as Julie Fareri
- Gary Wilmes as Steve Marchwinski
- Cassidy Hinkle as Lila
- Ryan Jonze as Greg
- Russell Gibson as Councilman Tom Fatone

== Reception ==
The film was released on October 11, 2013 at Hamptons International Film Festival and was received with mixed reviews. Ben Kenigsberg of The New York Times criticized the tone, feeling it did not do the actual events justice. Mark Jenkins of The Washington Post was similarly critical of the choices.
