= Maria Fareri Children's Hospital =

- Westchester County Health Care Corporation

Geography
- Location: 100 Woods Road, Valhalla, NY, United States
- Coordinates: 41°05′10″N 73°48′18″W

Organization
- Affiliated university: New York Medical College

Services
- Emergency department: Level I Pediatric Trauma Center

Helipads
- Helipad: FAA LID: 7NK8

History
- Founded: 2004

Links
- Website: Official website
- Lists: Hospitals in the United States

Maria Fareri Children's Hospital, a member of the Westchester Medical Center Health Network (WMCHealth), is the advanced care pediatric hospital for New York's Hudson Valley region and Fairfield County, Connecticut. Maria Fareri Children's Hospital is part of the Valhalla, NY campus of WMCHealth along with Westchester Medical Center and the Behavioral Health Center. It is home to hundreds of clinical and surgical pediatric specialists in almost every medical field. The hospital treats about 20,000 patients each year. The hospital cares for infants, children, teens, and young adults age 0-21 throughout upstate New York.

As part of Westchester Medical Center Health Network, an academic health affiliate of New York Medical College, Maria Fareri Children's Hospital is also a major teaching facility.

== History ==
=== Maria's Wish ===
Maria Fareri Children's Hospital was built through the efforts of hundreds of parents, medical professionals, and community leaders, including Brenda and John Fareri who lost their 13-year-old daughter, Maria, to rabies in 1995. The events surrounding her death and the founding of the hospital became the plot of the 2013 film Louder Than Words.

After Maria died, her parents learned that Maria had made a special wish as part of a school project - for the health and well-being of all the children in the world. Guided by Maria's wish, the Fareri family helped lead the design and creation of Maria Fareri Children's Hospital as a “family-centered” hospital. It is the only hospital in the United States named after a child.

== Pediatric specialties ==
MFCH offers advanced healthcare in the following specialties:

Medical Pediatrics	Surgical Pediatrics
• Adolescent Medicine	• Cardiothoracic
• Cardiology	• Neurosurgery
• Critical Care	• Ophthalmology
• Developmental Pediatrics	• Otolaryngology
• Emergency Pediatrics	• Plastic/Reconstructive
• Endocrinology	• General Pediatric Surgery
• Gastroenterology	• Urology
• General Pediatrics
• Genetics
• Infectious Diseases
• Metabolic Disease Center
• Neonatology
• Nephrology
• Neurology
• Oncology/Hematology
• Orthopedics
• Psychology/Psychiatry
• Pulmonology
• Rheumatology
