= Mary A. Brinkman =

American homeopathic physician (1846–1932)

Dr. Mary A. Brinkman M.D.
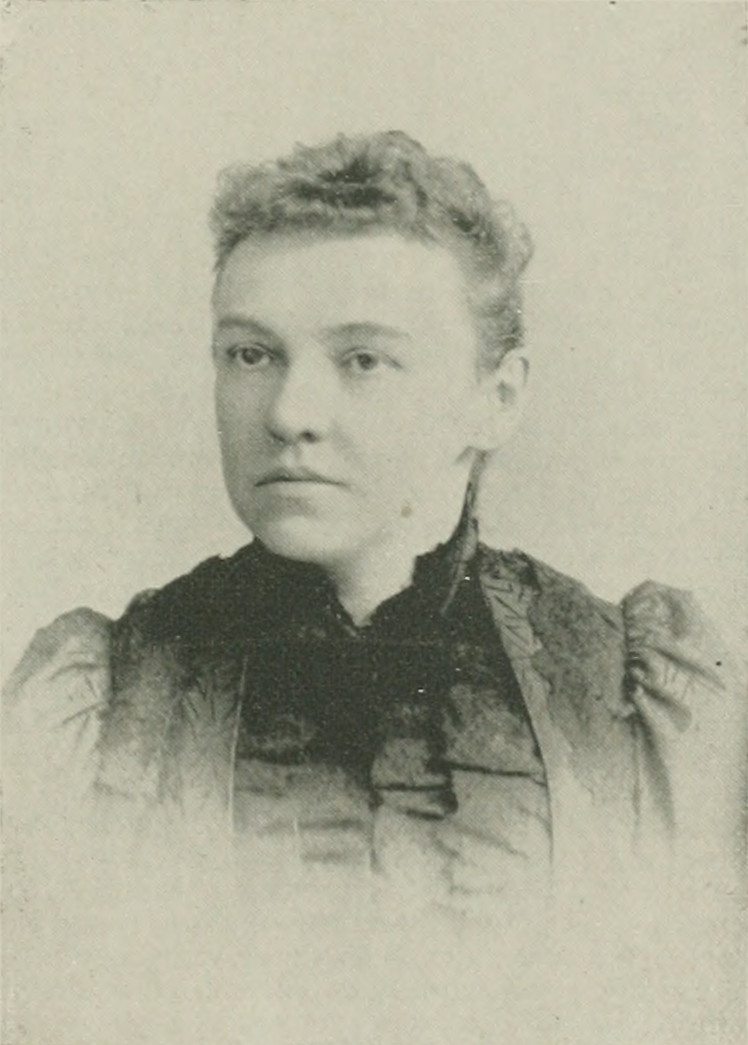
- Portrait photo from A Woman of the Century
- Born: Mary Abby Cushing Clapp; February 22, 1846; Hingham, Massachusetts, U.S.
- Died: January 25, 1932 (aged 85)
- Occupation: Homeopathic physician
- Spouse: James G. Brinkman (m. 1875)
- Medical career
- Sub-specialties: Gynaecology

Mary A. Brinkman (1846–1932) was an American homeopathic physician who specialized in gynaecology. By her training, education, acquired knowledge and natural endowments, she seemed predestined to exert a wide influence upon our era for the physical welfare of women through her lectures, medical writings, and contributions to literature. She was the first woman elected to the vice-presidency of the New York State Homoopathic Medical Society.

== Early life and education ==
Mary Abby Cushing Clapp born in Hingham, Massachusetts, February 22, 1846. Her parents were Alexander and Lauritta (Lincoln) Clapp. Her ancestors came to America in 1630, and trace their lineage to the time of Edward the Confessor. They took an active part in the French and Revolutionary wars, and in the war of 1812.

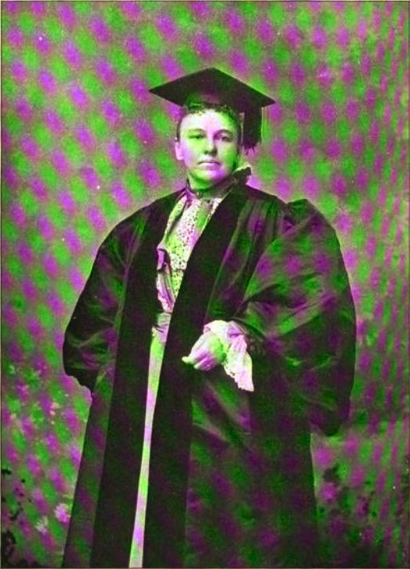
Brinkman in cap and gown.

In her youth, she acquired a common-school education as was customary for New England girls of her day. On reaching adulthood, she visited Europe, where she devoted herself to study and travel. It was at that time her thoughts were first turned to the study of medicine. Believing that women physicians were demanded by the times, she determined to join the medical profession. Soon after returning to the U.S., in 1871, she entered as a student the New York Medical College and Hospital for Women. At her graduation, three years later, she was chosen the valedictorian of her class, and her medical thesis, which was a part of the final examination, was published in the North American Journal of Homeopathy and attracted considerable attention.

== Career ==
After receiving her diploma, she continued to take instruction in the clinical department of the hospital, under private tuition, but was almost immediately chosen instructor in diseases of children. From that time, she continuously occupied one or another of the college chairs, averaging for half the year two lectures a week.

In 1874 she was appointed lecturer on diseases of children in the New York Medical College and Hospital for Women, holding this position until 1881, when she accepted the chair of gynæcology in the same institution, an honor then first accorded to a woman. In 1889, illness compelled her to resign, and she became consulting physician to the hospital in gynæcology. The work was without compensation, but in doing it, Brinkman was ministering to poor women and also, as she believed contributing to form a public opinion which would open more avenues of usefulness to women.

In 1881, she was chosen professor of diseases of women (gynaecology) in the New York Medical College and Hospital for Women. The trustees were slow to award the honors of the profession to women, even in a woman's college, and Brinkman was among the first to hold such a position. She filled it with success until forced by ill health to resign it, in 1889. Meanwhile, she held other positions, being appointed, in 1886, visiting physician on the medical staff of the New York College for Women, and in 1880, consulting physician to the hospital.

She did a vast amount of gratuitous work for the needy, and labored to improve the condition and advance the cause of women. She gave lectures before women's clubs and societies, including a course of lectures delivered on medical subjects to the young women of the Girls' Friendly Society of St. Thomas, St. James, and Calvary Churches, in New York City. She worked as an associate member of the Girls' Friendly Society of the Episcopal Church. She gave a year of Bible talks to workmen gathered from the street under the auspices of the Galilee Mission of Calvary Church, which mission she helped to organize.

Brinkman was an active member of many State and county societies, both medical and philanthropic, among which were the New York State and County Medical Societies, the Christian League for Promoting Social Purity, the New York Woman Suffrage Society, and the Society for Promoting the Welfare of the Insane. This gratuitous labor for the public was the more noticeable from the fact that, during the greater part of the time in which it was done, she cared for a large and constantly increasing private practice.

Brinkman wrote articles for the medical journals which extended her reputation among the profession. In her special line of work, gynaecology, she was an authority. She used her leisure time in literary work. Her style was clear and marked by terseness, euphony and impressiveness. On the subject in which she was most interested, the physical education of young women, she wrote articles for the North American Review and other leading journals, which attracted wide attention.

== Personal life ==
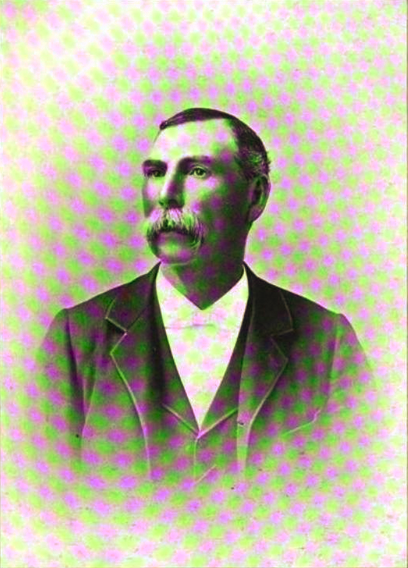
James G. W. Brinkman

In 1875, she married James George Waddell Brinkman, who was born in Augusta, Maine, in 1837, but who, since childhood, was a resident of New York City. In 1894, the Brinkmans came to live in Putnam County, New York, Mr. Brinkman having charge of the city property and works at Double Reservoir I, near Brewster village. This change of residence made it necessary for her to give up the active practice of medicine in New York City.

Dr. Mary A. Brinkman died January 25, 1932, at St. Luke's Home for Aged Women. Burial was at Milltown Rural Cemetery, Brewster, New York.

== Selected works ==
- 1889, "Gynaecological Résumé", Homoeopathic Journal of Obstetrics, Gynaecology and Paedology, Volume 11
- 1890, "A Talk Suggested by Every Day Practice", The North American Journal of Homeopathy, Volume 38
- 1913, "Imagination", Washington News Letter, Volume 19
