= Adelaide Wallerstein =

American physician and translator (1869–1942)

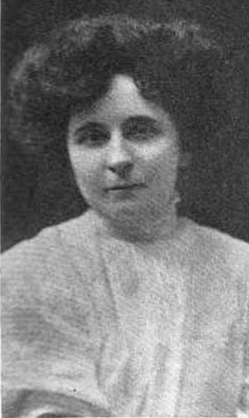
- Adelaide Wallerstein, from a 1908 publication.
- Born: Adelaide Dorn; March 4, 1869; Massachusetts, US
- Died: June 12, 1942 (aged 73); New York City, US
- Other name: Adelaide Dorn McConnell (after 1911)
- Occupations: medical doctor, lawyer, translator, clubwoman

Adelaide Dorn Wallerstein McConnell (March 4, 1869 – June 12, 1942) was an American translator, medical doctor, lawyer, and club woman, based in New York City.

== Early life ==
Adelaide Dorn was born in Worcester, Massachusetts to John Dorn and Margaret Cornish. She had a younger sister, Lillian, and a brother, John. She graduated from law school at New York University in 1898, and earned her medical degree at the New York Medical College and Hospital for Women in 1905.

== Career ==
Wallerstein practiced medicine from an office in her New York home, and in 1905 founded a free clinic, the East Side Clinic for Children. She was president of the clinic for 25 years, until it closed in 1931. She also translated French literature into English.

"There is no better-known clubwoman in New York than Mrs. Harry Wallerstein," noted the cover of Broadway Weekly in 1904. She was president of the Woman's Legal Aid Society when it began in 1898, and president of the Adelaide Wallerstein Auxiliary of the National Army Relief Association for Porto Rico; the latter organization sent books, blankets, and disinfectants to American soldiers during the Spanish–American War. During World War I she organized a women's group to assist the Marines. She was also active in the Daughters of the American Revolution and the Women's Press Club of New York. In 1907 she headed the Philocalian Society, a group of club women who sought to discourage young women from drinking, low-cut gowns, and late-night socializing in New York.

Adelaide Wallerstein was president of the Rubenstein Club, from 1904 until a controversial ouster in 1909. In response, she founded the New York Mozart Society; the society's chorus performed at the White House in 1911, with Arthur Claassen conducting. She was president of the Mozart Society from 1909 to 1937.

== Personal life ==
Adelaide Dorn first married businessman Henry "Harry" Wallerstein; they separated in 1910 and were divorced in January 1911. When Wallerstein died in 1915, he left his entire estate to his ex-wife. In 1911 she married businessman Noble McConnell; they remained married until her death in 1942. Congressman Chris Shays is her grand-nephew; he is the grandson of Adelaide McConnell's sister, Lillian Cecile Dorn Shays.
