= Camille A. Clare =

American obstetrician and gynecologist

Academic background
- Education: BSc, Psychobiology, 1992, Binghamton University; MD, 1997, Albert Einstein College of Medicine; MPH, 2011, New York Medical College

Camille Angela Clare is an American obstetrician and gynecologist. She is the Chair of the Department of Obstetrics and Gynecology at SUNY Downstate Medical Center and Professor at the College of Medicine and the School of Public Health.

== Early life and education ==
Clare was born to two Jamaican immigrants in New York City, New York. She completed her undergraduate degree in psychobiology from Binghamton University in 1992 and her medical degree from the Albert Einstein College of Medicine in 1997. Following this, Clare completed her residency in obstetrics and gynecology at the University of Buffalo in 2001. During her time at Binghamton, she was a member of their Charles Drew Pre-Health Society. Since November 2008, Clare participated in the Charles Drew Alumni Advisory Panel, which is composed of alumni members.

== Career ==
Following her formal education, Clare joined the faculty at the New York Medical College. While working there as an associate professor of Obstetrics and Gynecology, she also directed Resident Research. In 2016, Clare was named the interim associate dean of diversity and inclusion for the School of Medicine. The following year, she was honored by the Harlem Fine Arts Show for her "professional excellence, contributions to the field of medicine, and efforts to groom the next generation of medical professionals." In 2018, Clare was honored with the 2018 Gender Equity Award from the College’s chapter of the American Medical Women’s Association.

During the COVID-19 pandemic, Clare became the Chair of the Department of Obstetrics and Gynecology and Professor at the College of Medicine and the School of Public Health at the SUNY Downstate Medical Center. Later, she also received the American College of Obstetricians and Gynecologists's Outstanding District Service Award for "her commitment to addressing health inequity and health care disparities."
