= Mary E. Green =

American physician (1841–1910)

Dr. Mary E. Green M.D.
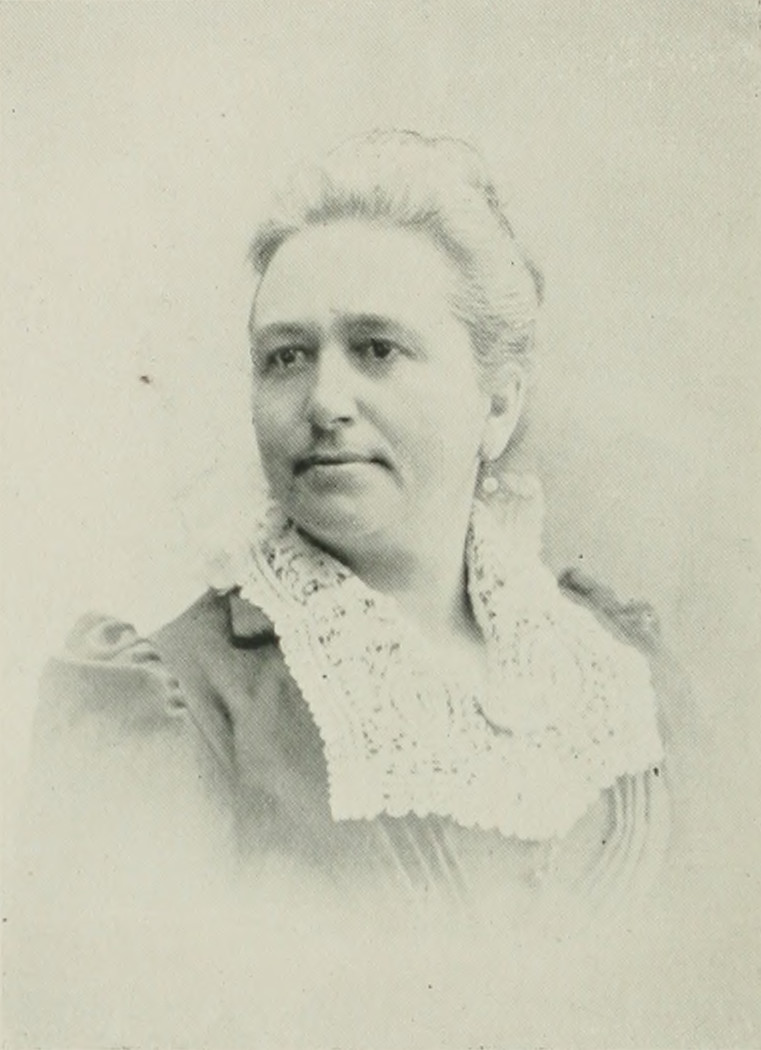
- Portrait photo from A Woman of the Century
- Born: Mary Elizabeth Green; August 6, 1844; Machias, New York, U.S.
- Died: February 9, 1910 (aged 65); Seattle, Washington, U.S.
- Education: Woman's Medical College of Pennsylvania
- Occupation: Physician
- Known for: President, American Household Economic Association
- Spouse: Alonzo Green (m. 1866)

Mary E. Green (1841–1910) was an American physician, the first woman admitted to membership in the New York Medical Association. Green served as President of the American Household Economic Association.

== Early life and education ==
Mary Elizabeth Green was born in Machias, New York, August 6, 1844. Both her parents, Allen Green and Emeline (Wicks) Green, were of New England ancestry. They moved to Michigan when she was very young, and with limited means, they were obliged to endure the challenges of a pioneer life. As there were no brothers in the family, Mary worked both indoors and outdoors, preferring outdoors work, until, the house being built and a few acres about it cleared, she was allowed to think about education.

She went to a neighbor's, several miles away, where she worked for her board and began to attend school. At the age of 14, she passed the required examination and began to teach, her salary being US$2 a week, with the privilege of boarding at others' houses. She was soon able to enter Olivet College. There she earned her own way, mostly by doing housework, and partially so in Oberlin College, which she attended later.

While yet in her teens, she realized the necessity of choosing some life work for herself, and as she desired to pursue the study of medicine, she quietly determined to do so. Undaunted by the criticism of her friends, in 1865, after one year's study with a physician, Green entered the New York Medical College. She was soon chosen assistant in the chemical laboratory, and besides that work, she was present every evening, making the dissections to be used on the following day by the demonstrator of anatomy. She entered Bellevue Hospital and remained there, in spite of sexual harassment. On account of its hospital advantages, the next year she entered the Woman's Medical College of Pennsylvania, and for two years was an intern of the hospital. In 1868, she was graduated from that college with honor, her thesis being entitled "Medical jurisprudence."

== Career ==
In 1868, she went to New York City, and engaged in active practice.

Outside of office hours, Green's time was occupied with charitable work, as she was visiting physician to the Midnight Mission, the Five Points Mission, Dr. Blackwell's Infirmary, and the Prison Home for Women. By personal effort, she organized and built up a large dispensary for women and children in a neglected quarter of the city, which was so successful that, after the first year in which over 2,000 patients were cared for, it received State and city support. Green's consulting physicians and surgeons were considered the most eminent in the city.

In 1870, she delivered part of a course of lectures on medical subjects in connection with Dr. Elizabeth Blackwell, Dr. Willard Parker, and others. The year after her graduation, Green's name was presented for membership to the New York Medical Society, and after a stormy discussion she was admitted, being the first woman in the U.S. to win that opportunity for broader work. Soon after, she became a member of the New York Medico-Legal Society.

Wishing to pursue a higher course in the study of chemistry, she applied for admission to Columbia College, but her request was not granted. She entered upon a course of evening lectures given by Professor Charles F. Chandler in the College of Pharmacy, and, although she could not graduate, as she was a woman, the knowledge was gained. During those years of constant mental and physical work, Green became the mother of two children.

While in New York, she attended the Cooper Institute lectures regularly, and was otherwise interested in both literary and art work. In Cincinnati, she took up wood-carving.

Green was twice elected health officer of Charlotte, Michigan. She was elected three times as a delegate to the American Medical Association by the State Medical Society.

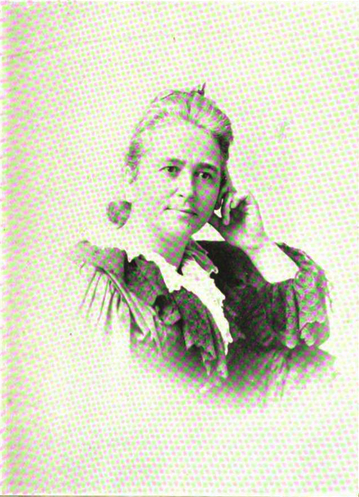
Picture of Mary E. Green from 1895

At the World's Columbian Exposition (1893), Green served as Judge of Food Products. In 1894-95, she served as President of the Women's Club of Charlotte, Michigan.

In 1897, Green served as the third President of the American Household Economic Association, which had been founded in 1893. By this time, the organization had become generally recognized through the efforts of State vice-presidents who in turn presented the subject and supplied literature to the clubs and educational institutions of their representative states. During Green's presidency, Household Economics was given a place on the program of the conventions of the General Federation of Women's Clubs, and also at many of the meetings of the State Federations. Green was called upon to speak at these meetings as also were many other workers in the field. The subject met with a positive reception at the Denver Biennial of the General Federation, and the women throughout the West were ready to enlist in this enterprise.

She had charge of the diet kitchens established by the Red Cross for sick soldiers in the south during the Spanish–American War (1898).

== Personal life ==
In 1866, she married her cousin, Alonzo Green, then a practicing lawyer in New York City. She moved in 1873 to Charlotte, Michigan, where three more children were born.

In 1902, she gained international notoriety in a lawsuit to recover her two grandsons from the Theosophist colony at Point Loma, California. The court held with Green and the boys were brought to their father, John J. Bohn, proprietor of the Hotel World, Chicago. In 1905, Green relocated from Charlotte, Michigan to Tulsa, Oklahoma, later going to Seattle, Washington.

Mary E. Green died in Seattle, February 9, 1910.

== Selected works ==
- "The New Era in Food Supplies", Modern Housekeeping, 1895
- "Milk, Butter and Cheese From the Standpoint of Health and Economy", Annual Report of the Michigan Dairymen's Association, Volume 13, 1897
- "Household Economics", The Chautauquan, Volume 26, 1898
- "Housekeeping in the Army. Glimpses of Life at Fort Thomas.", The American Kitchen Magazine, Volume 12, February 1900
