= Isabella Vandervall =

African-American physician

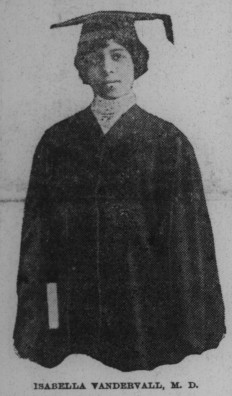
- Born: 1894; New Jersey
- Died: 1989 (aged 94–95)
- Education: New York Medical College
- Occupations: Physician, Gynaecologist
- Notable work: 'Some Problems of the Colored Woman Physician'

Isabella Vandervall (1894–1989) was an African-American physician, gynecologist and a prominent advocate for the birth control movement in New York City. She attended the New York Medical College for Women, from which she graduated at the top of her class.

== Life ==
Isabella Vandervall was the daughter of Isabella Vandervall (née Braun) and James Nelson Vandervall, a businessman and community leader in Orange, New Jersey. Isabella was an outstanding student, and graduated high school at 16.

In 1917, she married Dr. William Randolph R. Granger Jr., who had studied at Dartmouth College and came from a family of doctors. They adopted a daughter, Mary Isabella, together and were later described as 'one of Brooklyn's most popular couples'.

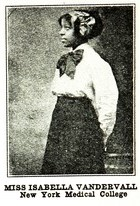
Isabella Vandervall in The Crisis, July 1912

. Vandervall was a member of Delta Sigma Theta, she joined the Sorority through its Alpha Beta chapter, now New York Alumnae.

== Career ==
In the 19th and early 20th centuries, opportunities for African-American women in medical roles were rare, but during the 1910s and 1920s, many states passed laws requiring the completion of an internship in order to gain a medical license. Vandervall graduated from New York Medical College for Women in 1915, and was subsequently rejected as an intern by four hospitals, despite graduating at the top of her class (she had obtained an average of 97.8%). More than once she was encouraged or accepted by a hospital, before an in-person meeting revealed her race, and she was dismissed. This was the case on being offered an internship at the Hospital for Women and Children in Syracuse, New York. In an article for the Woman's Medical Journal, Vandervall wrote:

I found the hospital; I found the superintendent. She asked me what I wanted. I told her I was Dr. Vandervall, the new interne. She simply stared and said not a word. Finally, when she came to her senses, she said to me: 'You can't come here; we can't have you here! You are colored! You will have to go back.'

She was only able to practice because she had obtained licenses in New York and New Jersey prior to the internship requirement coming into effect. Vandervall described the 'almost insurmountable' challenge the laws now presented to other women of colour:

For many years the colored woman physician has practiced and prospered, but now, in this twentieth century, this era when women in general are forging ahead, and the woman physician in particular is coming into great prominence, a huge stumbling block, one which seems almost insurmountable, has suddenly been placed in the path of the colored woman physician. This stumbling block is a new law, the law of compulsory internship, which requires the physician to have at least one year’s service in a recognized hospital before being allowed to take the state licensing exam.

In 1920, of 3,855 black doctors in the US, 'less than half of one percent were women'. There had been 90 black women practicing medicine in 1890; by 1920 the number was 65. The response to Vandervall's article in the Woman's Medical Journal was lukewarm. In a response, under the title 'A Call to Arms', fellow doctor Emma Wheat Gilmore wrote:

One can hardly escape an impulse of keen pity for this young woman who has qualified as a physician, but is deprived of the right to practice medicine in her resident State [of Pennsylvania] because she is unable to fulfill the requirements of the law on account of color prejudice.

However, she argued, it was on grounds of qualification, not race, that Vandervall had been refused.

Vandervall went into private practice, and became known as a promoter of the birth control movement in New York. She worked as a clinician at the Mothers' Health Center, at the Harlem Branch of the National Urban League.
