= Joel Kupersmith =

American physician

Joel Kupersmith, M.D., an American physician, is the former dean of the Texas Tech University School of Medicine, and head of the Office of Research and Development of the Department of Veterans Affairs. He is the former director, Veterans Initiatives and professor of medicine at Georgetown University.

== Early life ==
Kupersmith was born in New York City and graduated from the Bronx High School of Science, Union College in Schenectady, New York and New York Medical College. After serving as a lieutenant (MC) in the U.S. Navy, and residency in internal medicine at New York Medical College he completed his cardiology fellowship at Beth Israel Medical Center/Harvard Medical School.

Kupersmith's research interests, which began when he was a research associate in pharmacology at Columbia University's College of Physician Surgeons have included basic and clinical electrophysiology and heart rhythm abnormalities. They focused on the unique effects of antiarrhythmic drugs in ischemic tissue, ion sensitive electrodes to understand the heart's electrical activity, and cost-effectiveness in heart disease. He has published over 170 papers.

== Academic medicine ==
Kupersmith joined the faculty of the Mt. Sinai School of Medicine in 1974, where he rose to the rank of professor and initiated one of the early clinical cardiac electrophysiology sections and a clinical pharmacology section.

Kupersmith then became chief of cardiology and Cooke Professor of Medicine at the University of Louisville, and professor and chairperson of the department of medicine at Michigan State University. In 1997, he was appointed dean of the School of Medicine at Texas Tech University and of its Graduate School of Biomedical Sciences, Vice President for clinical affairs, and CEO of its faculty practice. He was involved in the initial efforts to establish what is now the Paul L. Foster School of Medicine in El Paso and initiated a 4/year MD/MBA program, the second in the U.S.

Kupersmith has served as a site visit chair for the Liaison Committee on Medical Education (LCME), was a member of the AAMC Task Force on Fraud and Abuse, and was elected to the Governing Council, Medical School Section, of the American Medical Association.

== Health care policy and research ==
Following his tenure at Texas Tech, Kupersmith was a Petersdorf scholar at the Association of American Medical Colleges (AAMC) and scholar-in-residence at the Institute of Medicine (now the National Academy of Medicine). Here, he led a project on how to fund and oversee Comparative Effectiveness Research which resulted in a recommendation of a public-private consortium to engage all relevant stakeholders in establishing priorities, funding research, and balancing competing interests, ideas which were later the prototype for the Patient Centered Outcomes Research Institute.

== VA research ==
In 2005, Kupersmith was appointed CRADO, Office of Research and Development (ORD) within the Veterans Health Administration beginning an 8-year tenure. He started the Million Veterans Program which has a goal of collecting genetic information from veterans and linking that information to the VA electronic health record. It has become one of the world's largest genetic databases.

Dr. Kupersmith also implemented laboratory infrastructure improvement and new methods of developing and conducting research, mandating engagement of health system leaders thus assuring its relevance. He initiated one of the early Central Institutional Review Boards and established a VA young investigator award with Historically Black Colleges and Universities.

A component of the Office of Research and Development, (the Clinical Research Pharmacy Coordinating Center) won the Malcolm Baldrige National Quality Award.

== Veterans Advocacy ==
Kupersmith was the former director, Veterans Initiatives and professor of medicine, Georgetown University. In this capacity, working with Gen. (Ret) George Casey, former Army Chief of Staff, he initiated the Veterans Creed, a statement of veteran's principles, and organized 17 major Veterans Service Organizations to adopt and utilize it. In this position, He has also advised ref, advised on how to make civilian health systems more receptive to veterans and other aspects of veterans’ healthcare.

== Awards ==
- Alumni Association Distinguished Achievement Award, New York Medical College, 1992
- Affirmative Action Award, University of Louisville

== Federal Panels ==
Dr. Kupersmith was a member of Federal Coordinating Council for Comparative Effectiveness Research, Council of the National Center for the Advancement of Translational Science of NI, the Federal Collaboration on Health Disparities Research, the National Science and Technology Council Committee on Homeland and National Security, The Biomarkers Consortium of NIH, and the Council on Science, Office of Science and Technology Policy, White House.

== Books and publications ==
- Kupersmith, J, Deedwania P (eds), The Pharmacologic Management of Heart Disease, Williams and Wilkins, Baltimore, 1997.
- Singer I, Kupersmith J (eds), Clinical Manual of Electrophysiology, Williams and Wilkins, Baltimore, 1993.
- Kupersmith J, Achieving Accountability: A Proactive Process for Academic Medical Centers, Association of Academic Medical Centers, Washington DC 2005.

== Selected works ==
- Kupersmith J, Antman EM, Hoffman BF: In vivo electrophysiologic effects of lidocaine in canine acute myocardial infarction. Circ Res 36:84-91, 1975.
- Kline RP, Cohen I, Falk R, Kupersmith J: Activity dependent extracellular K+ fluctuation in canine Purkinje fiber. Nature 286:68-71, 1980

== Policy ==
- Kupersmith J, Sung N, Genel M, Slavkin H, Califf R, Bonow R, Sherwood L, Reame N, Catanese V, Baase C, Feussner J, Dobs A, Tilson H, Reece EA: Creating a new structure for research on health care effectiveness. J Invest Med 53:67-72, 2005.
- Kupersmith J: Quality of care in teaching hospitals: A literature review. Acad Med 80:458-466, 2005.
- Kupersmith J, Francis J, Kerr E, Krein S, Pogach L, Kolodner RM, Perlin JB: Advancing Evidence-based care for diabetes: Lessons from the veterans health administration. Health Affairs 26:w156-w168, 2007.
- Kupersmith J, O'Leary TJ: The million veteran program: Building VA's mega-database for genomic medicine. Health Affairs, Nov 19, 2012.
- Kupersmith J: A new role for the Veterans Health Administration Health Affairs, Posted March 18, 2016.
- Kupersmith J, O’Hanlon M: Gulf War Illness 25 Years After Desert Storm, Posted August 4, 2016.
- Kupersmith J: Publication in 2005 recommended the prototype for the Patient-Centered Outcomes Research Institute. J Comp Eff Res 6:95. 2017
- Kupersmith J: 12 Ways Civilian Healthcare Can Meet its Social Responsibility to Veterans Health Affairs July 23, 2018

== Example News Items ==
- http://www.nbc33tv.com/news/national-news/dna-from-veterans-used-for-new-study
- http://www.thepharmaletter.com/file/107315/nasal-insulin-spray-shows-promise-in-treatment-of-alzheimers.html
- http://www.medicalnewstoday.com/releases/200114.php.
- https://globenewswire.com/news-release/2018/06/10/1519289/0/en/Veteran-Service-Organizations-Establish-a-Veteran-s-Creed.html
- https://www.military.com/daily-news/2018/06/18/veterans-groups-are-now-pledging-serve-community-new-creed.html
