= Laura Starr Ware Wilkinson =

American home economist (1843–1921)

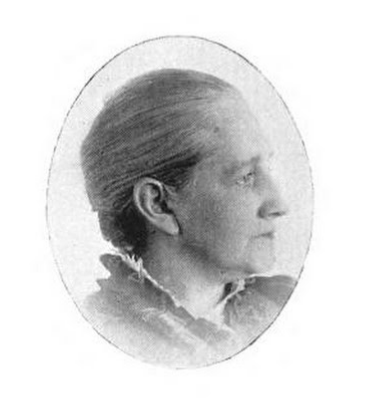
Laura S. Wilkinson

Laura Starr Ware Wilkinson (also known as Mrs. John Wilkinson; June 20, 1843 - November 14, 1921) was an American home economist and the first president of the National Household Economic Association, which promoted the new field of domestic economy.

== Early years and education ==
Laura Starr Ware was born in Deerfield, Massachusetts, June 20, 1843, the daughter of Edwin Ware and Harriet S. Ware. She was educated in Deerfield schools and Mrs. David Mach's school, Belmont, Massachusetts.

== Career ==
Her special work was in the interest of domestic economy. During the World's Columbian Exposition she chaired the Congress of Household Economics, and organized the National Columbian Household Economic Association, which proposed to have a vice-president in each state, and a chairman of household economics in each county in each state. Upon formation of the National Household Economic Association, Wilkinson served as its first president, till 1896.

== Personal life ==
On November 20, 1867, she married John Wilkinson, of Syracuse, New York. She traveled in England, Italy, Switzerland, Germany and America. In religious faith, Wilkinson was a Unitarian. She resided in Chicago, Illinois.
