= Isabella M. Pettet =

American medical doctor (1848-1912)

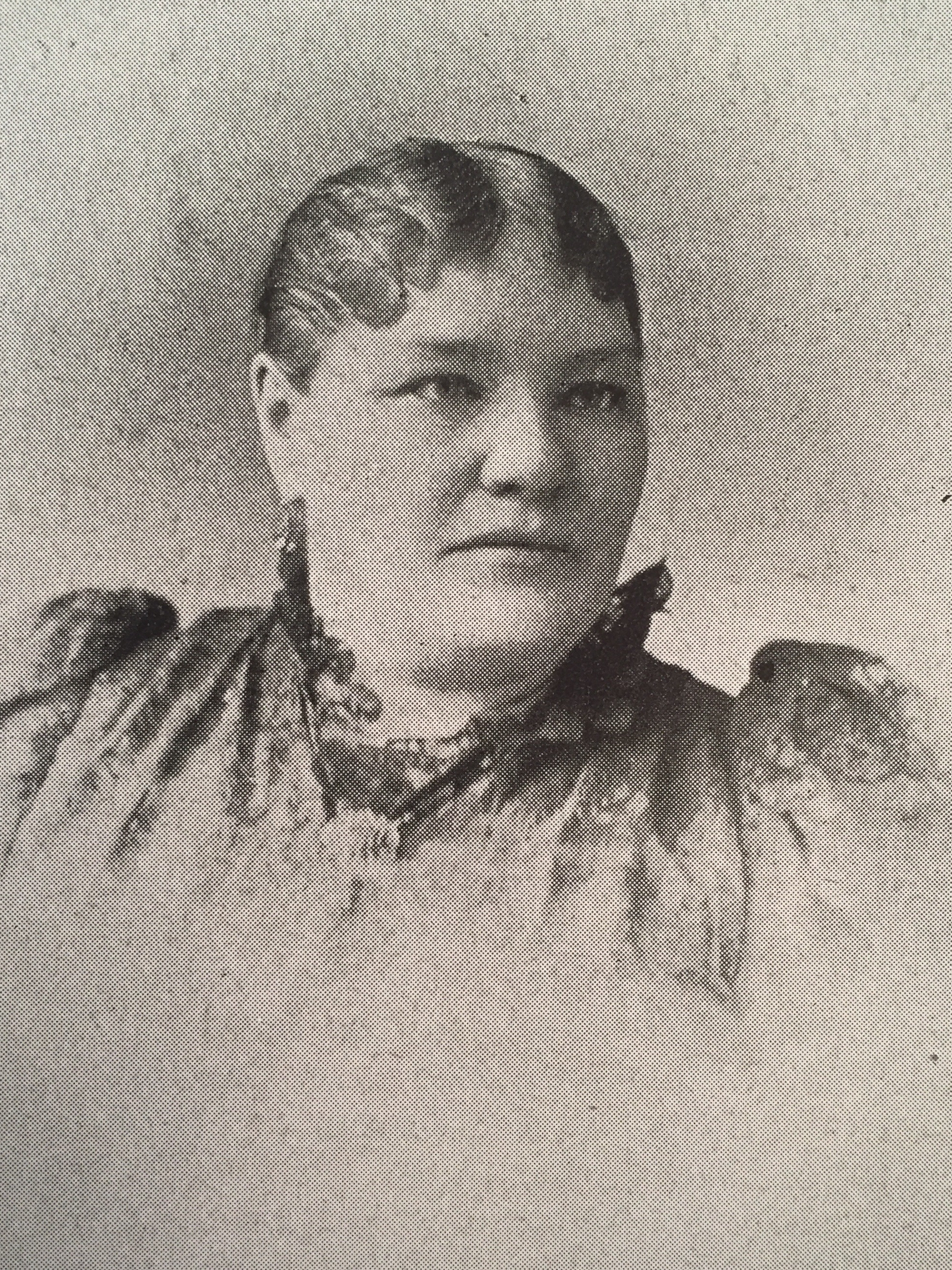
- Isabella Pettet
- Born: June 6, 1848; Duchy of Holstein
- Died: September 8, 1912 (aged 64); Middle Village, New York
- Occupation: Physician

Isabella M. Pettet (June 6, 1848 – September 8, 1912) was an American medical doctor.

== Early life ==
Isabella M. Pettet was born in the Duchy of Holstein on June 6, 1848.

== Personal life and career ==
She moved to the United States in 1865, locating in Milwaukee, Wisconsin, where she became engaged in voluntary influence and breathe a more elevated atmosphere mission work connected with the Methodist Church, of art. She had one daughter, Edna May Pettet. She went to New York City in 1874, afterwards New York Port Society, where she remained for three years.

She started to study medicine in 1878 and graduated with honors in 1881 in the New York Medical College and Hospital for Women. She had an office in her residence in East 15th Street, a private dispensary in East 23rd Street and an office in Newark, New Jersey, visiting the latter place two days in the week.

She was a member of the New York County Medical Society, and was on the medical staff of the New York Medical College and Hospital for Women.

She died on September 8, 1912, and is buried at Fresh Pond Crematory and Columbarium, Middle Village, New York. At her death she left the property of one house and cash for a total of $1,500.00 ($1,500 in 1912 are $36,674.99 in 2017).
