= Harry J. Buncke =

American plastic surgeon

Harry J. Buncke (1922 – May 18, 2008) was an American plastic surgeon who has been called "The Father of Microsurgery" for his contributions in the history and development of reconstructive microsurgical procedures. He is a past president of the American Society for Surgery of the Hand, the International Society of Reconstructive Microsurgery, and the American Association of Plastic Surgery. He served as a clinical professor of surgery at both Stanford University and the University of California - San Francisco. He was the author of 15 movies and television tapes, four surgical textbooks, and more than 400 peer-reviewed publications.

== Education ==
Buncke attended Lehigh University in Bethlehem, Pennsylvania, and earned his medical degree from the New York Medical College in 1951.

== Career ==
Buncke's work began in a laboratory which he set up in his garage, using instruments and sutures he developed. In 1964, he reported a rabbit ear replantation to the Plastic Surgery Research Council meeting in Kansas City, Kansas. This was the first report of successfully using blood vessels on millimeter in size, an achievement previously considered to be technically improbable.

In 1966, Buncke and colleagues reported the transplantation of a monkey great toe to hand using microsurgery, a second landmark that ushered in an era where replantation of amputated digits and extremities was more widely performed.

With Donald McLean, Buncke performed the first successful microvascular transplant using omentum to fill a large scalp defect In 1969. 1970, Buncke founded the Buncke Clinic at the Davies Medical Center in San Francisco, California. Surgeons at this clinic went on to accomplish many 'firsts', including a human toe-to-hand transplant, scalp replantations, serratus-combined-latissimus microvascular transplants, four-digit replantion and, in 1997, the replantation of a severed tongue.

Bunke's name and image were included on a USPS stamp.
