= National Household Economic Association =

- Predecessor: National Columbian Household Economic Association
- Merged into: Committee of Household Economics of the General Federation of Women's Clubs
- Formation: 1893
- Dissolved: 1903
- Headquarters: Chicago, Illinois, US

National Household Economic Association (1893-1903) was a 19th-century American women's organization which promoted the new field of home economics.

This association was incorporated March 16, 1893, under the name of the National Columbian Household Economic Association. The articles of incorporation and by-laws were adopted March 22, 1893, and went into effect at the annual meeting of October 11, 1893. The Association voted to drop the word 'Columbian' at the meeting held in April, 1894.

The management was vested in a board of 16 directors, with headquarters in Chicago, but composed of members from all States. The association held annual meetings. All women could become members of this association by the payment of an annual fee of US$1. The association worked mainly not by establishing new clubs, but by inducing existing woman's clubs to establish departments of household economics, for the study of how better to manage the home, educate better servants, and have more healthy food.

== Objectives ==
The objectives, as declared in its constitution, were:

1. To awaken the public mind to the importance of establishing bureaus of information where there can be an exchange of wants and needs between employer and employed, in every department of home and social life.
2. To promote among members of the association a more scientific knowledge of the economic value of various foods and fuels; a more intelligent understanding of correct plumbing and drainage in our homes, as well as need for pure water and good light in a sanitarily built house.
3. To secure skilled labor in every department in our homes, and to organize schools of household science and service."

== History ==
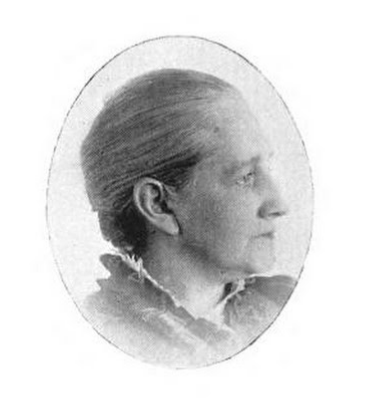
Laura S. Wilkinson

The Women's Congress of the Chicago Exposition of 1893, awakened the public to the fact that matters pertaining to the household had not kept up with the procession of progress. Therefore, a day was appointed in which to investigate this neglected science and the result was the organization of an association aimed to benefit the home makers of this country and to be National in scope. The organization took as its name The National Household Economic Association, and Laura Starr Ware Wilkinson of Chicago, was elected its first president, and Ellen Martin Henrotin, honorary president. Mrs. Wilkinson proved to be an efficient executive leader, and with the assistance of Henrotin and many other well known women, was able to induce the Women's Clubs of the country, to take an active interest in all education pertaining to the betterment of the home. The Association planned to work especially through women's clubs.

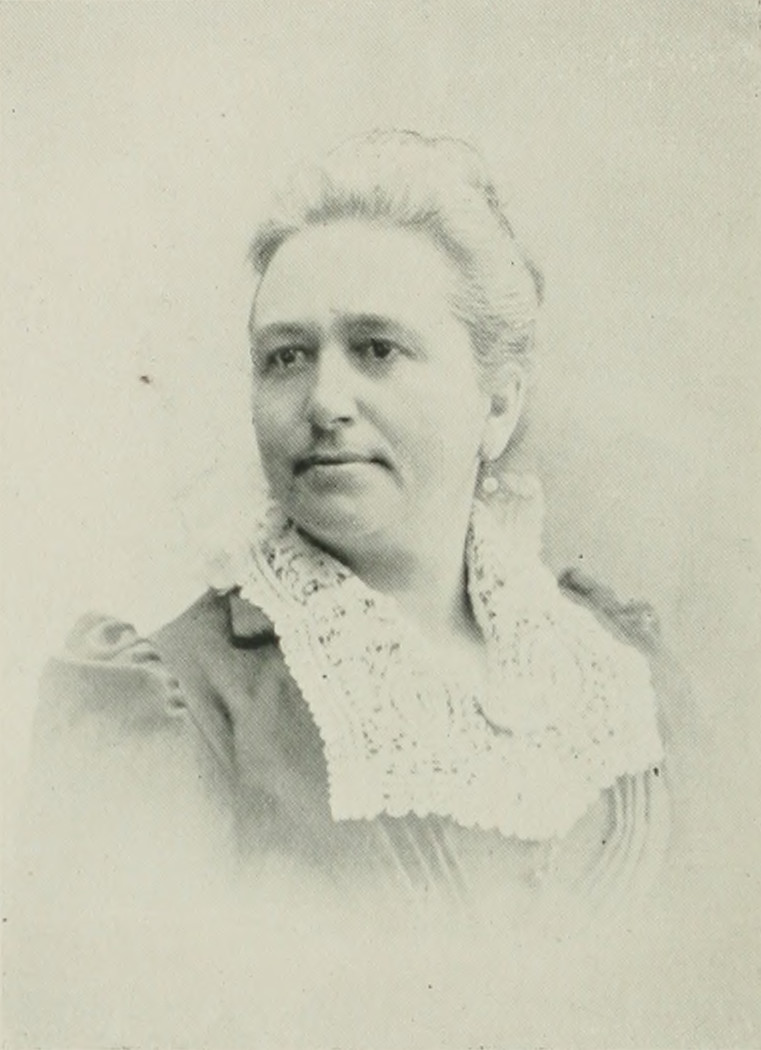
Mary E. Green

Wilkinson was followed as president, by Elizabeth Boynton Harbert, of Illinois, and Dr. Mary E. Green, of Michigan, succeeded Harbart as president. By this time, the organization had become generally recognized through the efforts of State vice-presidents who in turn presented the subject and supplied literature to the clubs and educational institutions of their representative states. During Green's presidency, Household Economics was given a place on the program of the conventions of the General Federation of Women's Clubs, and also at many of the meetings of the State Federations. Green was called upon to speak at these meetings as also were many other workers in the field. The subject met with an enthusiastic reception at the Denver Biennial of the General Federation, and the women throughout the West were ready to enlist in this new, yet very old, enterprise. Linda Hull Larned, of New York State, succeeded Green and under her regime, the subject found favor at all the Biennial conventions during the four years that she was in office, with 35 States, as well as Canada, represented by vice-presidents. Larned not only presented the subject at these National and State meetings, but was invited by Mr. Peck, to the Paris Exposition, to take part in the series of Congresses that were held in the Palais de Congress during that summer and was given a prominent place on the program of Women's Works and Institutions at this Congress.

The Association held its annual meetings during the ten years of its existence, in different states, and at the invitation of local organizations, its last meeting was held in Toledo, Ohio, October, 1903. As by this time the objects and aims of the Association had become thoroughly incorporated in the work of the General and State Federations of Women's Clubs, and as the Lake Placid Conference was now doing much better work along the same lines, it was decided at the Toledo meeting to merge the work of the Association into that of the Committee of Household Economics of the General Federation of Women's Clubs. The following year the first report of a committee on Household Economics was made at a General Federation Convention, at the meeting in St. Louis in 1904.

The National Household Economic Association published and circulated annual reports containing summaries of work and progress in the States, and from time to time, published Outlines of Study, and also addresses of importance given at its annual conventions. The Association was entertained two or three times in Chicago, and once in Atlanta, in Toronto, in Buffalo, in Milwaukee and Toledo.

By 1903, there were many schools of Domestic Science in flourishing existence which owed their inspiration to the efforts of the workers in the National Household Economic Association, and in many towns and cities, it was more or less instrumental in introducing manual training and domestic science for girls in the public schools.

The organization disbanded in 1903.

== Standing committees ==
- Committee on Sanitary Condition of the Home Correct Plumbing and Ventilation, Light, Heat, etc. The duties of this committee shall be to establish home science clubs and to make a study of sanitary science.
- Committee on Cooking Schools, Industrial Schools, Housekeepers' Emergency Bureau, Cooperative Laundries, Cooperative Bakeries, Training School for Servants, Kitchen Gardens and Public Kindergartens, Diet Kitchens, Mothers' and Nurse Girls' classes, and Training School for Nurses. The duties of this committee shall be to keep itself informed of the work of each school and institution, and to direct all who wish to know where and at what hour one may visit these schools.
- Committee on Food Supply. The duties of this committee shall be to prepare a descriptive list of wholesale and retail foods, such as meat, vegetables, butter, eggs, etc.; to compare New York and Chicago with other markets, and furnish statements of what articles of food are most desirable to buy, either in large or small quantities, with household recipes for cooking and all other matters relating to household economics.
- Committee on Housekeepers' Clubs. The duties of this committee shall be to formulate plans to simplify housework in village communities, to suggest plans for cooperation in laundries, bakeries, and kitchens, to discuss plans for profitable market gardening, poultry and egg-raising on a small scale, and to furnish information on all topics connected with housework.
- Committee on Sewing. The duties of this committee shall be to keep itself informed of the work done in various schools where sewing is taught, and give outlines of the methods used.
- Press Committee. It shall be the duty of this committee to secure the publication of notes concerning the National Household Economic Association in some journal or periodical in the North, South, East, West, and Middle sections of the country, in order to keep alive public interest in the science of household economics; each member of the committee taking charge of the matter in her own section.
