= Westchester Medical Center =

- Westchester County Health Care Corporation

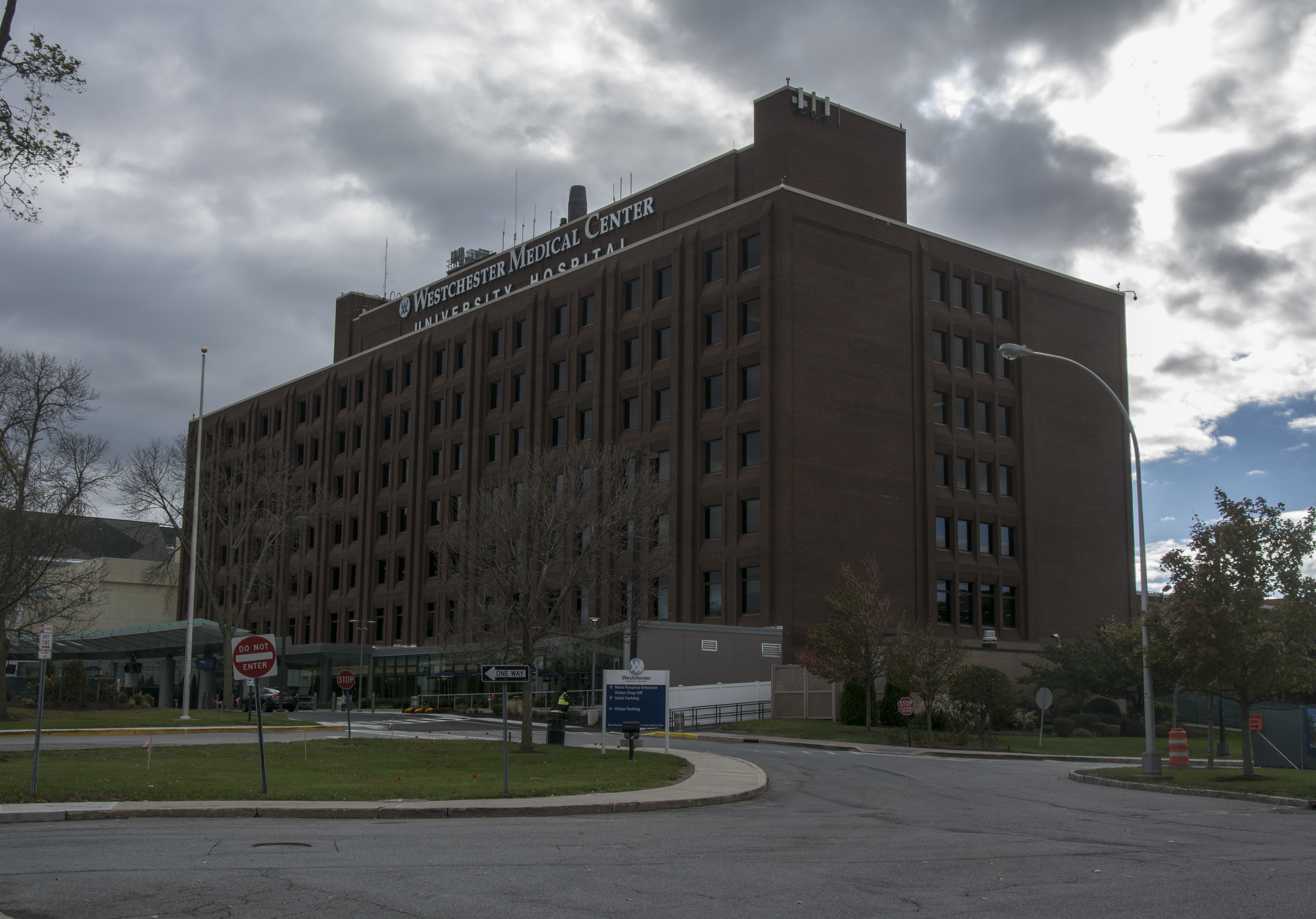

Geography
- Location: 100 Woods Road, Valhalla, New York, United States
- Coordinates: 41°05′10″N 73°48′20″W

Organization
- Type: Acute Care
- Affiliated university: New York Medical College

Services
- Emergency department: Level 1 Trauma Center
- Beds: 652

Helipads
- Helipad: FAA LID: 7NK8

History
- Founded: 1977

Links
- Website: Official website
- Lists: Hospitals in New York State

Westchester Medical Center University Hospital (WMC), formerly Grasslands Hospital, is an 895-bed Regional Trauma Center providing health services to residents of the Hudson Valley, northern New Jersey, and southern Connecticut. It is known for having one of the highest case mix index rates of all hospitals in the United States. 652 beds are at the hospital's primary location in Valhalla, while the other 243 beds are at the MidHudson Regional Hospital campus in Poughkeepsie. It is organized as Westchester County Health Care Corporation, and is a New York State public-benefit corporation.

Westchester Medical Center is the primary academic medical center and University Hospital of New York Medical College. Many of New York Medical College's faculty provide patient care, teach, and conduct research at the adjacent campus. Westchester Medical Center provides various specialty services to patients, hosts one of the leading kidney and liver transplant programs in New York, and is home to Maria Fareri Children's Hospital, the only all-specialty children's hospital in the region.

== Organization ==
Westchester County Health Care Corporation is guided by an 18-member board of directors, many of whom are appointed by the New York State Governor. Its management team is headed by president and CEO David Lubarsky, who is also on the board and reports to the board. In 2017, it had operating expenses of $1.379 billion, an outstanding debt of $670.27 million, and a level of staffing of 3,342 people.

== History ==
Originally purchased in 1915, the site which would eventually become Westchester Medical Center was first used as a United States Army hospital during World War I. In 1920, the Army turned the hospital over to the Westchester County government which renamed it Grasslands Hospital. In the 1920s and 1930s, Grasslands Hospital specialized in treating adults and children with tuberculosis, polio, scarlet fever, and diphtheria and later became known for its cardiovascular services and became one of the first public institutions to establish a renal dialysis unit. Grasslands Hospital was closed in 1977 to make way for its modern replacement, the newly built regional academic medical center then known as Westchester County Medical Center. In 1998, Westchester Medical Center became an independent institution after being spun off from the county government as an independent public benefit corporation known as the Westchester County Health Care Corporation.

== Clinical and specialty services ==
Maria Fareri Children's Hospital

With 900 physicians, Westchester Medical Center specializes in many different services.

- Maria Fareri Children's Hospital: The only all-specialty children's hospital in the region. The hospital treats infants, children, teens, and young adults aged 0–21. Pediatric specialists, including pediatric neurosurgeons, open heart surgeons, cardiologists, oncologists and infectious disease specialists, contribute to MFCH's status as housing the only regional neonatal intensive and pediatric care units in the Hudson Valley. MFCH also has one of the largest pediatric corneal transplant programs in the nation.
- Trauma and burn center: The hospital is the Hudson Valley's only Level I Adult trauma center and the region's only Level I pediatric trauma center is housed at Maria Fareri Children's Hospital. February 2024 saw the verification of WMC's burn program by the American Burn Association as an adult and pediatric center.
- Transplant center: Offering evaluation and treatment for patients of all ages who require kidney, liver, heart, corneal and bone marrow transplants.
- Heart center: Known for its cardiac surgery and cardiac catheterization programs, as well as its Hypertrophic Cardiomyopathy National Center of Excellence, the heart center at Westchester Medical Center offers cardiovascular services to patients of all ages.
- Cancer center: A player in cancer education and translational research, the cancer center provides diagnostic, preventive and therapeutic cancer programs and services.
- Neuroscience center: Providing neurosurgical and neurological services to both adults and children, the center features "knifeless" brain surgery, a comprehensive epilepsy program and a cerebrovascular center.
- Behavioral health center: provides mental health and behavioral care such as treating individuals with severe mental disorders. The unit also includes pediatric and geriatric care.

== Awards and recognition ==
- Awarded the 2010 IPRO Patient Safety Quality Award
- In 2009 named one of the 100 top hospitals in the nation for improved performance by Thomson Reuters
- Ranked fourth in New York State for overall bariatric surgery by HealthGrades in 2011. Previously received the HealthGrades Bariatric Surgery Excellence Award for 2007/2008, 2008/2009, and 2009/2010
- One of 25 hospitals to receive the American Heart Association's 2008 Triple Performance Achievement Award

== Milestones ==
- In 2017 a surgical team led by Drs. Samir Pandya and Whitney McBride separated a pair of ischiopagus twins. The surgery lasted 21 hours.
- In 2009 Westchester Medical Center installed a 256-slice computed tomography (CT) scanner, the first of its kind in the Hudson Valley.
- In 2008 Children's Hospital physician Dr. M. Fevzi Ozkaynak helped lead a study that discovered new treatment for neuroblastoma, the most common cancer diagnosed in the first year of life.
- In 2008 Westchester Medical Center physicians completed a rare combination heart/liver transplant.

== Expansion ==
=== MidHudson Regional Hospital ===
On May 9, 2014, WMC completed its purchase of St. Francis Hospital in Poughkeepsie, New York, renaming it MidHudson Regional Hospital of Westchester Medical Center. The purchase added a total 243 beds which are made up of 40 psychiatric beds, 18 physical medicine and rehabilitation beds, 60 chemical dependence beds, and 125 medical beds (including pediatric and intensive care beds) to WMC's total. Mid-Hudson Regional is an ACS verified Level II Trauma Center and a Thrombectomy-capable stroke center.

=== Bon Secours Charity Health System ===
On May 20, 2015, WMC announced that it would become the majority corporate partner in the Bon Secours Charity Health System, taking on active management of its three hospitals in Rockland and Orange counties and ancillary services.

=== HealthAlliance of the Hudson Valley ===
On December 14, 2014, WMC and nonprofit HealthAlliance of the Hudson Valley announced it was in discussion for WMC to become the sole corporate member of HealthAlliance. This would result in WMC taking over management of HealthAlliance's two hospital campuses and ancillary healthcare services in Kingston, New York, along with HealthAlliance's Margaretville Hospital and Mountainside Residential Care Center nursing home in Margaretville, New York.

=== WMCHealth ===
Officials announced in 2015 the creation of the Westchester Medical Center Health Network, or WMCHealth. The network has 1,900 patient beds in 10 hospitals on 8 campuses, spanning 6,200 square miles in the lower and mid-Hudson Valley of New York. The network has nearly 3,000 attending physicians and employs over 12,000 staff.

=== New ambulatory pavilion ===
In 2017, WMC broke ground for a new ambulatory pavilion on its main campus in Valhalla, New York. The new building is attached to the main hospital. It includes 20,000 square feet of new, private inpatient rooms, 75,000 square feet of office space for affiliated private physician outpatient practices, and 185,000 square feet of ambulatory care services, including an advanced imaging center, an ambulatory surgery center, and a heart and vascular institute. At $230 million, it was the largest healthcare construction project in Westchester County since the hospital itself was built in 1977 and the Maria Fareri Children's Hospital was built in 2004.

== MRI patient death ==
In July 2001, 6-year-old Michael Colombini was undergoing a routine MRI scan when an oxygen tank (that was thought to be made of aluminum, but actually was made of steel) was improperly brought into the MRI room. The extremely large magnetic field of the MRI machine pulled the ferrous metal tank into the machine's core with great speed and force, killing the boy.

== See also ==
- Erie County Medical Center
- Nassau University Medical Center
- Roswell Park Comprehensive Cancer Center
