= Clarence Sumner Janifer =

African-American physician

Clarence Sumner Janifer Sr.
- Born: March 13, 1886; Virginia
- Died: November 14, 1950 (aged 64); Newark, New Jersey
- Education: Homeopathic Medical College of the State of New York (1915)
- Spouse: Una Marie
- Children: Clarence Janifer Jr.

Clarence Sumner Janifer Sr. (March 13, 1886 – November 14, 1950) was a physician and the first African American member of the Medical Society of New Jersey.

== Early life ==
Janifer was born on March 13, 1886, in Virginia. After his mother died, his father, George Sr. moved the family to Newark, New Jersey. George Sr. worked as a school janitor to support his two sons, George and Clarence. The small family were joined by the boys' uncle Joe and housekeeper and all lived in an upper unit of 190 Ridge Street, Newark.

In 1906, Clarence graduated with honors from Newark High School. Afterwards, he attended Syracuse University in New York. He graduated from the Homeopathic Medical College of the State of New York in 1915. Janifer passed the New Jersey board on his first attempt. Janifer returned to Newark and passed the city's clinic physician examination with a 99.09%.

== Military service ==
In 1917, Janifer volunteered for service in the army's Medical Reserve Corps. During World War I he was a medical officer, and was assigned to the Third Battalion, 372nd Infantry Regiment Medical Corps of the 93rd Division. It was one of the first American units to arrive in France following the declaration of war. General Pershing did not want to handle the African American troops and turned the unit over to the French, who had requested American reinforcements.

Janifer became an expert in leg amputations as many of the soldiers faced trench related injuries, such as trench foot.

On December 13, 1918, he was awarded the Croix de Guerre for providing first hand relief to wounded and courage under fire.

== Career ==
Before the war, Dr. Janifer practiced in Newark as a pediatrician. In 1916, he joined the National Medical Association, and he was the first African American member of the Medical Society of New Jersey.

Following the war, he worked for the Newark Health Department in various part-time positions. For much of his career, Janifer worked in an extremely poor, segregated slum known as, the "old Third Ward in the Hill District." After some time, he was put in charge of Newark's Well Baby Clinic for African Americans. In the mid-1920s, Janifer became a part of the surgical team at Philadelphia's Mercy Hospital.

Dr. Janifer published several articles in the Journal of the National Medical Association, based on his extensive clinical experience at the Well Baby Clinic. His intention was to educate African American mothers and care givers on the importance of child hygiene and nutrition. He hoped this would combat high mortality of African American children.

In 1946, he was asked to join the Newark City Hospital as a member of the pediatrics department. He was the second African American to be invited, the first being Dr. E. Mae McCarrol. In 1948, Dr. Janifer was one of the 42 distinguished citizens honored in the Hall of Fame of the New Jersey Herald Times. He went on to obtain two master's degrees in public health and practiced medicine in Newark for 35 years until his death.

== Personal life ==
Janifer was married to Una Marie, a former teacher at Tuskegee Institute. They had one son named Clarence Jr., born in the early 1920s. He became an oceanographer.

Clarence Sr. died of carcinoma of the prostate on November 14, 1950, in Newark, New Jersey. His wife, Una, survived him by 13 years and continued her life as an activist. Before her death in 1963, Una had been credited with the Brotherhood Award from the Newark Human Rights Commission and given a citation from the Council Against Intolerance in America.
