= New York County Medical Society =

- Founded: 1806
- Type: Physicians professional association
- Location: New York, U.S.
- Key people: Thomas Sterry, MD, President; Jessica Krant, MD, President-Elect; Richard Schutzer, MD, Vice President; Mark Milstein, MD, Secretary; Ksenija Belsley, MD Assistant Secretary; Jill R. Baron, MD, Treasurer; Stuart Gitlow, MD, Assistant Treasurer
- Website: www.nycms.org

The New York County Medical Society is a professional membership organization for physicians who live or work in the borough of Manhattan. As such, it is part of the larger network of medical organizations which includes the American Medical Association and the Medical Society of the State of New York.

According to its website, the mission of the NYCMS is

... to proactively identify and respond to the evolving needs of its members; to strive for the achievement of the highest standards of medical practice and quality of care by providing extended medical education and supporting advances in medical science; to champion the integrity of the patient-physician relationship; to improve public health through education initiatives and targeted community service efforts; and to serve as a strong advocate for both members and patients by working aggressively for enactment of supportive and enabling medical legislation.

The NYCMS was formed in 1806. It is operated and overseen by a board of directors and a board of trustees, and maintains several standing committees with specific areas of interest, including membership, medical credentialing, public health, and worker's compensation, and has an advisory committee for young practitioners.

== Notable members ==
- Mary E. Green
- Galen Hunter
- Daniel Levy Maduro Peixotto
- Isabella M. Pettet
