= American Academy of Psychoanalysis and Dynamic Psychiatry =

The American Academy of Psychodynamic Psychiatry and Psychoanalysis (AAPDPP) is a scholarly society including psychiatrists interested in all aspects of psychodynamic psychiatry.

== History ==
AAPDPP was founded in 1956 as the American Academy of Psychoanalysis. At that time, the American Psychoanalytic Association, which was the dominant psychoanalytic organization in North America, set standards for training psychoanalytic candidates at psychoanalytic institutes and certified individual psychoanalysts and institutes as well. The seventy-six charter members who founded the academy were concerned that focus on certification associated with a rigid Freudian framework inhibited discourse about basic psychoanalytic concepts. They wanted to establish a forum for open discussion and debate but not an organization that would certify psychoanalysts or psychoanalytic institutes.

Since the inception of the academy, great changes have taken place in the practice of psychoanalysis and in the application of depth psychology to psychiatric symptoms, syndromes and disorders. The academy became an Affiliate organization of the American Psychiatric Association in 1998. In 2001, the organization changed its name to The American Academy of Psychoanalysis and Dynamic Psychiatry. From originally being an organization of medical psychoanalysts, the academy became an organization of psychiatrists interested in all aspects of psychodynamic psychiatry. Psychoanalysis as a treatment technique remains one of its many interests. The membership of The academy consists of psychiatrists, psychiatric residents, and medical students. Researchers and scholars who are not psychiatrists are welcomed as Scientific Associates.

== Activities ==
All activities of the academy foster communication and discussion of psychodynamic concepts as expressed in clinical treatment, research, psychological development and diverse other ways as well. A major priority of The academy is to teach the principles of psychodynamic psychiatry to medical students, psychiatric residents and other mental health professionals and students. The specific activities include:

- Annual Meeting Of The Academy The meetings take place immediately prior to the annual meeting of The American Psychiatric Association (APA) and are usually organized around a central theme for example, the meeting in 2013 was focused on the suicidal patient. The meeting in 2016 was focused on play.
- Symposia and workshops at the American Psychiatric Association and the Institute on Psychiatric Services (IPS)
- Annual meeting in Italy co-sponsored with OPIFER (Organizzazione Psicoanalisti Italiania Federazione e Registro).
- Past meetings in Washington, DC, co-sponsored with the Consortium for Psychoanalytic Research.

== Publications and outreach activities ==
=== Psychodynamic Psychiatry, the Journal ===
Psychodynamic Psychiatry, the official journal of The American Academy of Psychoanalysis and Dynamic Psychiatry, published by Guilford Press, was created in response to the need for the continued study and teaching of psychodynamic concepts in organized psychiatry. Psychodynamic Psychiatry is the only English-language psychiatric journal exclusively devoted to the study and discussion of these issues.

The central tenet of the journal is that psychodynamic principles are necessary for adequately understanding and treating people with psychiatric symptoms, syndromes and disorders. Its guiding framework is developmental and bio-psycho-social.

The journal publishes review articles, clinical discussions and research. Psychodynamic Psychiatry is edited by Cesar A. Alfonso, M.D. and Jennifer I. Downey, M.D.. The Deputy Editor is Debra A. Katz, M.D.

From 1958 to 1972 the academy published its proceedings in monograph form under the rubric "Science and Psychoanalysis" edited by Jules Masserman. In 1973 Silvano Arieti became the first editor of the Journal which was entitled Journal of The American Academy of Psychoanalysis. Subsequent Editors- in Chief included Morton Cantor, Jules Bemporad and Douglas Ingram. When Richard C. Friedman became Editor in Chief in 2012, the journal's name was changed to Psychodynamic Psychiatry.

=== The Academy Forum ===
The Academy Forum is a magazine that is published twice yearly and focuses on psychoanalytic and psychodynamically oriented articles about art and culture.

=== The Academy Newsletter ===
The Academy Newsletter is published electronically four times a year and gives information about the organization and its members. Its Editor is Alicia McGill, MD.

=== Teichner Scholars Program ===
The late Victor J Teichner was a former president of the AAPDPP. A grateful patient established a fund making it possible to impart the spirit of Teichner's creative therapeutic perspective to psychiatric clinicians in training. The Victor J. Teichner Award is made annually to one psychiatric residency program on the basis of an application to the award committee, composed of representatives of the AAPDPP and the AADPRT (American Association of Directors of Psychiatric Residency Training). Its focus is to promote the teaching of psychodynamic principles to psychiatrists-in-training. The Program Awardee receives a one- to three-day visit from a visiting scholar chosen from a list maintained by the AAPDP. The choice of the visiting scholar and structure of the visit are made by the program. The visit must take place during the academic year beginning July 1, after the announcement of the awardee.
