= Touro University =

Touro University may refer to:

- Touro University, New York, the main university
- Touro University System or the schools within it:
  - Touro University California, a medical, pharmacy and physician assistant's school in Vallejo, California, US
  - Touro University Nevada, a medical, pharmacy and nursing school in Henderson, Nevada, US
  - Touro University Worldwide, the online branch of the Touro University System with offices in Los Alamitos, California, US
- Touro University College of Medicine, a proposed medical school disbanded in 2009
