= List of Jewish universities and colleges in the United States =

Jewish universities and colleges in the U.S. include:

- Academy for Jewish Religion, Yonkers, New York
- Albert Einstein College of Medicine, New York City
- American Jewish University, formerly University of Judaism and Brandeis-Bardin Institute (merged), Los Angeles, California.
- Gratz College, Melrose Park, Pennsylvania
- Florida Hebrew University, Aventura, Florida
- Hebrew College, Newton Centre, Massachusetts
- Hebrew Union College-Jewish Institute of Religion
  - Cincinnati, Ohio – closing in 2026
  - Los Angeles, California
  - New York City
  - The Debbie Friedman School of Sacred Music
- Jewish Theological Seminary of America, New York City
  - List College
- Spertus Institute for Jewish Learning and Leadership, Chicago
- Touro University System, New York City
  - Hebrew Theological College, Skokie, Illinois
  - Lander College for Men, Queens, New York
  - Lander College for Women, in Manhattan, New York
  - New York College of Podiatric Medicine New York Medical College, in Valhalla, New York
  - Touro College of Dental Medicine, in Hawthorne, New York
  - Touro College of Osteopathic Medicine
  - Touro Law Center, in Central Islip, New York
  - Touro University California, Vallejo, California
  - Touro University Nevada, Henderson, Nevada
- Yeshiva of Greater Washington (YGW) Kemp Mill, Maryland
- Yeshiva University, New York City
  - Benjamin N. Cardozo School of Law
  - Rabbi Isaac Elchanan Theological Seminary
  - Stern College for Women
  - Sy Syms School of Business
  - Yeshiva College

Closed

- Baltimore Hebrew University, now Baltimore Hebrew Institute, Towson University, Maryland
- Bramson ORT College, New York City
- Chicago ORT Technical Institute, Skokie, Illinois
- Maimonides College, Philadelphia

== See also ==
- Association of Advanced Rabbinical and Talmudic Schools
- List of Jewish fraternities and sororities
- Mothers Against College Antisemitism
