= List of research universities in the United States =

This is a list of universities in the United States classified among research universities in the Carnegie Classification of Institutions of Higher Education. This defines research institutions as those that spend more than $2.5 million on research and development, and assigns these institutions to one of three research designations based on total research expenditures and (for the higher two designations) production of research doctorates.

== History ==
The 1994 edition of the Carnegie Classification defined Research I universities as those that:

- Offer a full range of baccalaureate programs
- Are committed to graduate education through the doctorate
- Give high priority to research
- Award 50 or more doctoral degrees each year
- Receive annually $40 million or more in federal support

The Carnegie Foundation reported that 59 institutions met these criteria in 1994.

In their interim 2000 edition of the classification, the Carnegie Foundation renamed the category to Doctoral/research universities-extensive in order to avoid the inference that the categories signify quality differences." The foundation replaced their single classification system with a multiple classification system in their 2005 comprehensive overhaul of the classification framework so that the term "Research I university" was no longer valid, though many universities continued to use it.

In 2015, the Carnegie Classification System reinstated the "Research I university" designations along with "Research II" and "Research III." The system in use from 2018, included the following three categories for doctoral universities:

- R1: Doctoral Universities – Very high research activity
- R2: Doctoral Universities – High research activity
- D/PU: Doctoral/Professional Universities

In the 2018 classification, institutions were classified as either R1 or R2 if they "conferred at least 20 research/scholarship doctorates in 2016-17 and reported at least $5 million in total research expenditures." A "research activity index" was then calculated that included the following measures:

- Research & development (R&D) expenditures in science and engineering (S&E)
- R&D expenditures in non-S&E fields
- S&E research staff (postdoctoral appointees and other non-faculty research staff with doctorates)
- Doctoral conferrals in humanities, social science, STEM (science, technology, engineering, and mathematics) fields, and in other fields (e.g., business, education, public policy, social work)

These four measures were combined using principal component analysis to create two indices of research activity, one representing an aggregate level of research activity and the other representing per-capita research activity. Institutions that were high on both indices were classified among "R1: Doctoral Universities – Very high research activity."

In the 2025 classification, all institutions with more than $2.5 million in research expenditure were classified into three "Research Activity Designations":

- Research 1: Very High Research Spending and Doctorate Production (R1)
- Research 2: High Research Spending and Doctorate Production (R2)
- Research Colleges and Universities (RCU)

This revision also introduced a clear threshold for R1 classification, replacing the 10-metric score that had been used since 2005: (1) have $50 million in total annual research expenditures, and (2) grant 70 research doctorates per year. The threshold for R2 classification remained: (1) have $5 million in total annual research expenditures, and (2) grant 20 research doctorates per year. In both cases, the thresholds are taken as the higher of the most recent year or a three-year rolling average. Institutions that did not meet either the R1 or R2 thresholds but did have more than $2.5 million in research expenditure were classified as RCUs, without any requirement for awarding research doctorates. The titles for R1 and R2 were also changed, with the words "research activity" replaced by "research spending and doctorate production".

== Universities classified among "R1: Doctoral Universities – Very high research spending and doctorate production" ==
There are 187 institutions that are classified among "R1: Doctoral Universities – Very high research spending and doctorate production" in the Carnegie Classification of Institutions of Higher Education as of the 2025 update.

R1 universities spend at least $50 million a year on research and development and award at least 70 research doctorates.

Prior to the 2025 update, the R1 designation indicated that the university had a very high level of either aggregate research activity or per capita research activity (or both).

Doctoral Universities – Very high research spending and doctorate production
Name	City	State	Control
American University	Washington	DC	Private not-for-profit
Arizona State University	Tempe	AZ	Public
Auburn University	Auburn	AL	Public
Baylor College of Medicine	Houston	TX	Private not-for-profit
Baylor University	Waco	TX	Private not-for-profit
Binghamton University	Binghamton (Note: The campus has a Binghamton mailing address, but is mostly located in the adjacent town of Vestal.)	NY	Public
Boston College	Chestnut Hill	MA	Private not-for-profit
Boston University	Boston	MA	Private not-for-profit
Brandeis University	Waltham	MA	Private not-for-profit
Brigham Young University	Provo	UT	Private not-for-profit
Brown University	Providence	RI	Private not-for-profit
California Institute of Technology	Pasadena	CA	Private not-for-profit
Carnegie Mellon University	Pittsburgh	PA	Private not-for-profit
Case Western Reserve University	Cleveland	OH	Private not-for-profit
Catholic University of America	Washington	DC	Private not-for-profit
Clemson University	Clemson	SC	Public
Colorado School of Mines	Golden	CO	Public
Colorado State University-Fort Collins	Fort Collins	CO	Public
Columbia University in the City of New York	New York (Note: "New York" is the U.S. Postal Service designation for the New York City borough of Manhattan.)	NY	Private not-for-profit
Cornell University	Ithaca	NY	Private not-for-profit
CUNY Graduate School and University Center	New York	NY	Public
Dartmouth College	Hanover	NH	Private not-for-profit
Drexel University	Philadelphia	PA	Private not-for-profit
Duke University	Durham	NC	Private not-for-profit
East Carolina University	Greenville	NC	Public
Emory University	Atlanta	GA	Private not-for-profit
Florida Atlantic University	Boca Raton	FL	Public
Florida International University	Miami (Note: The campus has a Miami mailing address, but is in the unincorporated Miami-Dade County community of Westchester.)	FL	Public
Florida State University	Tallahassee	FL	Public
George Mason University	Fairfax (Note: The main campus has a Fairfax mailing address, but is in unincorporated Fairfax County.)	VA	Public
George Washington University	Washington	DC	Private not-for-profit
Georgetown University	Washington	DC	Private not-for-profit
Georgia Institute of Technology-Main Campus	Atlanta	GA	Public
Georgia State University	Atlanta	GA	Public
Harvard University	Cambridge	MA	Private not-for-profit
Howard University	Washington	DC	Private not-for-profit
Indiana University Bloomington	Bloomington	IN	Public
Indiana University Indianapolis	Indianapolis	IN	Public
Iowa State University	Ames	IA	Public
Johns Hopkins University	Baltimore	MD	Private not-for-profit
Kansas State University	Manhattan	KS	Public
Kent State University at Kent	Kent	OH	Public
Lehigh University	Bethlehem	PA	Private not-for-profit
Louisiana State University and Agricultural & Mechanical College	Baton Rouge	LA	Public
Loyola University Chicago	Chicago	IL	Private not-for-profit
Massachusetts Institute of Technology	Cambridge	MA	Private not-for-profit
Medical University of South Carolina	Charleston	SC	Public
Michigan State University	East Lansing	MI	Public
Michigan Technological University	Houghton	MI	Public
Mississippi State University	Mississippi State	MS	Public
Missouri University of Science and Technology	Rolla	MO	Public
Montana State University	Bozeman	MT	Public
New Jersey Institute of Technology	Newark	NJ	Public
New Mexico State University-Main Campus	Las Cruces	NM	Public
New York University	New York	NY	Private not-for-profit
North Carolina State University at Raleigh	Raleigh	NC	Public
North Dakota State University-Main Campus	Fargo	ND	Public
Northeastern University	Boston	MA	Private not-for-profit
Northern Arizona University	Flagstaff	AZ	Public
Northwestern University	Evanston	IL	Private not-for-profit
Nova Southeastern University	Fort Lauderdale	FL	Private not-for-profit
Ohio State University-Main Campus	Columbus	OH	Public
Ohio University-Main Campus	Athens	OH	Public
Oklahoma State University	Stillwater	OK	Public
Old Dominion University	Norfolk	VA	Public
Oregon State University	Corvallis	OR	Public
Princeton University	Princeton	NJ	Private not-for-profit
Purdue University	West Lafayette	IN	Public
Rensselaer Polytechnic Institute	Troy	NY	Private not-for-profit
Rice University	Houston	TX	Private not-for-profit
Rutgers University-New Brunswick	New Brunswick (Note: The university is split into five sub-campuses; the historic core campus and academic administration are in New Brunswick. Large portions of the university, including the athletic department, are in Piscataway with a mailing address in that community. Portions of the sub-campuses spill over into several adjacent communites.)	NJ	Public
Saint Louis University	St. Louis	MO	Private not-for-profit
San Diego State University	San Diego	CA	Public
Southern Illinois University-Carbondale	Carbondale	IL	Public
Southern Methodist University	Dallas (Note: The campus has a Dallas mailing address, but is almost entirely located in the separate city of University Park.)	TX	Private not-for-profit
Stanford University	Stanford	CA	Private not-for-profit
Stony Brook University	Stony Brook	NY	Public
Syracuse University	Syracuse	NY	Private not-for-profit
Temple University	Philadelphia	PA	Public (Note: Receives state funding as part of the Commonwealth System of Higher Education, but is privately governed.)
Texas A & M University-College Station	College Station	TX	Public
Texas Tech University	Lubbock	TX	Public
The Pennsylvania State University	University Park (Note: "University Park" is the postal designation for the main Penn State campus, which is divided between the communities of State College, Ferguson Township, and College Township.)	PA	Public
The University of Alabama	Tuscaloosa	AL	Public
The University of Montana	Missoula	MT	Public
The University of Tennessee Health Science Center	Memphis	TN	Public
The University of Tennessee-Knoxville	Knoxville	TN	Public
The University of Texas at Arlington	Arlington	TX	Public
The University of Texas at Austin	Austin	TX	Public
The University of Texas at Dallas	Richardson	TX	Public
The University of Texas at El Paso	El Paso	TX	Public
The University of Texas at San Antonio	San Antonio	TX	Public
The University of Texas Health Science Center at Houston	Houston	TX	Public
The University of Texas Health Science Center at San Antonio	San Antonio	TX	Public
The University of Texas Southwestern Medical Center	Dallas	TX	Public
Tufts University	Medford	MA	Private not-for-profit
Tulane University of Louisiana	New Orleans	LA	Private not-for-profit
University at Albany	Albany	NY	Public
University at Buffalo	Buffalo (Note: The campus has a Buffalo mailing address, but is mostly located in the adjacent town of Amherst.)	NY	Public
University of Alabama at Birmingham	Birmingham	AL	Public
University of Arizona	Tucson	AZ	Public
University of Arkansas	Fayetteville	AR	Public
University of California, Berkeley	Berkeley	CA	Public
University of California, Davis	Davis	CA	Public
University of California, Irvine	Irvine	CA	Public
University of California, Los Angeles	Los Angeles	CA	Public
University of California, Merced	Merced	CA	Public
University of California, Riverside	Riverside	CA	Public
University of California, San Diego	La Jolla (Note: La Jolla is a San Diego neighborhood served by a separate post office from most of the city.)	CA	Public
University of California, San Francisco	San Francisco	CA	Public
University of California, Santa Barbara	Santa Barbara (Note: The campus has a Santa Barbara mailing address, but is mostly located in the adjacent community of Isla Vista.)	CA	Public
University of California, Santa Cruz	Santa Cruz	CA	Public
University of Central Florida	Orlando (Note: The main campus has an Orlando mailing address, but is located in unincorporated Orange County.)	FL	Public
University of Chicago	Chicago	IL	Private not-for-profit
University of Cincinnati	Cincinnati	OH	Public
University of Colorado Boulder	Boulder	CO	Public
University of Colorado Denver/Anschutz Medical Campus	Denver	CO	Public
University of Connecticut	Storrs	CT	Public
University of Dayton	Dayton	OH	Private not-for-profit
University of Delaware	Newark	DE	Public (Note: Defined in state law as a "privately governed, state-assisted" institution.)
University of Denver	Denver	CO	Private not-for-profit
University of Florida	Gainesville	FL	Public
University of Georgia	Athens	GA	Public
University of Hawaii at Manoa	Honolulu	HI	Public
University of Houston	Houston	TX	Public
University of Idaho	Moscow	ID	Public
University of Illinois Chicago	Chicago	IL	Public
University of Illinois Urbana-Champaign	Champaign (Note: The campus is almost evenly divided between Champaign and Urbana. The main administration building for the campus is in Champaign.)	IL	Public
University of Iowa	Iowa City	IA	Public
University of Kansas	Lawrence	KS	Public
University of Kentucky	Lexington	KY	Public
University of Louisiana at Lafayette	Lafayette	LA	Public
University of Louisville	Louisville	KY	Public
University of Maine	Orono	ME	Public
University of Maryland-Baltimore County	Catonsville	MD	Public
University of Maryland-College Park	College Park	MD	Public
University of Maryland, Baltimore	Baltimore	MD	Public
University of Massachusetts-Amherst	Amherst	MA	Public
University of Massachusetts-Boston	Boston	MA	Public
University of Massachusetts-Lowell	Lowell	MA	Public
University of Memphis	Memphis	TN	Public
University of Miami	Coral Gables	FL	Private not-for-profit
University of Michigan-Ann Arbor	Ann Arbor	MI	Public
University of Minnesota-Twin Cities	Minneapolis (Note: The campus is divided between the cities of Minneapolis and Falcon Heights. The campus administration is in Minneapolis.)	MN	Public
University of Mississippi	University	MS	Public
University of Missouri-Columbia	Columbia	MO	Public
University of Missouri-Kansas City	Kansas City	MO	Public
University of Nebraska Medical Center	Omaha	NE	Public
University of Nebraska-Lincoln	Lincoln	NE	Public
University of Nevada-Las Vegas	Las Vegas (Note: The campus has a Las Vegas mailing address, but is located outside the city limits in the unincorporated community of Paradise.)	NV	Public
University of Nevada-Reno	Reno	NV	Public
University of New Hampshire-Main Campus	Durham	NH	Public
University of New Mexico-Main Campus	Albuquerque	NM	Public
University of North Carolina at Chapel Hill	Chapel Hill	NC	Public
University of North Carolina at Charlotte	Charlotte	NC	Public
University of North Dakota	Grand Forks	ND	Public
University of North Texas	Denton	TX	Public
University of Notre Dame	Notre Dame	IN	Private not-for-profit
University of Oklahoma-Norman Campus	Norman	OK	Public
University of Oregon	Eugene	OR	Public
University of Pennsylvania	Philadelphia	PA	Private not-for-profit
University of Pittsburgh-Pittsburgh Campus	Pittsburgh	PA	Public
University of Rhode Island	Kingston	RI	Public
University of Rochester	Rochester	NY	Private not-for-profit
University of South Carolina-Columbia	Columbia	SC	Public
University of South Florida	Tampa	FL	Public
University of Southern California	Los Angeles	CA	Private not-for-profit
University of Southern Mississippi	Hattiesburg	MS	Public
University of Toledo	Toledo	OH	Public
University of Utah	Salt Lake City	UT	Public
University of Vermont	Burlington	VT	Public
University of Virginia-Main Campus	Charlottesville	VA	Public
University of Washington-Seattle Campus	Seattle	WA	Public
University of Wisconsin-Madison	Madison	WI	Public
University of Wisconsin-Milwaukee	Milwaukee	WI	Public
University of Wyoming	Laramie	WY	Public
Utah State University	Logan	UT	Public
Vanderbilt University	Nashville	TN	Private not-for-profit
Virginia Commonwealth University	Richmond	VA	Public
Virginia Polytechnic Institute and State University	Blacksburg	VA	Public
Washington State University	Pullman	WA	Public
Washington University in St Louis	St. Louis	MO	Private not-for-profit
Wayne State University	Detroit	MI	Public
Weill Cornell Medicine	New York	NY	Private not-for-profit
West Virginia University	Morgantown	WV	Public
William & Mary	Williamsburg	VA	Public
Worcester Polytechnic Institute	Worcester	MA	Private not-for-profit
Yale University	New Haven	CT	Private not-for-profit

=== Map of R1 institutions ===
A map of all R1 research universities in the United States. Blue dots represent public institutions whereas red dots represent private institutions.

== Universities classified among "R2: Doctoral Universities – High research spending and doctorate production" ==
There are 140 institutions that are classified among "R2: Doctoral Universities – High research spending and doctorate production" in the Carnegie Classification of Institutions of Higher Education as of the 2025 update.

The R2 designation indicates that, on average, the university spends at least $5 million a year on research and development and awards at least 20 research doctorates.

Prior to the 2025 update, the R2 designation was assigned to universities with a high level of aggregate research activity or per capita research activity (or both), but not a very high level in either.

Doctoral Universities – High research activity
Institution	Control	City	State
Abilene Christian University	Private (non-profit)	Abilene	TX
Air Force Institute of Technology Graduate School of Engineering & Management	Public	Wright-Patterson AFB	OH
Albert Einstein College of Medicine	Private (non-profit)	Bronx	NY
Appalachian State University	Public	Boone	NC
Arkansas State University	Public	Jonesboro	AR
Augusta University	Public	Augusta	GA
Azusa Pacific University	Private (non-profit)	Azusa	CA
Ball State University	Public	Muncie	IN
Boise State University	Public	Boise	ID
Bowling Green State University	Public	Bowling Green	OH
California State Polytechnic University, Pomona	Public	Pomona	CA
California State University, Fresno	Public	Fresno	CA
California State University, Fullerton	Public	Fullerton	CA
California State University, Long Beach	Public	Long Beach	CA
California State University, Los Angeles	Public	Los Angeles	CA
California State University, Sacramento	Public	Sacramento	CA
Central Michigan University	Public	Mount Pleasant	MI
Chapman University	Private (non-profit)	Orange	CA
Claremont Graduate University	Private (non-profit)	Claremont	CA
Clark Atlanta University	Private (non-profit)	Atlanta	GA
Clark University	Private (non-profit)	Worcester	MA
Clarkson University	Private (non-profit)	Potsdam	NY
Cleveland State University	Public	Cleveland	OH
Creighton University	Private (non-profit)	Omaha	NE
CUNY City College	Public	New York (Note: "New York" is the U.S. Postal Service designation for the New York City borough of Manhattan.)	NY
CUNY Hunter College	Public	New York	NY
Delaware State University	Public (Note: Defined in state law as a "privately governed, state-assisted" institution.)	Dover	DE
DePaul University	Private (non-profit)	Chicago	IL
Duquesne University	Private (non-profit)	Pittsburgh	PA
East Tennessee State University	Public	Johnson City	TN
East Texas A&M University	Public	Commerce	TX
Eastern Michigan University	Public	Ypsilanti	MI
Eastern Virginia Medical School (EVMS ceased being a separate institution on July 1, 2024. It is now part of Old Dominion University.)	Public	Norfolk	VA
Embry-Riddle Aeronautical University-Daytona Beach	Private (non-profit)	Daytona Beach	FL
Florida Agricultural and Mechanical University	Public	Tallahassee	FL
Florida Institute of Technology	Private (non-profit)	Melbourne	FL
Fordham University	Private (non-profit)	Bronx	NY
Georgia Southern University	Public	Statesboro	GA
Hampton University	Private (non-profit)	Hampton	VA
Hofstra University	Private (non-profit)	Hempstead	NY
Icahn School of Medicine at Mount Sinai	Private (non-profit)	New York	NY
Idaho State University	Public	Pocatello	ID
Illinois Institute of Technology	Private (non-profit)	Chicago	IL
Illinois State University	Public	Normal	IL
Indiana University of Pennsylvania	Public	Indiana	PA
Jackson State University	Public	Jackson	MS
James Madison University	Public	Harrisonburg	VA
Kean University	Public	Union	NJ
Kennesaw State University	Public	Kennesaw (Note: The campus has a Kennesaw mailing address but is located in unincorporated Cobb County.)	GA
Lamar University	Public	Beaumont	TX
Loma Linda University	Private (non-profit)	Loma Linda	CA
Long Island University	Private (non-profit)	Brookville (Note: LIU has two main campuses—one in Brookville and the other in Brooklyn.)	NY
Louisiana State University Health Sciences Center, New Orleans	Public	New Orleans	LA
Louisiana State University New Orleans	Public	New Orleans	LA
Louisiana Tech University	Public	Ruston	LA
Loyola Marymount University	Private (non-profit)	Los Angeles	CA
Marquette University	Private (non-profit)	Milwaukee	WI
Marshall University	Public	Huntington	WV
Medical College of Wisconsin	Private (non-profit)	Milwaukee	WI
Mercer University	Private (non-profit)	Macon	GA
Miami University, Oxford	Public	Oxford	OH
Middle Tennessee State University	Public	Murfreesboro	TN
Montclair State University	Public	Montclair	NJ
Morgan State University	Public	Baltimore	MD
North Carolina A&T State University	Public	Greensboro	NC
Northern Illinois University	Public	DeKalb	IL
Oakland University	Public	Rochester (Note: The main Oakland campus has a Rochester mailing address, but is divided between the separate cities of Auburn Hills and Rochester Hills.)	MI
Oklahoma State University Center for Health Sciences	Public	Tulsa	OK
Oregon Health & Science University	Public	Portland	OR
Pepperdine University	Private (non-profit)	Malibu (Note: The campus has a Malibu mailing address but is located in unincorporated Los Angeles County.)	CA
Portland State University	Public	Portland	OR
Prairie View A&M University	Public	Prairie View	TX
Rochester Institute of Technology	Private (non-profit)	Rochester (Note: RIT has a Rochester mailing address, but is located in the nearby town of Henrietta.)	NY
Rockefeller University	Private (non-profit)	New York	NY
Rowan University	Public	Glassboro	NJ
Rush University	Private (non-profit)	Chicago	IL
Rutgers University–Camden	Public	Camden	NJ
Rutgers University–Newark	Public	Newark	NJ
Saint Joseph's University	Private (non-profit)	Philadelphia	PA
Sam Houston State University	Public	Huntsville	TX
San Francisco State University	Public	San Francisco	CA
San Jose State University	Public	San Jose	CA
Seton Hall University	Private (non-profit)	South Orange	NJ
South Carolina State University	Public	Orangeburg	SC
South Dakota State University	Public	Brookings	SD
Southern Connecticut State University	Public	New Haven	CT
Southern University	Public	Baton Rouge	LA
Stevens Institute of Technology	Private (non-profit)	Hoboken	NJ
SUNY College of Environmental Science and Forestry	Public	Syracuse	NY
Tarleton State University	Public	Stephenville	TX
Teachers College, Columbia University	Private (non-profit)	New York	NY
Tennessee State University	Public	Nashville	TN
Tennessee Technological University	Public	Cookeville	TN
Texas A&M University–Corpus Christi	Public	Corpus Christi	TX
Texas A&M University–Kingsville	Public	Kingsville	TX
Texas Christian University	Private (non-profit)	Fort Worth	TX
Texas Southern University	Public	Houston	TX
Texas State University	Public	San Marcos	TX
Texas Tech University Health Sciences Center	Public	Lubbock	TX
Texas Woman's University	Public	Denton	TX
The New School	Private (non-profit)	New York	NY
The University of Texas at Tyler	Public	Tyler	TX
The University of Texas Medical Branch at Galveston	Public	Galveston	TX
The University of Texas Rio Grande Valley	Public	Edinburg (Note: UTRGV has multiple campuses within its service area of the Lower Rio Grande Valley; its administration is located at the Edinburg campus it inherited from one of its predecessor institutions, the University of Texas–Pan American.)	TX
The University of West Florida	Public	Pensacola	FL
Thomas Jefferson University	Private (non-profit)	Philadelphia	PA
University of Akron Main Campus	Public	Akron	OH
University of Alabama, Huntsville	Public	Huntsville	AL
University of Alaska Fairbanks	Public	Fairbanks	AK
University of Arkansas at Little Rock	Public	Little Rock	AR
University of Arkansas for Medical Sciences	Public	Little Rock	AR
University of Colorado Colorado Springs	Public	Colorado Springs	CO
University of Massachusetts Chan Medical School	Public	Worcester	MA
University of Massachusetts Dartmouth	Public	North Dartmouth	MA
University of Michigan-Dearborn	Public	Dearborn	MI
University of Missouri–St. Louis	Public	St. Louis	MO
University of Nebraska Omaha	Public	Omaha	NE
University of New England	Private (non-profit)	Biddeford	ME
University of North Carolina at Greensboro	Public	Greensboro	NC
University of North Carolina Wilmington	Public	Wilmington	NC
University of North Florida	Public	Jacksonville	FL
University of Northern Colorado	Public	Greeley	CO
University of Oklahoma-Health Sciences Center	Public	Oklahoma City	OK
University of Puerto Rico, Mayaguez	Public	Mayaguez	PR
University of Puerto Rico, Rio Piedras	Public	San Juan	PR
University of San Diego	Private (non-profit)	San Diego	CA
University of San Francisco	Private (non-profit)	San Francisco	CA
University of South Alabama	Public	Mobile	AL
University of South Dakota	Public	Vermillion	SD
University of Tulsa	Private (non-profit)	Tulsa	OK
Upstate Medical University	Public	Syracuse	NY
Villanova University	Private (non-profit)	Villanova	PA
Virginia State University	Public	Petersburg	VA
Wake Forest University	Private (non-profit)	Winston-Salem	NC
West Chester University of Pennsylvania	Public	West Chester	PA
Western Michigan University	Public	Kalamazoo	MI
Wichita State University	Public	Wichita	KS
Wright State University	Public	Dayton (Note: Wright State has a Dayton mailing address but is located in the separate city of Fairborn.)	OH
Yeshiva University	Private (non-profit)	New York	NY

=== Map of R2 institutions ===
A map of all R2 research universities in the United States and Territories. Blue dots represent public institutions whereas red dots represent private institutions.

== Institutions classified among "Research Colleges and Universities" ==
As of the 2025 update, the Carnegie Foundation classifies 216 institutions as "Research Colleges and Universities". This new category requires institutions spend at least $2.5 million on research & development and are not included in the R1 or R2 categories.

Research Colleges and Universities
Institution	Control	City	State
Alabama A&M University	Public	Huntsville	AL
Alabama State University	Public	Montgomery	AL
University of Alaska Anchorage	Public	Anchorage	AK
Albany College of Pharmacy and Health Sciences	Private non-profit	Albany	NY
Albany Medical College	Private non-profit	Albany	NY
Alcorn State University	Public	Alcorn State (Note: The campus has a Lorman mailing address.)	MS
Alfred University	Private non-profit	Alfred	NY
Amherst College	Private non-profit	Amherst	MA
University of Arkansas at Pine Bluff	Public	Pine Bluff	AR
Austin Peay State University	Public	Clarksville	TN
University of Baltimore	Public	Baltimore	MD
Barnard College	Private non-profit	New York (Note: "New York" is the U.S. Postal Service designation for the New York City borough of Manhattan.)	NY
CUNY Bernard M. Baruch College	Public	New York	NY
Biola University	Private non-profit	La Mirada	CA
Bowdoin College	Private non-profit	Brunswick	ME
Bowie State University	Public	Bowie (Note: The campus has a Bowie mailing address, but is in unincorporated Prince George's County.)	MD
CUNY Brooklyn College	Public	Brooklyn	NY
Bryn Mawr College	Private non-profit	Bryn Mawr	PA
Bucknell University	Private non-profit	Lewisburg	PA
SUNY Buffalo State University (Buffalo State)	Public	Buffalo	NY
California State Polytechnic University, Humboldt (Cal Poly Humboldt)	Public	Arcata	CA
California Polytechnic State University, San Luis Obispo (Cal Poly San Luis Obispo)	Public	San Luis Obispo	CA
California State University, Bakersfield	Public	Bakersfield	CA
California State University, Channel Islands	Public	Camarillo (Note: The campus has a Camarillo mailing address, but is in unincorporated Ventura County.)	CA
California State University, Chico	Public	Chico	CA
California State University, Dominguez Hills	Public	Carson	CA
California State University, East Bay	Public	Hayward	CA
California State University, Monterey Bay	Public	Seaside (Note: The campus has a Seaside mailing address, but is divided between the cities of Seaside and Marina.)	CA
California State University, Northridge	Public	Northridge (Note: Northridge is one of many Los Angeles neighborhoods that have separate post offices from the bulk of the city.)	CA
California State University, San Bernardino	Public	San Bernardino	CA
California State University, San Marcos	Public	San Marcos	CA
Calvin University	Private non-profit	Grand Rapids	MI
Carleton College	Private non-profit	Northfield	MN
University of Central Arkansas	Public	Conway	AR
Universidad Central del Caribe	Private non-profit	Bayamón	PR
University of Central Oklahoma	Public	Edmond	OK
Central State University	Public	Wilberforce	OH
Central Washington University	Public	Ellensburg	WA
Charles R. Drew University of Medicine and Science	Private non-profit	Los Angeles (Note: The campus has a Los Angeles mailing address, but is in the unincorporated Los Angeles County community of Willowbrook.)	CA
Chicago State University	Public	Chicago	IL
Christopher Newport University	Public	Newport News	VA
The Citadel, The Military College of South Carolina	Public	Charleston	SC
CUNY New York City College of Technology (City Tech)	Public	Bronx	NY
Claremont McKenna College	Private non-profit	Claremont	CA
Coastal Carolina University	Public	Conway	SC
Colby College	Private non-profit	Waterville	ME
Colgate University	Private non-profit	Hamilton	NY
College of Charleston	Public	Charleston	SC
Colorado College	Private non-profit	Colorado Springs	CO
Colorado State University Pueblo	Public	Pueblo	CO
Dakota State University	Public	Madison	SD
Davidson College	Private non-profit	Davidson	NC
Des Moines University – Osteopathic Medical Center	Private non-profit	West Des Moines	IA
University of Detroit Mercy	Private non-profit	Detroit	MI
Diné College	Public, tribal	Tsaile	AZ
University of the District of Columbia	Public	Washington	DC
East Stroudsburg University of Pennsylvania	Public	East Stroudsburg	PA
Eastern Washington University	Public	Cheney	WA
Edward Via College of Osteopathic Medicine	Private non-profit	Blacksburg	VA
Elon University	Private non-profit	Elon	NC
Fayetteville State University	Public	Fayetteville	NC
Fisk University	Private non-profit	Nashville	TN
Florida Gulf Coast University	Public	Fort Myers (Note: The campus has a Fort Myers mailing address, but is in unincorporated Lee County.)	FL
Fort Lewis College	Public	Durango	CO
Fort Valley State University	Public	Fort Valley	GA
Franklin & Marshall College	Private non-profit	Lancaster	PA
Gallaudet University	Private non-profit (Note: Federally chartered to serve the deaf and hearing-impaired community.)	Washington	DC
Grand Valley State University	Public	Allendale	MI
Grinnell College	Private non-profit	Grinnell	IA
University of Guam	Public	Mangilao	GU
Hamilton College	Private non-profit	Clinton	NY
Harvey Mudd College	Private non-profit	Claremont	CA
Haverford College	Private non-profit	Haverford	PA
University of Hawaiʻi at Hilo	Public	Hilo	HI
Hawaiʻi Pacific University	Private non-profit	Honolulu	HI
High Tech High Graduate School of Education	Public (Note: This institution is part of an organization that operates charter schools. It receives public funding but is separate from other public entities.)	San Diego	CA
Hobart and William Smith Colleges	Private non-profit	Geneva	NY
Hope College	Private non-profit	Holland	MI
University of Illinois Springfield (Illinois Springfield or UIS)	Public	Springfield	IL
CUNY John Jay College of Criminal Justice	Public	New York	NY
Keck Graduate Institute	Private non-profit	Claremont	CA
Kentucky State University	Public	Frankfort	KY
Lake Superior State University	Public	Sault Ste. Marie	MI
Langston University	Public	Langston	OK
Lawrence Technological University	Private non-profit	Southfield	MI
CUNY Lehman College	Public	Bronx	NY
Lewis & Clark College	Private non-profit	Portland	OR
Lincoln University	Public	Jefferson City	MO
University of Louisiana at Monroe (Louisiana–Monroe or ULM)	Public	Monroe	LA
Louisiana State University Health Sciences Center Shreveport	Public	Shreveport	LA
Marian University	Private non-profit	Indianapolis	IN
University of Maryland Eastern Shore (Maryland Eastern Shore or UMES)	Public	Princess Anne (Note: The campus has a Princess Anne mailing address, but is in unincorporated Somerset County.)	MD
Marymount University	Private non-profit	Arlington	VA
Mass General Brigham University of Health Professions	Private non-profit	Boston	MA
The University of Texas MD Anderson Cancer Center (MD Anderson)	Public	Houston	TX
Meharry Medical College	Private non-profit	Nashville	TN
Middlebury College	Private non-profit	Middlebury	VT
Midwestern University–Downers Grove	Private non-profit	Downers Grove	IL
Midwestern University–Glendale	Private non-profit	Glendale	AZ
Milwaukee School of Engineering	Private non-profit	Milwaukee	WI
University of Minnesota Duluth	Public	Duluth	MN
Minnesota State University, Mankato	Public	Mankato	MN
Missouri State University–Springfield	Public	Springfield	MO
Monmouth University	Private non-profit	West Long Branch	NJ
Montana Technological University	Public	Butte	MT
Morehead State University	Public	Morehead	KY
Morehouse College	Private non-profit	Atlanta	GA
Morehouse School of Medicine	Private non-profit	Atlanta	GA
Mount Holyoke College	Private non-profit	South Hadley	MA
Murray State University	Public	Murray	KY
Naval Postgraduate School	Public	Monterey	CA
University of Nebraska at Kearney	Public	Kearney	NE
University of New Haven	Private non-profit	West Haven	CT
New Mexico Highlands University	Public	Las Vegas	NM
New Mexico Institute of Mining and Technology	Public	Socorro	NM
New York Institute of Technology	Private non-profit	Old Westbury	NY
New York Medical College	Private non-profit	Valhalla	NY
Norfolk State University	Public	Norfolk	VA
North Carolina Central University	Public	Durham	NC
Northeast Ohio Medical University	Public	Rootstown	OH
University of Northern Iowa	Public	Cedar Falls	IA
Northern Kentucky University	Public	Highland Heights	KY
Northwest Indian College	Public, tribal	Bellingham	WA
Occidental College	Private non-profit	Los Angeles	CA
Oregon Institute of Technology	Public	Klamath Falls	OR
Pace University	Private non-profit	New York	NY
Pacific University	Private non-profit	Forest Grove	OR
Pennsylvania State University – Penn State Erie–Behrend College (Penn State Behrend)	Public (Note: This school receives state funding as part of the Commonwealth System of Higher Education but is privately governed.)	Erie	PA
Pennsylvania State University – Penn State Harrisburg (Penn State Harrisburg)	Public	Harrisburg	PA
Philadelphia College of Osteopathic Medicine	Private non-profit	Philadelphia	PA
Pittsburg State University	Public	Pittsburg	KS
Pomona College	Private non-profit	Claremont	CA
Ponce Health Sciences University	Private non-profit	Ponce	PR
Providence College	Private non-profit	Providence	RI
Purdue University Fort Wayne	Public	Fort Wayne	IN
Purdue University Northwest	Public	Hammond	IN
CUNY Queens College	Public	Queens	NY
Reed College	Private non-profit	Portland	OR
Rhode Island College	Private non-profit	Providence	RI
Rhode Island School of Design	Private non-profit	Providence	RI
University of Richmond	Private non-profit	Richmond	VA
Roger Williams University	Private non-profit	Bristol	RI
Rosalind Franklin University of Medicine and Science	Private non-profit	North Chicago	IL
Roseman University of Health Sciences	Private non-profit	Henderson	NV
Sacred Heart University	Private non-profit	Fairfield	CT
Saginaw Valley State University	Public	University Center	MI
St. Cloud State University	Public	St. Cloud	MN
St. Edward's University	Private non-profit	Austin	TX
St. John's University–New York	Private non-profit	Queens	NY
University of St. Thomas	Private non-profit	Saint Paul	MN
Salisbury University	Public	Salisbury	MD
Santa Clara University	Private non-profit	Santa Clara	CA
Seattle University	Private non-profit	Seattle	WA
Smith College	Private non-profit	Northampton	MA
Sonoma State University	Public	Rohnert Park	CA
South Dakota School of Mines and Technology	Public	Rapid City	SD
Southeastern Louisiana University	Public	Hammond	LA
Southern Illinois University Edwardsville	Public	Edwardsville	IL
University of Southern Maine	Public	Portland	ME
Spelman College	Private non-profit	Atlanta	GA
College of Staten Island, CUNY	Public	Staten Island	NY
Stephen F. Austin State University	Public	Nacogdoches	TX
Suffolk University	Private non-profit	Boston	MA
Sul Ross State University	Public	Alpine	TX
SUNY College of Agriculture and Technology at Cobleskill (SUNY Cobleskill)	Public	Cobleskill	NY
SUNY Downstate Health Sciences University (SUNY Downstate)	Public	Brooklyn	NY
SUNY College of Optometry (SUNY Optometry)	Public	New York	NY
SUNY Polytechnic Institute (SUNY Poly)	Public	Utica (Note: The campus has a Utica mailing address but is in the adjacent town of Marcy.)	NY
Swarthmore College	Private non-profit	Swarthmore	PA
The College of New Jersey (TCNJ)	Public	Ewing	NJ
Texas A&M International University	Public	Laredo	TX
Texas Tech University Health Sciences Center El Paso	Public	El Paso	TX
Tougaloo College	Private non-profit	Jackson	MS
Touro University	Private non-profit	New York	NY
Touro University California	Private non-profit	Vallejo	CA
Towson University	Public	Towson	MD
Toyota Technological Institute at Chicago	Private non-profit	Chicago	IL
Trinity College	Private non-profit	Hartford	CT
Trinity University	Private non-profit	San Antonio	TX
Troy University	Public	Troy	AL
Tuskegee University	Private non-profit	Tuskegee	AL
University of Health Sciences and Pharmacy in St. Louis (Note: UHSP will be merged into Washington University in St. Louis after the 2026–27 academic year as the WUSTL pharmacy college.) (UHSP)	Private non-profit	St. Louis	MO
University of North Carolina at Asheville (UNC Asheville)	Public	Asheville	NC
United States Air Force Academy	Public	USAF Academy	CO
United States Military Academy	Public	West Point	NY
United States Naval Academy	Public	Annapolis	MD
University of North Texas Health Science Center (UNT Health)	Public	Fort Worth	TX
University of Puerto Rico–Medical Sciences (UPR–RCM)	Public	San Juan	PR
University of South Carolina Upstate (USC Upstate)	Public	Spartanburg	SC
The University of Tennessee at Chattanooga (UT Chattanooga or Chattanooga)	Public	Chattanooga	TN
The University of Texas Permian Basin (UT Permian Basin or UTPB)	Public	Odessa	TX
Vassar College	Private non-profit	Poughkeepsie	NY
University of the Virgin Islands	Public	Charlotte Amalie	VI
University of Washington–Bothell Campus	Public	Bothell	WA
University of Washington–Tacoma Campus	Public	Tacoma	WA
Wellesley College	Private non-profit	Wellesley	MA
Wesleyan University	Private non-profit	Middletown	CT
West Texas A&M University	Public	Canyon	TX
West Virginia State University	Public	Institute	WV
Western Carolina University	Public	Cullowhee	NC
Western Illinois University	Public	Macomb	IL
Western Kentucky University	Public	Bowling Green	KY
Western Michigan University Homer Stryker M.D. School of Medicine	Private non-profit (Note: The medical school is separate from, though affiliated with, the public Western Michigan University.)	Kalamazoo	MI
Western University of Health Sciences	Private non-profit	Pomona	CA
Western Washington University	Public	Bellingham	WA
William Paterson University of New Jersey	Public	Wayne	NJ
Williams College	Private non-profit	Williamstown	MA
Winston-Salem State University	Public	Winston-Salem	NC
Winthrop University	Public	Rock Hill	SC
University of Wisconsin–Green Bay	Public	Green Bay	WI
University of Wisconsin–La Crosse	Public	La Crosse	WI
University of Wisconsin–River Falls	Public	River Falls	WI
University of Wisconsin–Stevens Point	Public	Stevens Point	WI
University of Wisconsin–Superior	Public	Superior	WI
Xavier University of Louisiana	Private non-profit	New Orleans	LA
Youngstown State University	Public	Youngstown	OH

== See also ==
- Association of American Universities
- Research university
