= Touro University System =

Private university system headquartered in New York

Touro University
- Type: Private university system
- Established: 1971; 55 years ago
- Religious affiliation: Jewish
- Endowment: $44.5 million (2021)
- Chairman: Mark Hasten
- Chancellor: Doniel Lander
- President: Alan Kadish
- Students: 19,000
- Undergraduates: 6,400
- Postgraduates: 12,600
- Location: New York City, New York, United States; 40.7421224°N 73.9902693°W
- Campus: • Headquarters & main campus and graduate school in New York City • 11 additional graduate schools throughout US • 8 undergraduate schools throughout US • 3 undergraduate schools abroad
- Colors: Blue and White
- Mascot: Touro Bull
- Website: touro.edu

Touro University is a private Jewish university system headquartered in New York City, with branches throughout the United States as well as one each in Germany, Israel, and Russia. It was founded by Bernard Lander in 1971 and named for Isaac and Judah Touro. Its main campus in New York City is the largest private Jewish university in the U.S. Touro initially focused on higher education for the Jewish community, but it now has 113,457 living alumni and serves a diverse population of over 19,000 students across 36 schools and four countries. There are many branches of Touro University, including Lander College for Men and Lander College for Women.

== History ==
Touro received its first charter from the Board of Regents of the State of New York in 1971. It was initially headquartered at 30 West 44th Street.

Touro expanded to not only include its flagship branch Touro University in New York, but also the Touro Law Center, founded in 1980; the School for Lifelong Education, founded in 1989; Touro University California, founded in 1997; and the School of Health Sciences, founded in 1972; Touro has undergraduate offerings in Brooklyn, Queens, and Manhattan.

Touro has further expanded to include Touro University Nevada, Touro College of Osteopathic Medicine, Berlin, Moscow, and Jerusalem, and Los Angeles. It previously had sites in Paris and Miami. Touro University Worldwide, founded in 2008, is the online branch of the university system.

Alan Kadish became president of the Touro system in 2010, and in 2011, the New York Medical College, in Valhalla, New York, was acquired by the Touro family. In 2020, it was announced that a membership agreement had been signed with the New York College of Podiatric Medicine to join the university system. The transaction closed in 2021, after being approved by the U.S. Department of Education, the New York State Department of Education, and other regulators and accreditors.

At the end of 2021, the college signed a lease for 243,305 square feet (22,603.8 m^{2}; 2.26038 ha) at the 3 Times Square building in New York City. The goal was to consolidate many of the college's schools, currently divided among at least 35 separate locations servicing 19,000 enrolled students, into a central Manhattan campus.

In February 2022, Touro College's charter was amended by the New York State Board of Regents to grant Touro university status.

Touro University held the grand opening of its College of Osteopathic Medicine (COM), Great Falls, Montana, location on August 7, 2023.

The New York College of Podiatric Medicine is officially part of Touro University as of February 2025.

== Schools ==
=== Undergraduate schools ===
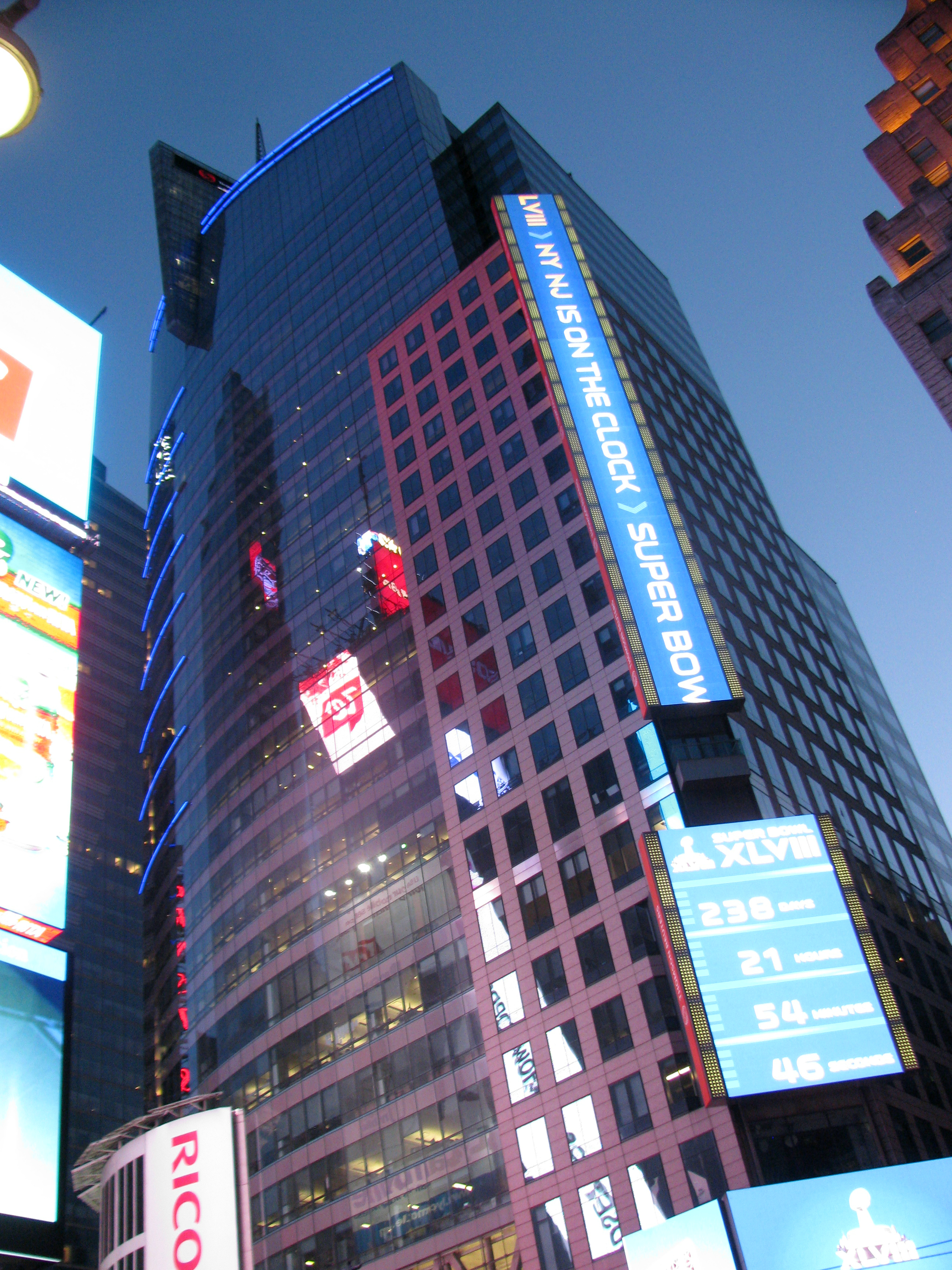
3 Times Square

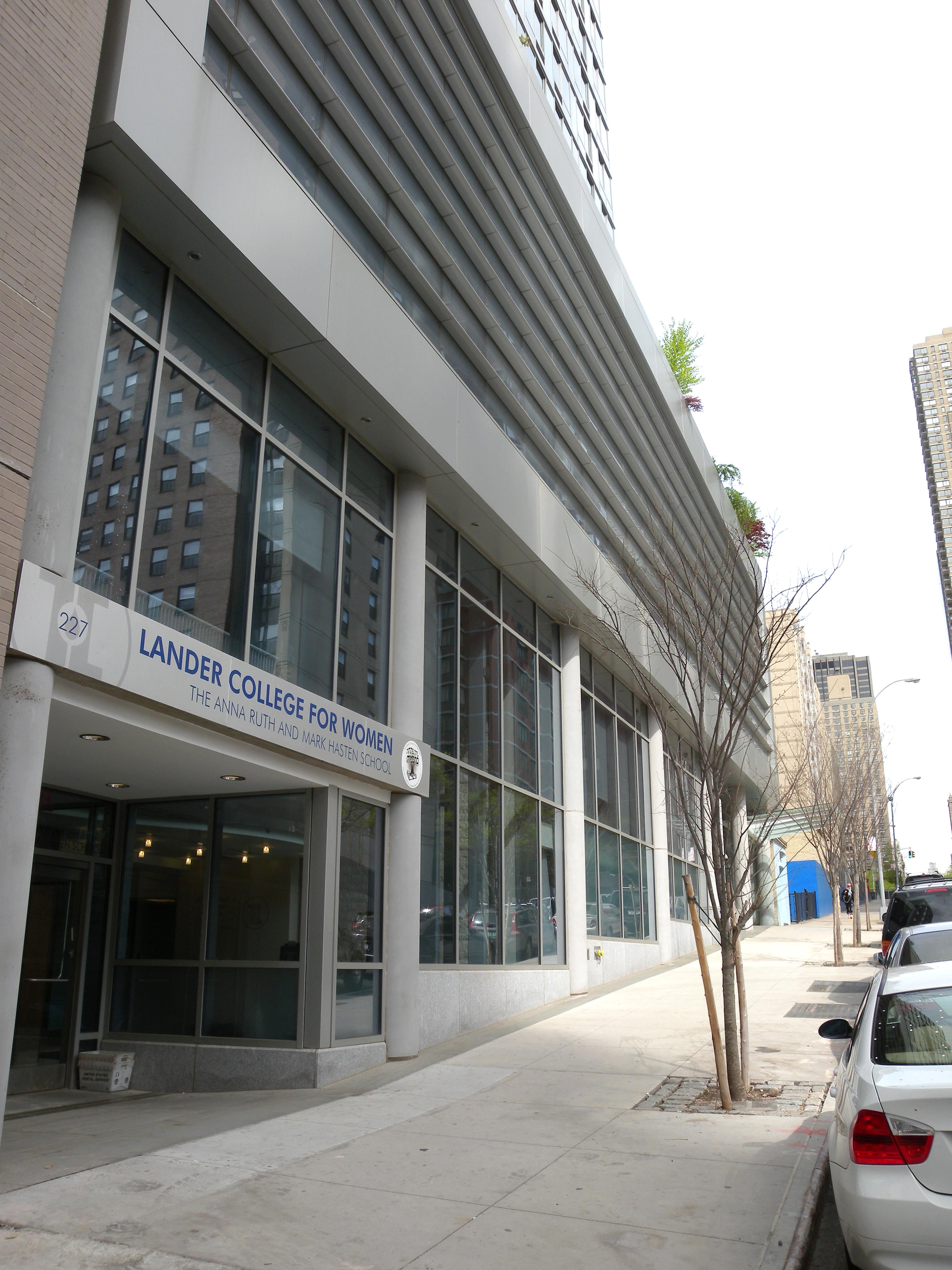
Lander College for Women

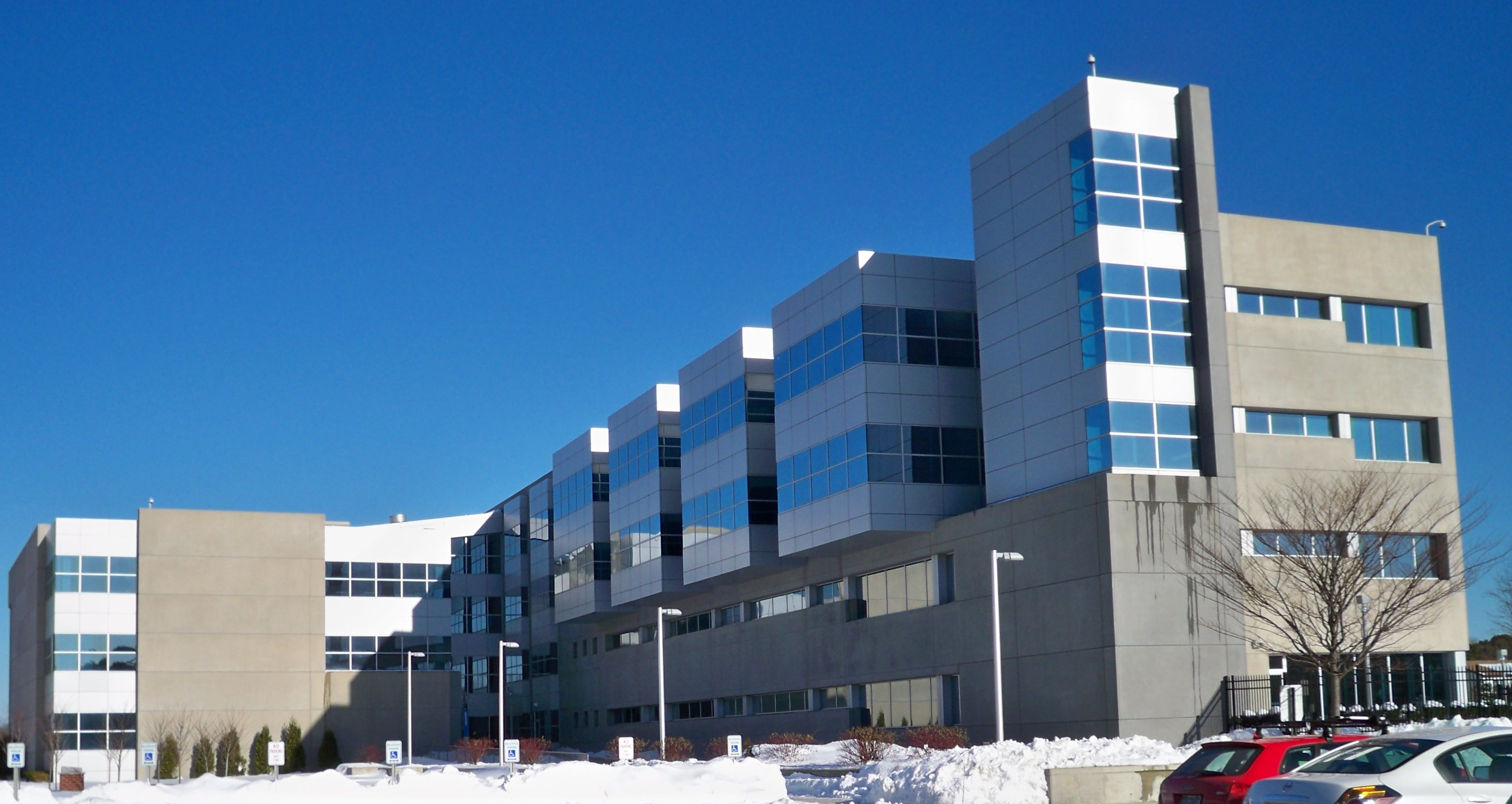
Touro Law Center

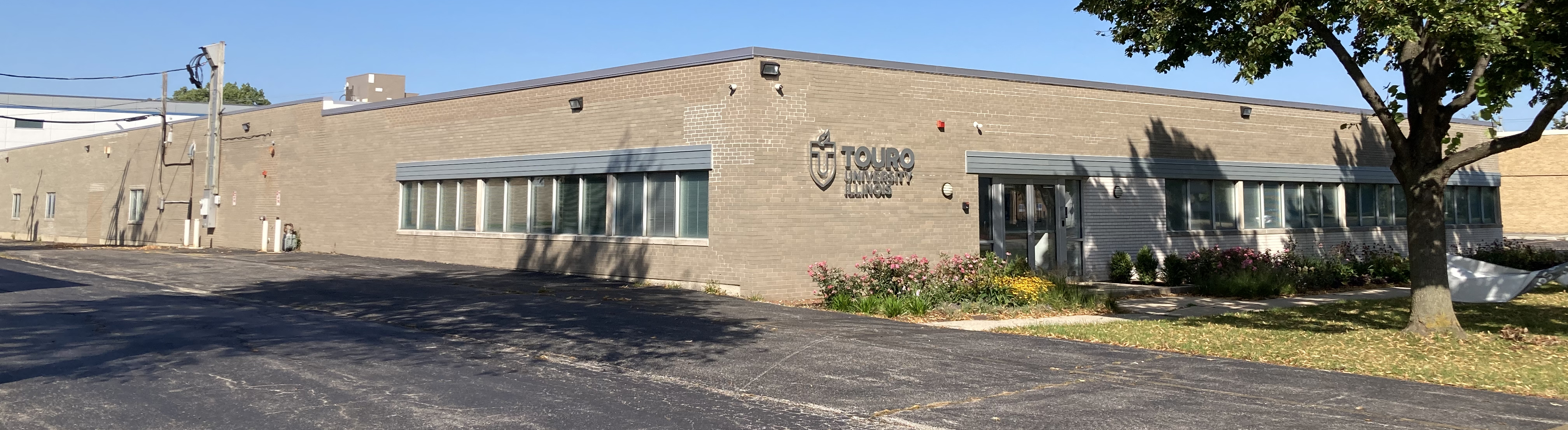
Touro University, Skokie, Illinois, US

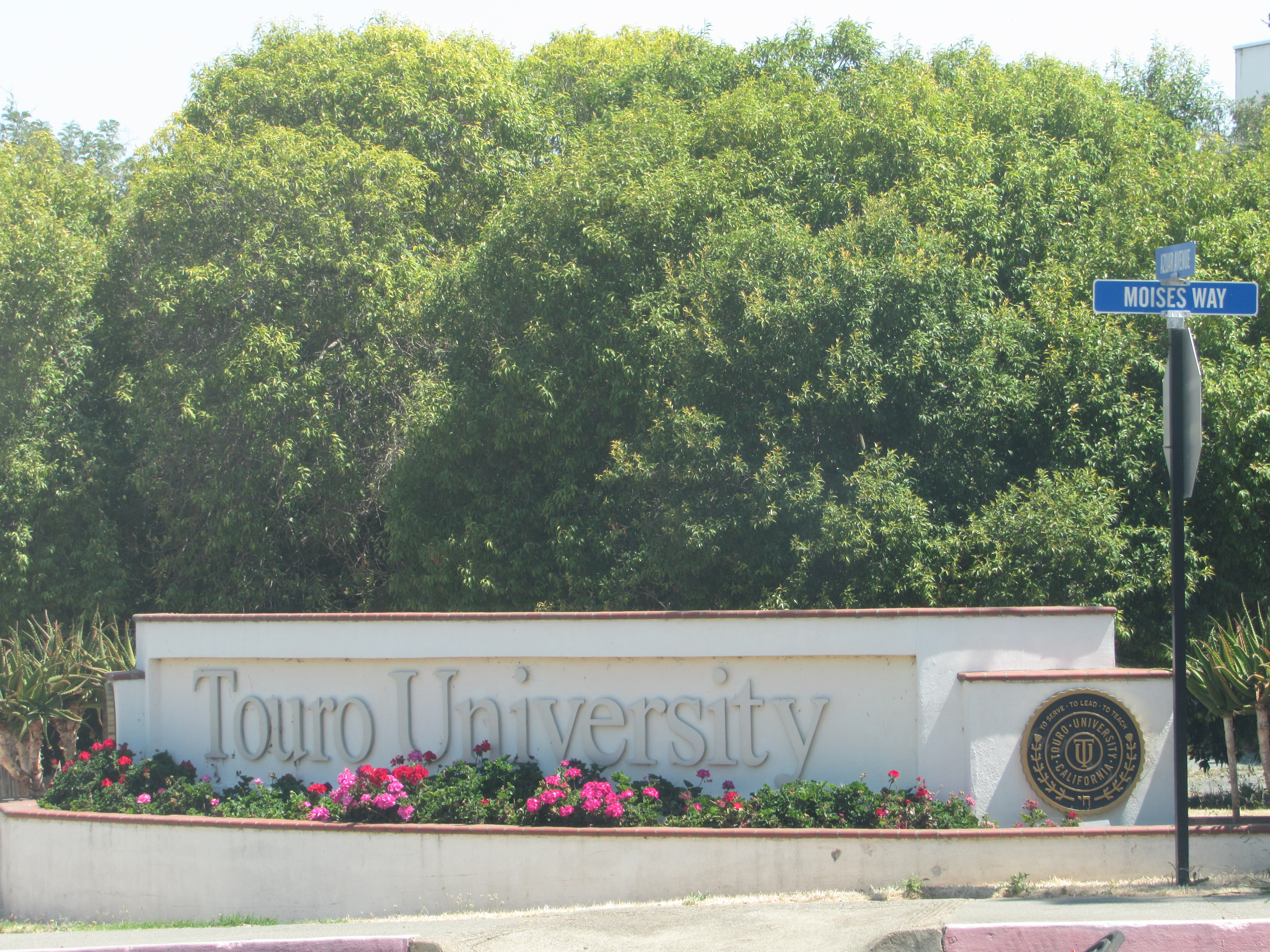
Touro University Mare Island in Vallejo, California

- Hebrew Theological College, in Skokie, Illinois
- Lander College for Men, in Queens, New York
- Lander College for Women, in Manhattan, New York
- Lander College of Arts & Sciences, Brooklyn, New York
- Lander Institute Moscow
- Machon L’Parnasa Institute for Professional Studies
- New York School of Career and Applied Studies (NYSCAS)
- Touro University, 3 Times Square, New York
- Touro College Berlin
- Touro College Israel
- Touro College Los Angeles, West Hollywood, California
- Touro University Worldwide, Los Alamitos, California

=== Graduate schools ===
- New York Medical College, in Valhalla, New York
- Touro College of Dental Medicine, in Hawthorne, New York
- Touro Law Center, in Central Islip, New York
- Touro College of Osteopathic Medicine
- Touro College of Pharmacy, in Manhattan, New York
- Touro Graduate School of Business, in Manhattan, New York
- Touro Graduate School of Education, in Manhattan, New York
- Yeshivas Ohr HaChaim, in Queens, New York
- Touro University Worldwide, Los Alamitos, California
- Touro University California, Vallejo, California
- Touro University Nevada, Henderson, Nevada
- New York College of Podiatric Medicine, in Manhattan, New York
- Touro College Illinois

=== Former schools ===
- Touro College South in Miami, Florida
- Touro University College of Medicine, in Hackensack, New Jersey (proposed, plans abandoned in 2009 and New York Medical College was purchased instead)

== Notable alumni ==
- Rachel Freier (born 1965), American judge
- David G. Greenfield, former member of the New York City Council
- Rivy Poupko Kletenik, educator
- Kenneth LaValle, politician
- James J. Malloy, retired Vice Admiral in the United States Navy
- Boyd Melson, boxer
- Dmitry Salita, former pro boxer

== See also ==
- List of Jewish universities and colleges in the United States
- Yeshiva University
