= Touro University (New York) =

University in New York City

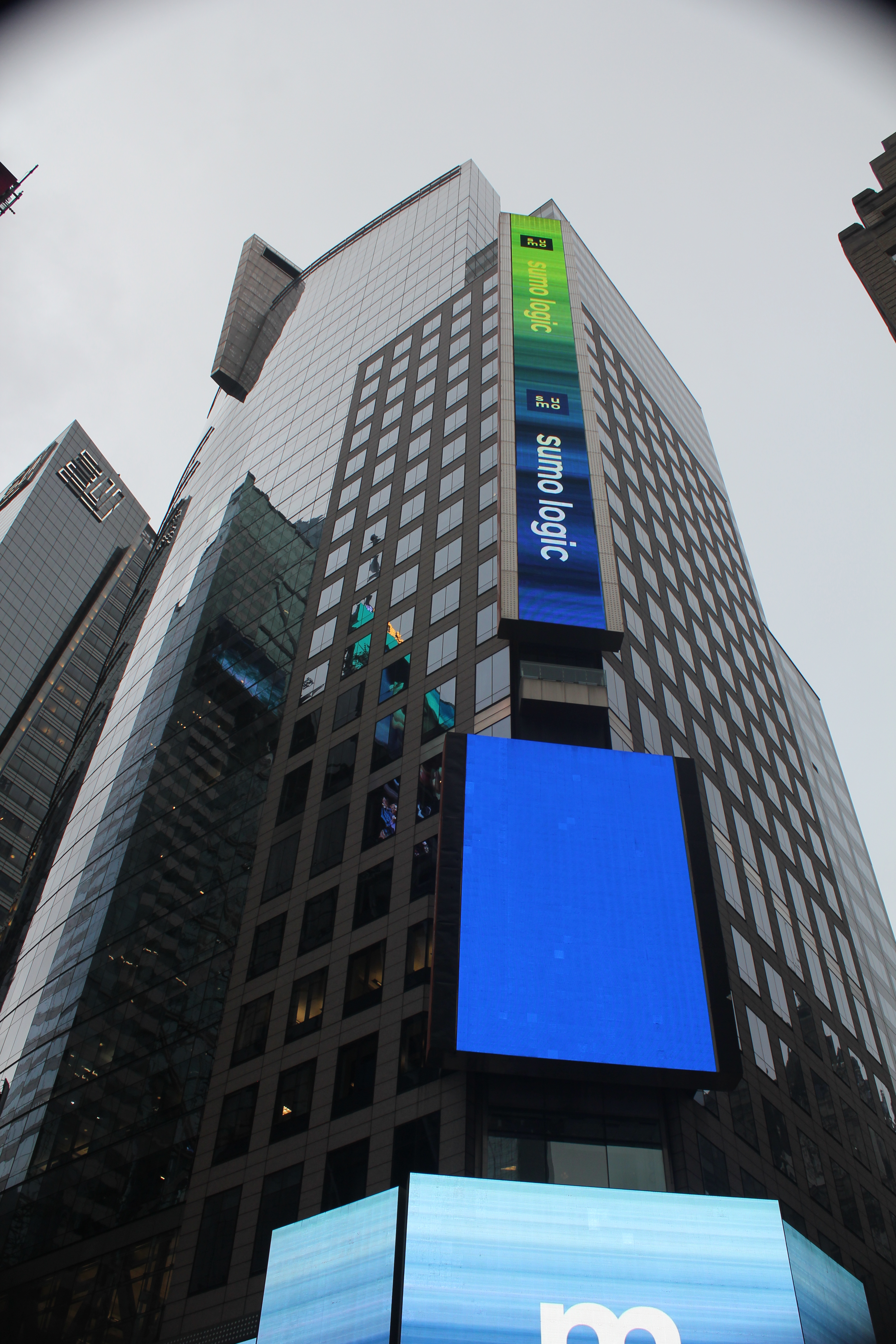
- Type: Private university
- Established: 1971; 55 years ago
- Religious affiliation: Jewish
- Chairman: Mark Hasten
- Chancellor: Doniel Lander
- President: Alan Kadish
- Undergraduates: 5,098
- Postgraduates: 6,855
- Location: New York City, New York, United States; 40.750528°N 73.995833°W
- Colors: Blue and white
- Website: touro.edu

Touro University is a private Jewish university based in New York City, New York. It was founded by Bernard Lander in 1971, and named for Isaac and Judah Touro. It is a part of the Touro University System. Its mission includes a strong focus on "transmit[ting] and perpetuat[ing] the Jewish heritage". Touro’s main campus has been located inside 3 Times Square since in January 2023.

The college has about 5,100 undergraduates, with a teaching staff of 1242, of which over a third are full-time. It has about 6,900 graduate students. About 70% of undergraduates and graduate students are female. Among undergraduates, some 5% are Asian, 13% are black, 11% are Hispanic and 54% are white. The four-year graduation rate is 55%.

== History ==
Touro College was founded by Orthodox rabbi and academic sociologist Bernard Lander, who named it for Isaac Touro, a colonial America Orthodox rabbi, and his son Judah Touro, a businessman and philanthropist.

Lander's aim was to provide education for Jewish people, combining professional courses with Torah studies. The college received its charter as a private, four-year liberal arts college from the Board of Regents of the State of New York in 1970, and opened its doors in 1971. In its first year it had thirty-five students, all men. A section for women was opened in 1974. The college was accredited by the Middle States Commission on Higher Education in 1976; accreditation was reaffirmed in 2015.

In the 1970s, the school enrolled into its adult-education program large numbers of old people, among them many of whom could neither read nor write English. Federal and state authorities subsequently investigated the school, since they believed that this was being done mainly to obtain grants for tuition.

In the early eighties the college expanded to include schools of law, education, social work, osteopathic medicine, pharmacy, and dentistry.

In 2007, at least two school employees were found in an internal college audit to have accepted bribes to change grades and provide fake degrees. They were handed over for prosecution by the college, and were subsequently convicted and imprisoned.

Lander remained president until his death in 2010, and was succeeded by Alan Kadish.

At the end of 2021, the college signed a lease for 243,305 square feet (22,603.8 m^{2}; 2.26038 ha) at the 3 Times Square building in New York City. The goal was to consolidate many of the college's schools, currently divided among at least 35 separate locations servicing 19,000 enrolled students, into a central Manhattan campus.

On February 20, 2022, Touro College announced that the NYS Board of Regents had granted a request to rename the college to Touro University.

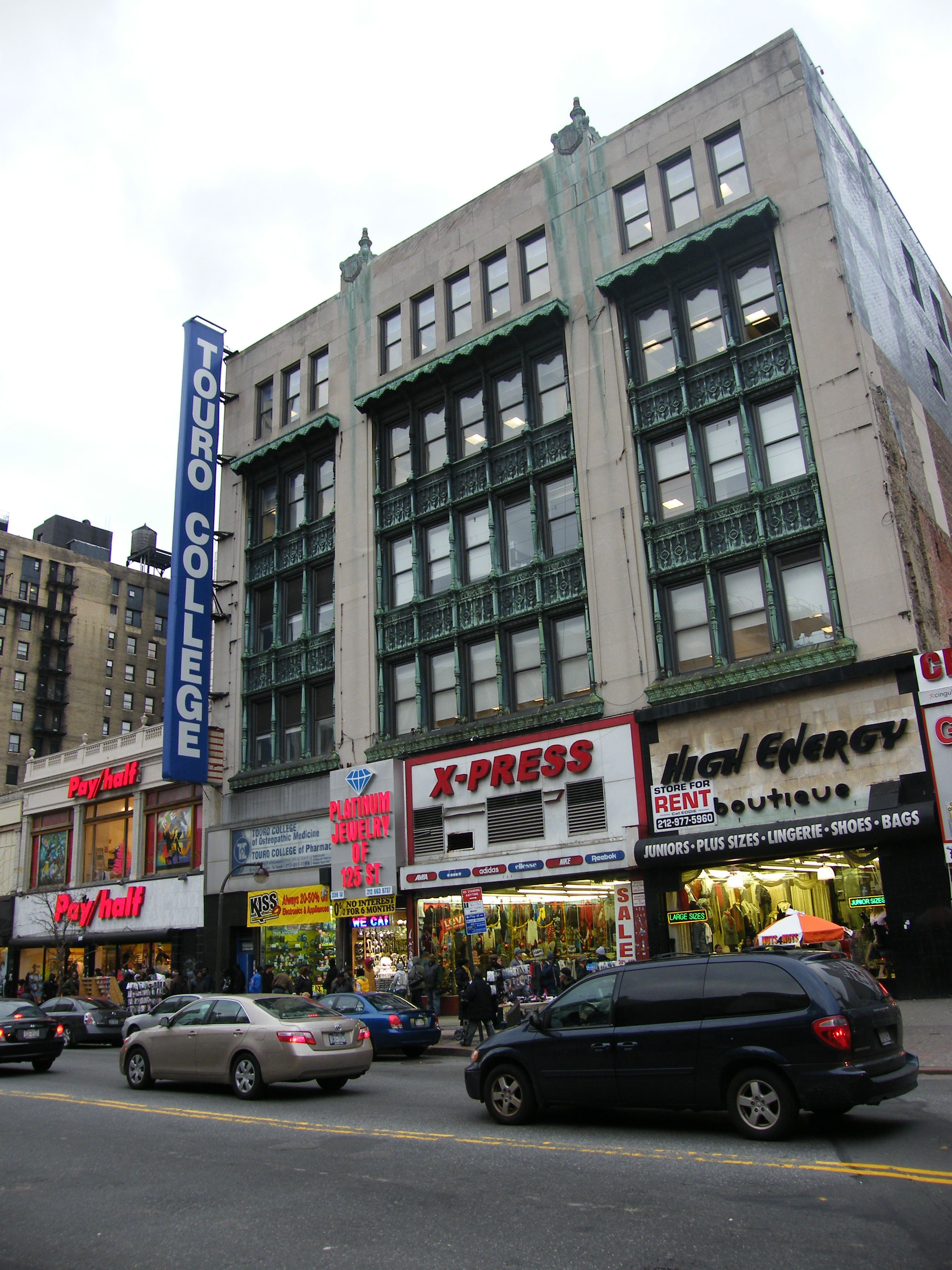
Touro College of Osteopathic Medicine, Harlem

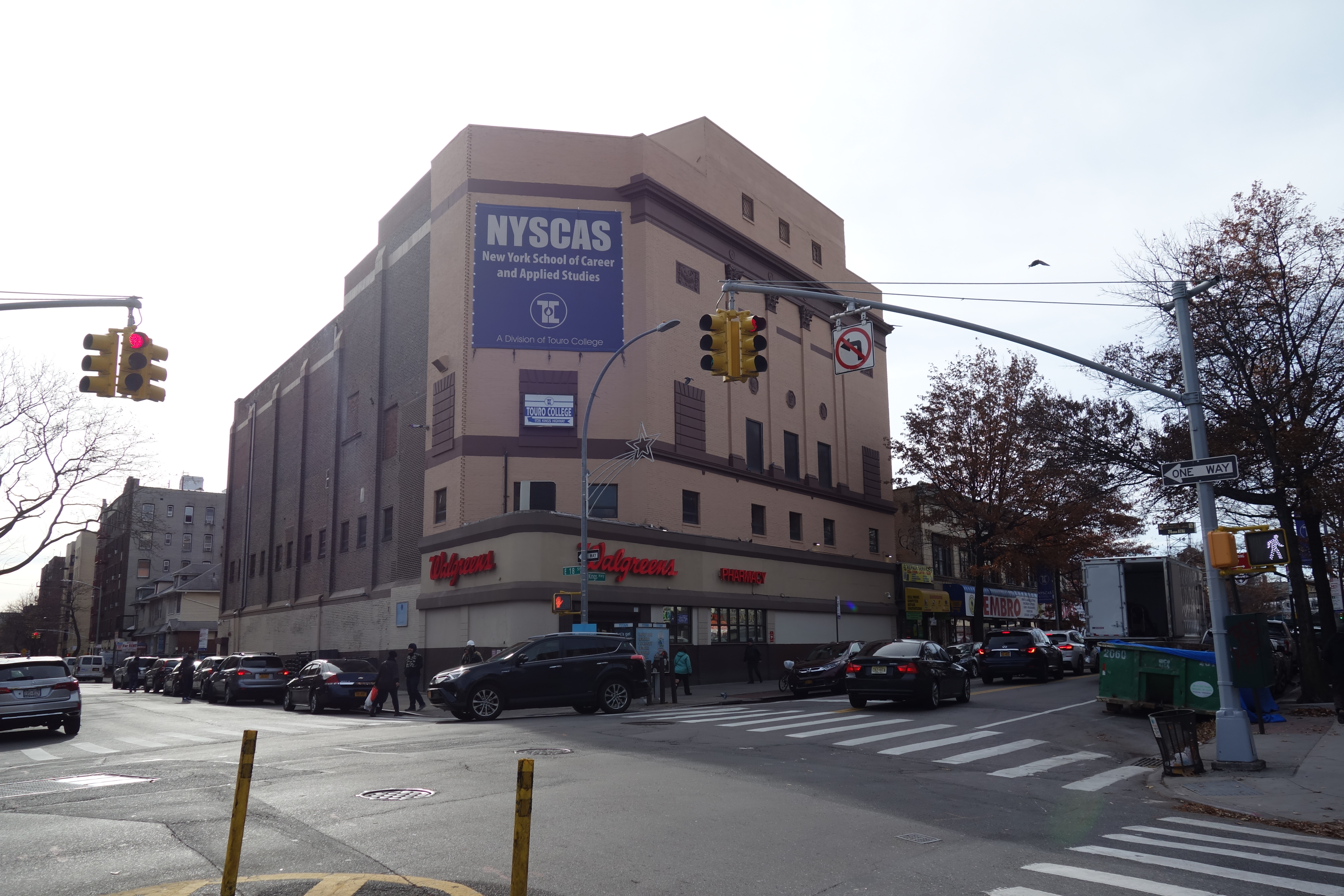
Touro College NYSCAS

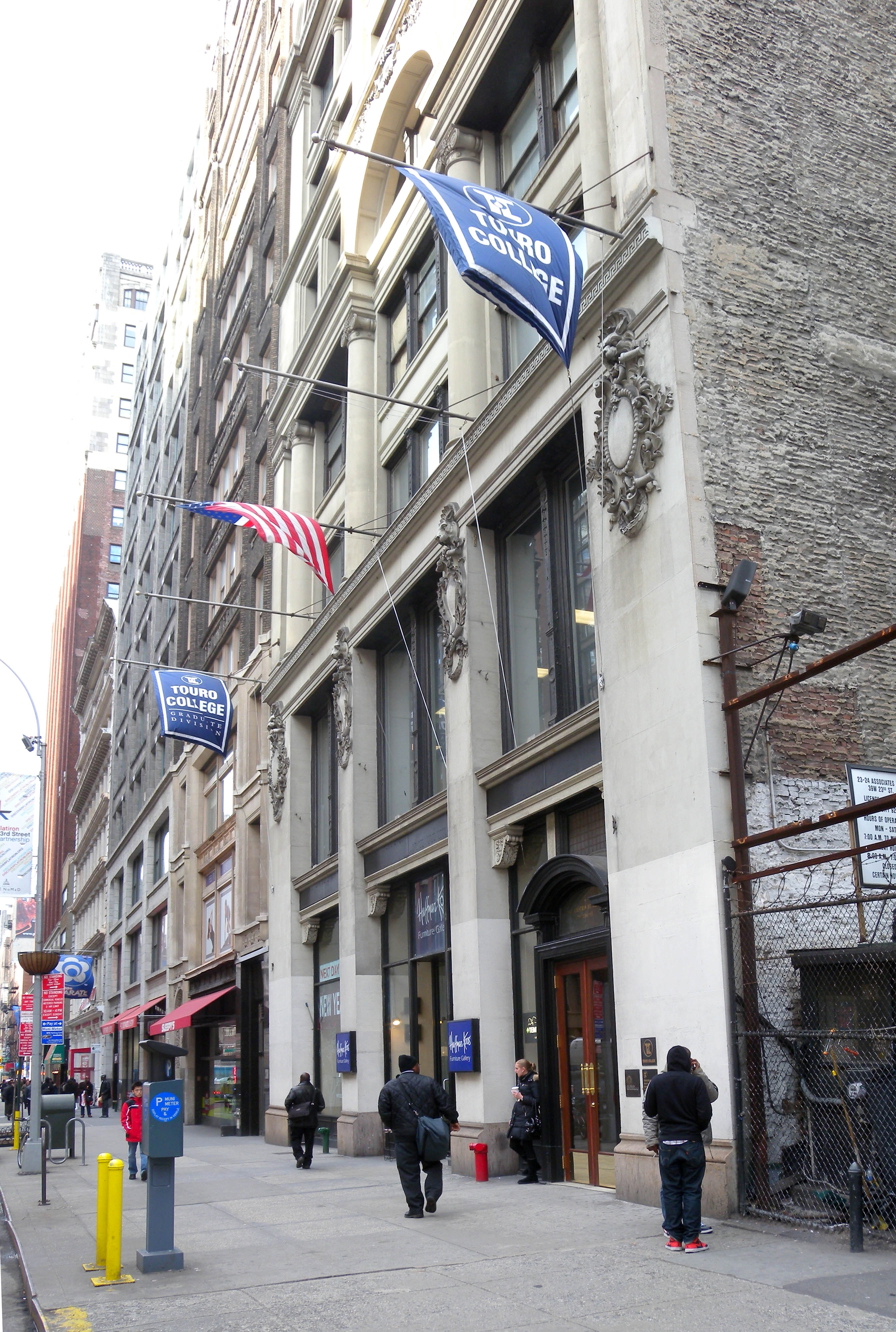
Touro College School of Education and Psychology

== Notable alumni ==
- Marc Alessi, politician
- David G. Greenfield, local politician
- Rivy Poupko Kletenik, teacher
- Kenneth LaValle, politician
- Boyd Melson, boxer
- Kathleen Rice, attorney and politician
- Dmitry Salita, boxer
- Daniel Rosenthal, local politician

== Affiliates ==
- Lander College for Men Queens, New York
- Lander College for Women Manhattan, New York
- Lovelace Respiratory Research Institute Albuquerque, New Mexico
- New York Medical College Valhalla, New York
- Touro College Berlin Charlottenburg
- Touro College Jacob D. Fuchsberg Law Center, Central Islip, New York
- Touro College Los Angeles (TCLA), Los Angeles, California
- Touro Israel Jerusalem, Israel
- Touro University California, Vallejo, California
- Touro University Nevada, Henderson, Nevada
- Touro University Worldwide, Los Alamitos, California

== See also ==
- Henry Abramson
- Marian Stoltz-Loike
