= Walter Hartwig =

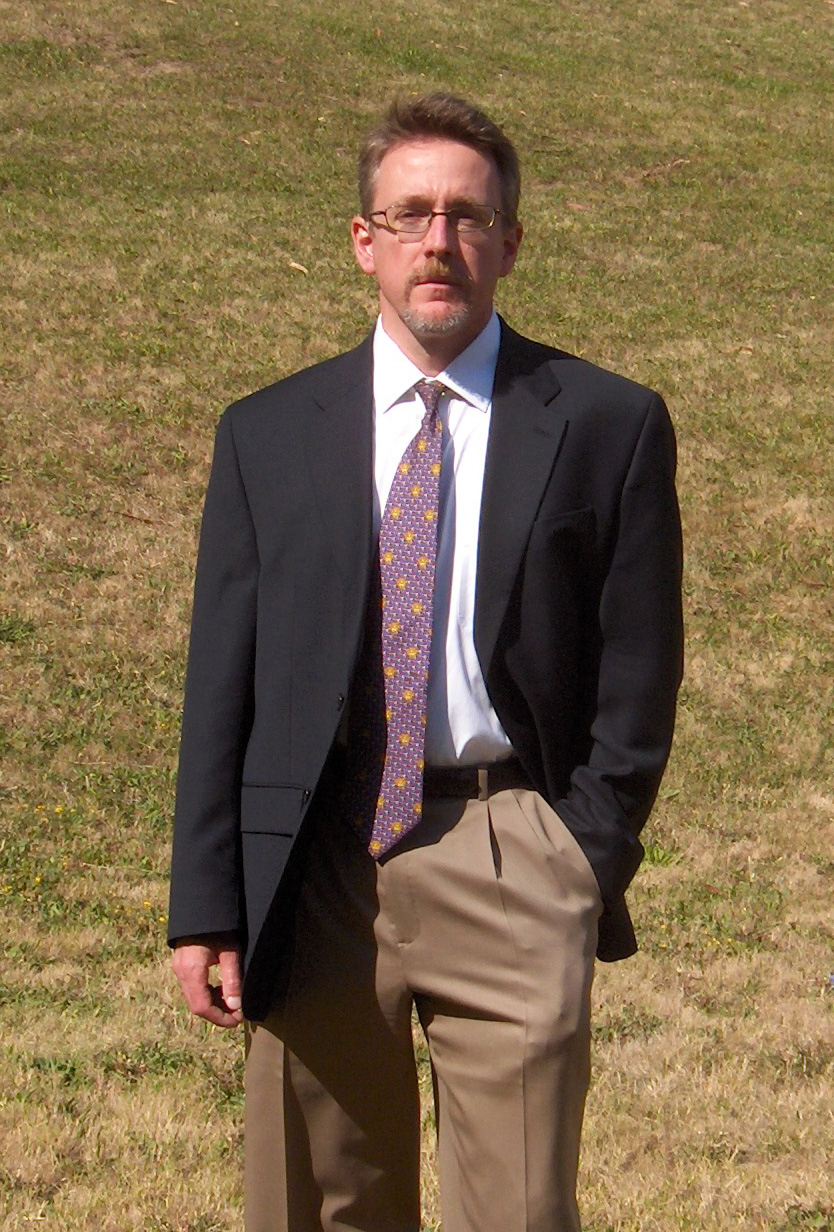
- Photograph of Walter Hartwig, Ph.D., at Touro University California Graduation Ceremony, June 2009
- Education: University of Missouri; University of California at Berkeley
- Occupations: Professor of Anatomy, Anthropologist, Paleontologist
- Employer: Touro University California

Walter Carl Hartwig is an American anthropologist, paleontologist, anatomy professor and author in the San Francisco Bay Area. In July 2020 he became Director of Enrollment Management and Student Success at Touro University California's College of Osteopathic Medicine, where he has served professionally for 25 years.

Walter Hartwig graduated summa cum laude in anthropology at the University of Missouri in 1986. He undertook graduate work in biological anthropology under the late Francis Clark Howell at the University of California at Berkeley in 1986, where he developed an interest in South American monkeys.

== Academic career ==
Fieldwork in Colombia introduced Hartwig to Alfred L. Rosenberger, who soon became a mentor and colleague with whom he collaborated through 2011. Hartwig's early publications emerged from their shared interest in the fossil record of South American monkeys, of which Hartwig once was an international authority.

Hartwig turned to comparative cranial anatomy for his dissertation research, conducted at the Field Museum of Natural History in Chicago. This led to later publications on the relationship of brain development to face development. During his research time in Chicago, Hartwig taught for the University of Illinois at Chicago, Loyola University, and Indiana University – Northwest. After obtaining his Ph.D. from UC-Berkeley in 1993 he moved to Washington, DC, to further his collaborations with Rosenberger, who at that time was a senior postdoctoral fellow at the National Zoo in Washington, D.C.

Later that year, Hartwig accepted a two-year postdoctoral research and teaching position in the Department of Anatomical Sciences at Stony Brook University. He had the opportunity there to work closely with John Fleagle, whose broad vision of primate evolution has been a significant influence in Hartwig’s writings. He moved back to Washington, DC, in 1995 as a Visiting Lecturer for George Washington University, and then returned to Berkeley in 1996 as a Lecturer in Anthropology. In 1997 what is now the Touro University College of Osteopathic Medicine opened in San Francisco and Hartwig joined the founding faculty as an anatomist. He served as Chair of Basic Sciences from 2003–2009, Assistant Dean of Clinical Education from 2010-2013, Chair of Admissions from 2012-2017, and Associate Dean of Academic Affairs from 2013-2020.

== Research ==
Hartwig’s early research in the primate fossil record led to field projects in Brazil, Venezuela, Colombia and Tanzania. Together with eminent Brazilian paleontologist Castor Cartelle he published and named the first evidence of extinct "mega-monkeys", two species that were more than twice the size of any living South American monkey. In 2002, Hartwig edited a critically acclaimed reference volume, The Primate Fossil Record for Cambridge University Press. To date Hartwig has authored three books, and published research in 14 different peer-reviewed journals and nine books across primatology, evolution, education and the history of science. After several years of developing a gross anatomy curriculum in his medical school professorship, Hartwig published a textbook in 2007. Following his medical school administration service he published a guide to medical school admissions and curriculum in 2009, now in its second edition. His interests in scientific credibility have led to an appearance on the Today Show, and testimony in the Supreme Court of New South Wales, Australia.

== Awards and recognition ==
Hartwig’s research has been funded through grants from the National Geographic Society, the Louis S.B. Leakey Foundation, and the Explorers Club. He has received study fellowships from the National Science Foundation, Robert H. Lowie Fellowship, Sigma Xi, and the Thomas J. Dee Foundation. In 2019-20 he was nominated by students to be the American Osteopathic Foundation Educator of the Year.

In 2008 Hartwig became the subject of a Facebook fan site.

== Jeopardy! ==
Hartwig appeared on Jeopardy! on September 20, 2000. After leading going into Final Jeopardy, Hartwig answered the question incorrectly and finished in 2nd place, winning a trip to South Carolina.
