= Chicago ORT Technical Institute =

American vocational training school

Coordinates: 42.016957°N 87.763524°W

- Motto: A Welcoming Community of Practical Learning!
- Type: Nonprofit Organization
- Active: 1991–2017
- Affiliations: World ORT, ORT America
- Students: 300
- Location: Skokie, Illinois, United States
- Campus: Urban
- Colors: Blue White

Chicago ORT Technical Institute, located in Skokie, Illinois, was part of a 130-year-old, worldwide network of more than 800 non-profit vocational training schools.

== About Chicago ORT Technical Institute ==
Chicago ORT Technical Institute was a nonprofit organization offering training programs in the following fields: Information Technology, Health Care, Graphic and Web Design and Accounting and English as a Second Language. The institute was affiliated with ORT America, a volunteer organization that is the umbrella organization of ORT in the United States.

The Institute closed in 2017.

=== History ===
ORT America opened Los Angeles ORT Technical Institute (LAORT) in October 1985 to serve both the Jewish population and the community at large in the Greater Los Angeles area. Chicago ORT Technical Institute was opened in March 1991 in Chicago, as a branch campus of LAORT, and was recognized as a main campus of the institution in 2006. In 2012, Chicago ORT Technical Institute legally separated from LAORT to form Chicago ORT Technical Institute d/b/a Zarem/Golde ORT Technical Institute.

=== World ORT ===
The World Organization for Educational Resources and Technological Training (World ORT) operates a worldwide network of over 800 schools and training centers with an enrollment of more than 200,000 students in 60 countries. World ORT is the world's largest Jewish education and vocational training non-governmental organization.

In 2007, American ORT and Women's American ORT merged to create ORT America, a Jewish organization. ORT America oversees the following ORT programs in the United States:

- Bramson ORT College (New York, NY)
- Los Angeles ORT College (Los Angeles, CA)
- Chicago ORT Technical Institute (Skokie, IL)
- Hermelin ORT Resource Center (Detroit, MI)

=== Affiliates ===
US ORT Operations, Inc. in New York managed Chicago ORT Technical Institute in the northern suburbs of Chicago, Los Angeles ORT College in Los Angeles, California, and Bramson ORT College, a two-year college in New York City, New York. All three were post-secondary technical vocational schools dedicated to providing technology-based education that includes certificate, Associate and bachelor's degrees, and English as a Second Language (ESL) instruction in the ORT tradition.

=== Approvals ===
Chicago ORT Technical Institute was licensed by the Illinois Board of Higher Education to operate and to grant associate degrees. It was also approved by IBHE's Division of Private Business and Vocational Schools to offer certificate programs. The institute was certified by the United States Department of Education as an eligible institution to administer Title IV federal funds. The institute was also authorized by the Department of Veteran Affairs to enroll eligible veterans and is authorized by the U.S. Department of Homeland Security to enroll non-immigrant alien students.

=== Accreditation ===
Chicago ORT Technical Institute was accredited by the Accrediting Council for Continuing Education and Training. The Accrediting Council for Continuing Education and Training was listed as a nationally recognized accrediting agency by the United States Department of Education and was recognized by the Council for Higher Education Accreditation.

=== Articulation agreements ===
Chicago ORT Technical Institute had articulation agreements with the following colleges and universities:

- East-West University
- Westwood College
- Solex College
- Bramson ORT College
- Los Angeles ORT College

=== International students ===
Chicago ORT Technical Institute was authorized by the U.S. Department of Homeland Security to enroll non-immigrant alien students.

=== Physical facilities ===
The institute was located at 5440 W. Fargo Ave., Skokie, IL 60077. The school contained laboratories, general-purpose classrooms, a learning resource center, a student lounge area, and administrative offices. Chicago ORT Technical Institute facilities and equipment fully complied with all federal, state, and local ordinances and regulations, including requirements pertaining to fire safety, building safety, and access for disabled individuals. Additionally, the institute was committed to equal access for students with disabilities.

== Admissions ==
To apply for admission to Chicago ORT Technical Institute, applicants had to be high school graduates, possess a GED or equivalent, and should have reached compulsory age. The compulsory age was 17 years old and above, as defined by the Illinois State Board of Education. The Admissions process included a personal interview with an admissions representative and a tour of the institute. The applicant was given a copy of the catalog, catalog supplement, consumer information (including tuition and fees), and current schedule of program start dates.

== Student services ==
=== Career Services Department ===
Advisors assisted students with job hunting skills: resume and cover letter writing, necessary interviewing abilities and much more. The Institute offered current students and alumni job leads, personalized job advising, and workshops geared toward professionalism in the workplace.

=== Financial aid ===
US Department of Education Title IV Programs, payment plans, as well as institutional scholarships were available for eligible students.

=== Learning Center ===
The Learning Center was available seven days a week to all students. The staff provided tutoring assistance and offered individual attention to students for no extra cost.

=== Transportation and parking ===
School-supplied transportation was also available for a nominal fee. Convenient, free parking was available for students, faculty and staff at the school or at a nearby parking lot.

=== Housing ===
The Institute did not maintain housing accommodations for students.

== See also ==
- List of Jewish universities and colleges in the United States
- Bramson ORT College
- World ORT
