= Bramson ORT College =

Coordinates: 40°43′17.22″N 73°50′54.83″W

Bramson ORT College
- Type: Private college
- Active: 1979–2017
- Affiliations: World ORT
- Location: New York City, New York, United States
- Campus: Urban
- Website: Bramsonort.edu

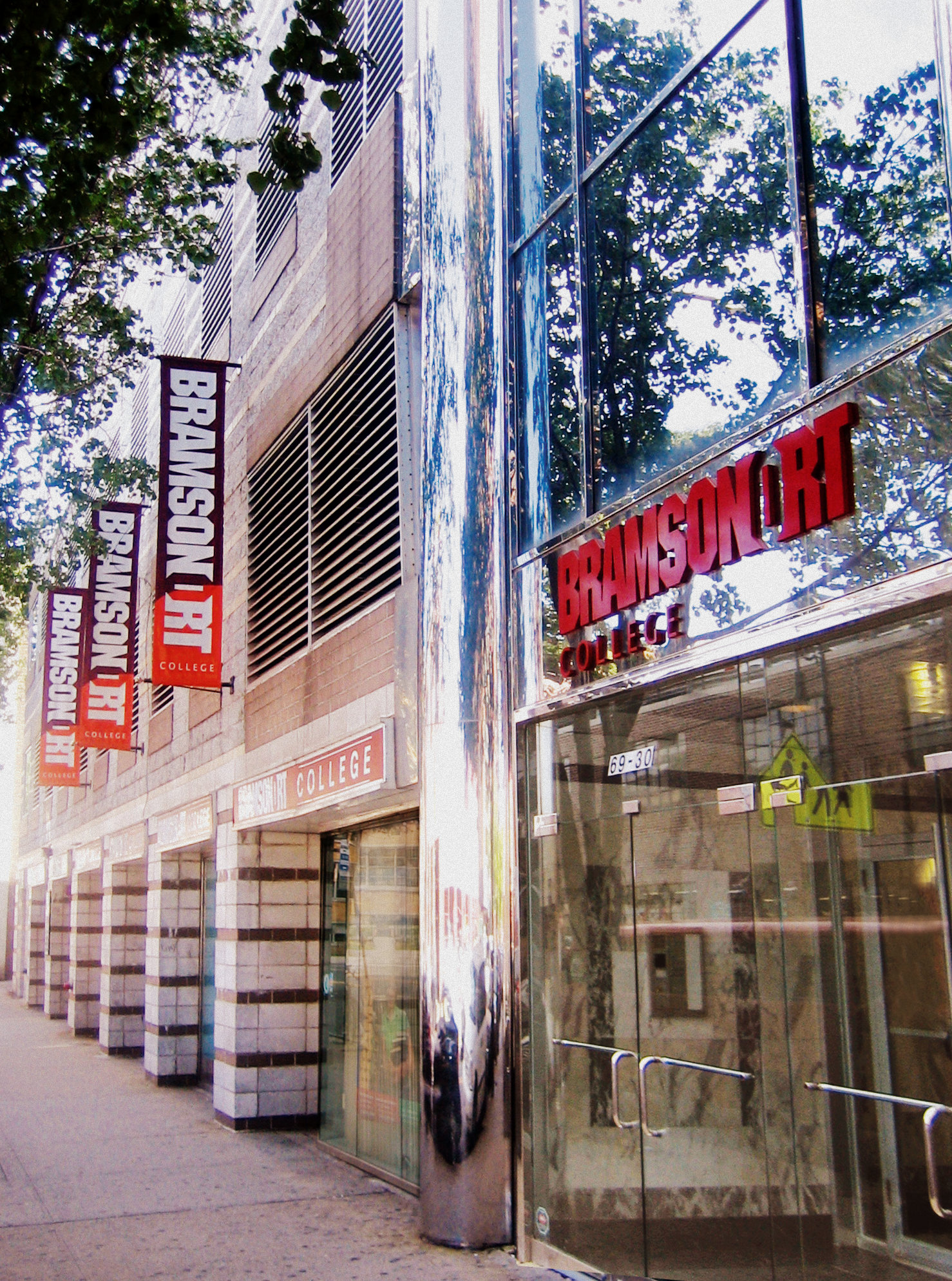
Bramson ORT College 69-30 Austin Street

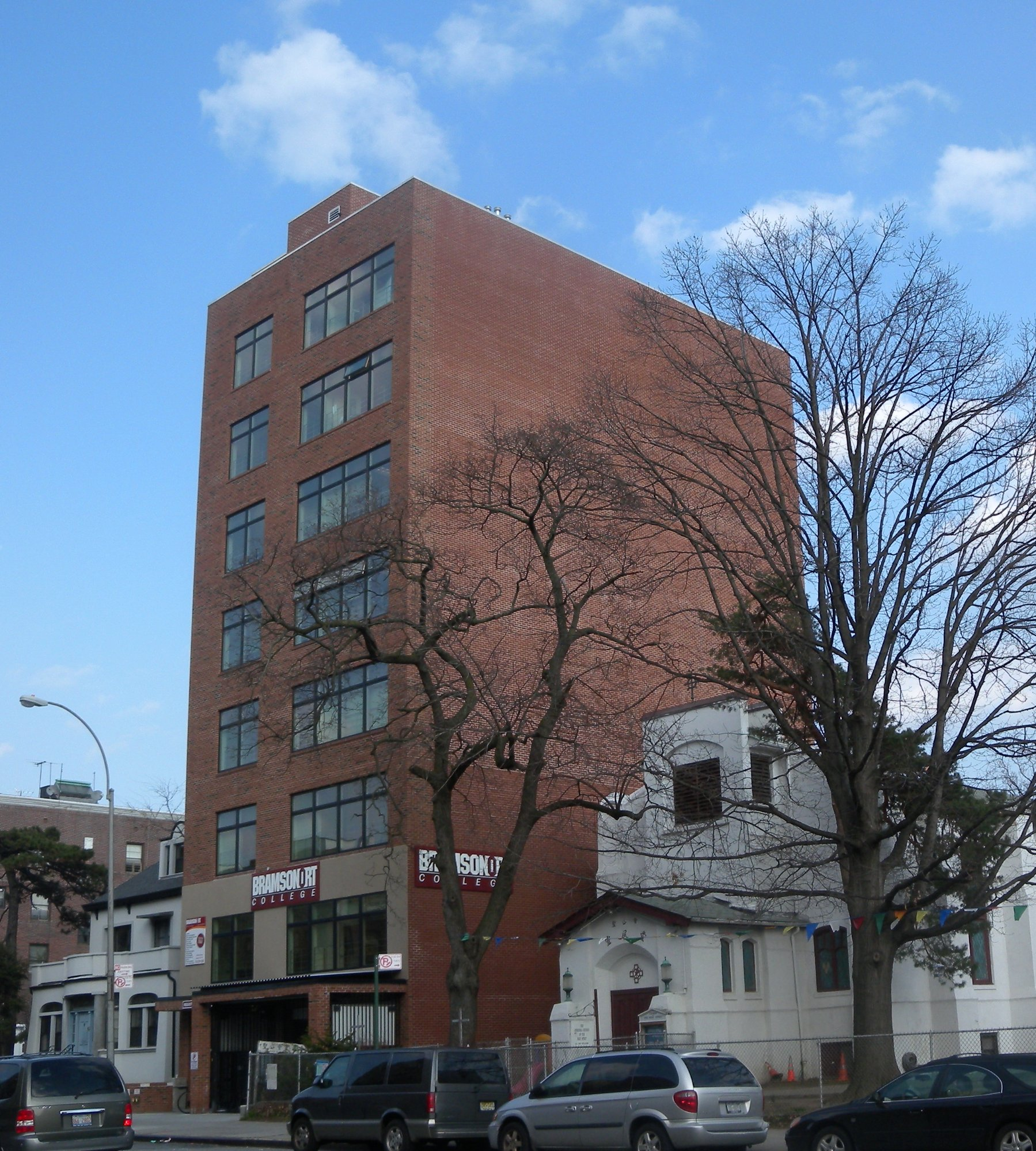
Brooklyn

Bramson ORT College was a private college in New York City. Its main campus was located in Forest Hills, Queens, with a satellite campus in Brooklyn. It was affiliated with ORT America, a volunteer organization that is the umbrella organization of ORT in the United States, and World ORT, the parent nonprofit global Jewish organization that promotes education and training in over 100 countries. It was founded in 1979 and closed in 2017.

== History ==
Bramson ORT was established in 1942 to serve refugees and immigrants during World War II. In 1979, Bramson ORT Training Center became Bramson ORT Technical Institute. It officially became a Bramson ORT College in 1996 to provide quality technical post-secondary education and to meet the educational and career needs of the New York Community. Bramson ORT lost its accreditation January 10, 2017 and shut down its operations in February 2017.

== World ORT ==
The World Organization for Educational Resources and Technological Training (World ORT) operates a worldwide network of over 800 schools and training centers with an enrollment of more than 200,000 students in 60 countries. World ORT is the world's largest Jewish education and vocational training non-governmental organization. In 2007, American ORT and Women's American ORT merged to create ORT America, a Jewish organization. ORT America oversees the following ORT programs in the United States:

- Bramson ORT College (New York, NY)
- Los Angeles ORT College (Los Angeles, CA)
- Chicago ORT Technical Institute (Skokie, IL).

ORT (Organization for Educational Resource &Technological Training) is an international organization which strives to bring economic self-sufficiency to world Jewry. Since the establishment of the organization in 1880, ORT schools have provided vocational and technical education to more than two million people.

== Programs ==
Bramson ORT college collaborated with B'derech, an organization run by Civil Court Judge Rachel Freier. The Bderech program catered to the Chareidi and Chasidic communities of Flatbush Boro Park, Williamsburg, Monsey and beyond. Bderech students participated in the ATB program earning their GED alongside their associate degree. The men's program began in 2012 and offered degrees in business, accounting, programming, networking and graphic design. The women's program began in the Spring 2014 semester and offered degrees in business, medical assisting, graphic design and paralegal.

== Facilities ==
Originally based in Manhattan at 23rd Street and Park Avenue South, it relocated to Queens in 1988. The college was located at 69-30 Austin Street in Forest Hills, Queens with an extension center in Bay Parkway, Brooklyn and an annex in Kew Gardens, Queens.

== Accreditation ==
Bramson ORT College was accredited by the Board of Regents of the University of the State of New York. Associate's degree, certificate and diploma programs are registered by the New York State Education Department, which has accredited the school since 1979. Bramson ORT College was a not-for-profit educational institution. Effective January 10, 2017, the New York State Education Department Board of Regents denied Bramson Ort College's renewal of accreditation. As a result, the college stopped enrolling new students and created a teach-out plan for its enrolled students.

On January 18, 2017, officials representing Bramson alerted the U.S. Department of Education of the cessation of operations as a degree-granting institution on February 20, 2017, and that instruction at their Forest Hills and Brooklyn locations in New York would end.

== See also ==
- List of defunct colleges and universities in New York
- List of Jewish universities and colleges in the United States
