= Alan Kadish =

Alan H. Kadish
- Born: Brooklyn, New York, U.S.
- Education: Columbia University (BA); Yeshiva University (MD)
- Occupations: Cardiologist, researcher, educator, writer
- Known for: President at Touro University

Alan H. Kadish (born August 18, 1956) is an American cardiologist and the second president of Touro University. Kadish succeeded Touro's founder, Rabbi Bernard Lander, who died on February 8, 2010. Kadish came to Touro in 2009 as senior provost and chief operating officer. At the time of his appointment, Touro's Board of Trustees stated that Kadish eventually would succeed Lander as president.

== Early life and education ==
Born in Brooklyn, Kadish attended Yeshiva University High School for Boys. Kadish graduated summa cum laude from Columbia University in 1977 and was elected Phi Beta Kappa. At Columbia, he was classmates with future United States Ambassador to Belgium, Howard Gutman and New York Governor David Paterson. He received his M.D. from the Albert Einstein College of Medicine at Yeshiva University, followed by his residency at Brigham and Women's Hospital, Boston (1983), and a fellowship in cardiology at the Hospital of the University of Pennsylvania, Philadelphia (1987). He then joined the faculty of the University of Michigan as an associate professor of internal medicine.

== Career ==
In 1990, Kadish began his long association with Northwestern University's Feinberg School of Medicine, Chicago. He was named the Chester C. and Deborah M. Cooley Distinguished Professor of Cardiology in 1993 and eventually rose to the position of Associate Chief of Cardiology and Director of Clinical Trials at the Bluhm Cardiovascular Institute at Northwestern Memorial Hospital, the primary teaching affiliate for the Feinberg School of Medicine.

Though Kadish left Chicago at the time of his appointment at Touro, he retains an affiliation with the Feinberg Cardiovascular Research Institute and continues on the Feinberg faculty as an adjunct professor in Medicine – Cardiology. He is board-certified in cardiovascular disease, clinical cardiac electrophysiology and internal medicine.

Kadish is the author or co-author of more than 250 peer-reviewed articles in his field. He is a fellow of the American College of Cardiology. He also is a member of the American Heart Association, American Association of Professors, American Society for Clinical Investigation and the American Society of Physicians.

Kadish has published numerous articles on the intersection of science and religion, including "Outer Limits of Biotechnologies: A Jewish Perspective" published in Rambam Maimonides Medical Journal.

As president of Touro, Kadish oversaw the acquisition of New York Medical College in 2012. In 2016, Kadish oversaw the opening of New York State's first Dental school in nearly 50 years.

== Personal life ==
Kadish and his wife, the former Connie Eleff, have four children.
