= Touro College Berlin =

Coordinates: 52.5051°N 13.2132°E

Touro University Berlin
- Type: Private university system
- Established: 2003
- Accreditation: MSCHE
- Provost: Jane Williams-Boock
- Students: < 250
- Location: Berlin, Germany
- Website: www.touroberlin.de

Touro University Berlin is a small independent American college in Berlin, Germany.

Touro University Berlin was founded in 2003 as the first and only Jewish-American college in Germany. The college is part of the Touro University System network, with branches in New York, Paris, Moscow, Jerusalem, and elsewhere. All Touro Colleges have an American background, but students and faculty at Touro University Berlin come from all over the world, hence the language of instruction is English.

Touro University Berlin offers four-year undergraduate degrees in Business and Psychology and a Master of Business Administration. Students can obtain a German and a US degree at the same time if they are eligible. Graduate students can also study for the MA Holocaust Communication and Tolerance. Touro University Berlin is fully accredited by the de:Wissenschaftsrat and by the Middle States Commission on Higher Education and New York State Department of Education.

Touro University Berlin is the only college in Germany where it is possible to study a full MA program on the history of the Holocaust. The college is in the Paul Lindemann villa, designed by modernist architect Bruno Paul, in the suburb of Charlottenburg, overlooking the Havel river.

In February 2022, the New York State Board of Regents granted Touro College university status, and the Berlin campus was subsequently renamed Touro University Berlin.

== See also ==
- Stephan Lehnstaedt
