= Doniel Lander =

Rabbi Doniel Lander is the chancellor of Touro University and the Rosh Yeshiva of Yeshivas Ohr HaChaim, Mesivta Yesodei Yeshurun in Queens, NY and Mesivta Yesodei Hatorah in Naugatuck, CT.

He learned in YU and got semicha from the Rav. He was previously Rosh Yeshiva of Mesivta Yesodei Yisroel in Elkins Park, PA until it closed in June 2023.

Lander is also the founder of KT Estates, a private gated community based around Mesivta Yesodei Hatorah and The Naugatuck Kollel in Naugatuck, CT.

Lander is the author of the Sefer Chamudei Daniel on Seder Taharos, published in 2026. The work offers in-depth analysis of some of the most complex laws in the Mishnayos, further establishing his reputation in the world of Rabbinic literature.

His father Bernard Lander was also a rabbi.
