= Yeshivas Ohr HaChaim =

School in Flushing, New York, United States

Coordinates: 40°43′41.07″N 73°49′22.09″W

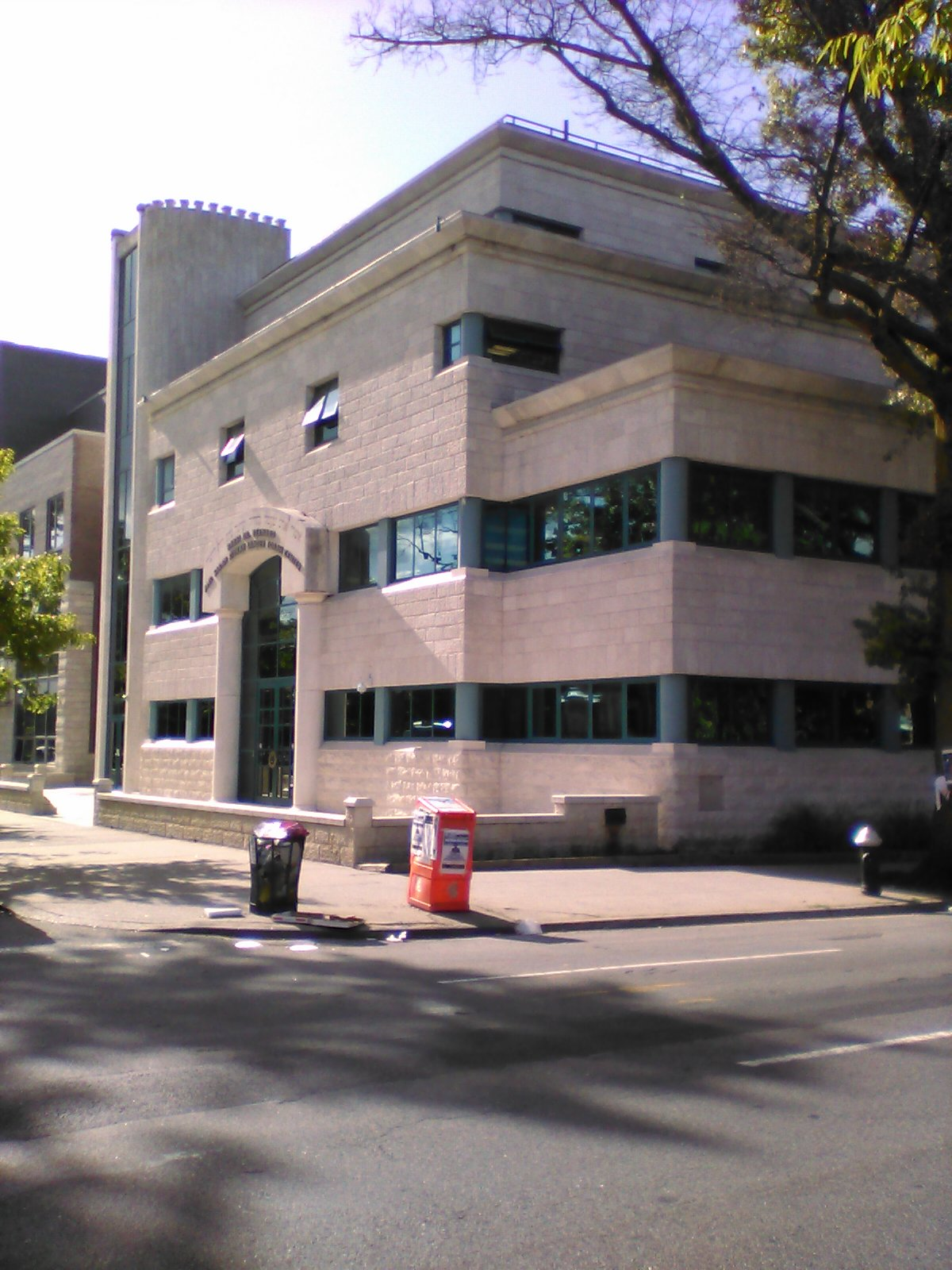

Location
- 141-61 71st Avenue; Flushing, New York 11367; United States

Information
- Denomination: Haredi Judaism
- Established: 1983; 43 years ago
- Rosh yeshiva: Doniel Lander
- Rosh kollel: Shmuel Rabinovici
- Mashgiach ruchani: Mordechai Finkelman

Yeshivas Ohr Hachaim is a Haredi (ultra-orthodox) yeshiva located in Kew Garden Hills, Queens, New York City. The yeshiva also has a kollel, and operates in conjunction with its high school Mesivta Yesodei Yeshurun which is located next door to Yeshivas Ohr Hachaim. The Rosh Yeshiva (dean) is Rabbi Doniel Lander and the Rosh Kollel is Rabbi Shmuel Rabinovici. Both are former students of Rabbi Joseph B. Soloveitchik of Yeshiva University.

The yeshiva building is prominently located on Main Street in Kew Gardens Hills. The building is noted for its exterior, which is primarily made of Jerusalem stone (so named for being both common and legally required for construction in Jerusalem) imported from Israel specifically for the building.

Rabbi Mordechai Finkelman serves as mashgiach ruchani of the yeshiva. He is a senior member of the Emunas Yisroel branch of chassidim and was known for his close relationship with the branch's founder and leader, Rabbi Moshe Wolfson.

Rabbi Mordechai Krauss was one of the Roshei Yeshiva until his death in 2016. He was a student of Rabbi Binyomin Paler and Rabbi Berel Soloveitchik.

== History ==
Yeshivas Ohr Hachaim was founded in 1983. Its first location was at Congregation Bnei Abraham. As the yeshiva continued to grow and attract more students, it needed to move to a bigger location. Two years after it was founded, in 1985, the yeshiva moved to a new location. A synagogue was rented at 69-69 Main Street that served as a Bais Medrash. But soon after, the burgeoning enrollment of the yeshiva called for yet another move. In the 1990s a series of attached houses from the corner house of 71st Avenue and Main Street down the block were purchased and construction on the new building began.

== The New Building ==
In the fall of 1991 the new building began its construction. Five houses adjacent to the existing location were acquired and demolished. Bobby Jacobs and Aryeh Rabinowitz designed the building and supervised the construction. For the next four years, the yeshiva found a temporary home at Congregation Ohel Simcha. Finally, in October 1996 the new facilities were ready to open.

== High schools ==
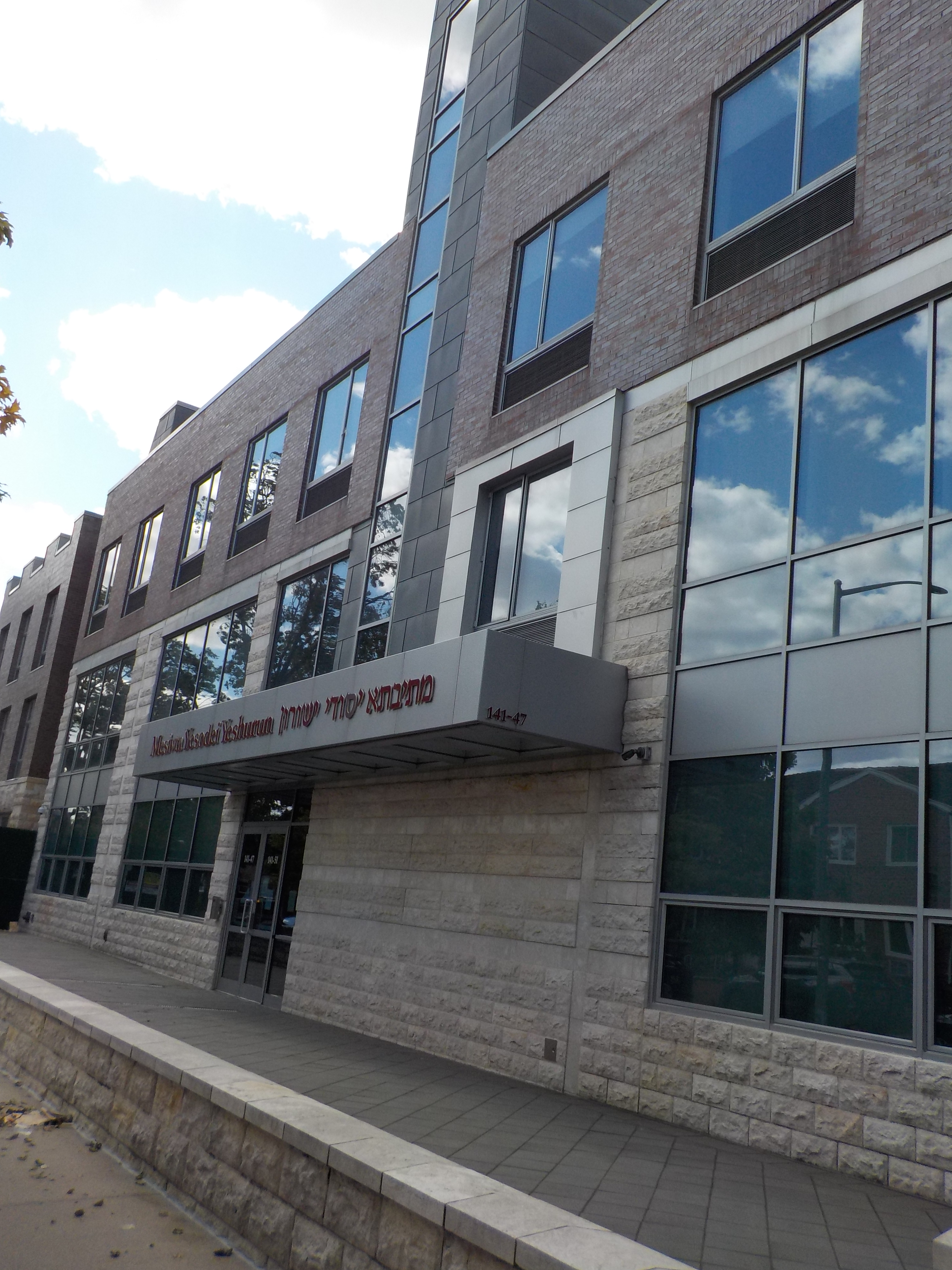
The building of the Mesivta Yesodei Yeshurun high school, next door to Yeshivas Ohr HaChaim in Kew Gardens Hills, Queens

Founded under the umbrella of Ohr HaChaim in 1993, Mesivta Yesodei Yeshurun is a four-year high school whose curriculum is largely Yeshiva-preparatory. Senior year programming dovetails with the yeshiva's resulting in significant overlap of scheduling and facility use. The twelfth grade Yeshiva program primarily takes place in the Ohr HaChaim building while the school's home is in a purpose-built four-story building adjacent to the Yeshiva building, on 71st Ave. The building includes dormitories for students from Jewish communities from the Greater New York City metro area, as well from around the United States and Canada. In addition, there is a full-court basketball gym in the lower basement, a common feature in vertically built New York City schools.

The Yeshiva currently has one branch high school, Mesivta Yesodei HaTorah in Naugatuck, Connecticut, under the leadership of Rabbi Aryeh Reiss. The school also has a 55 acre development community and a Kollel on the grounds. Additionally, there was a second High School branch in Elkins Park, PA on the Jewish Federation Campus, but it has since closed. There was also a school Mesivta Yesodei Yisroel in Monsey, NY from 2004 till 2014 before the campus was sold and the school shut down.
