= Bernard Lander =

Founder and first president of Touro College

Rabbi Dr. Bernard Lander
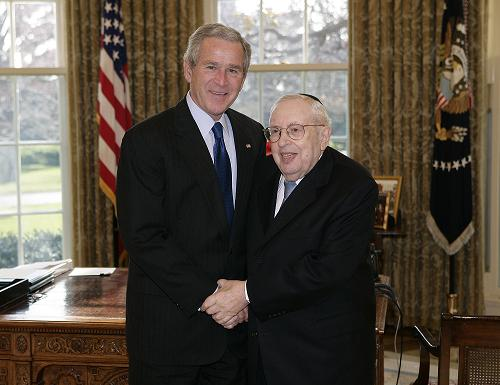
- Lander (right) with President George W. Bush in 2006

Personal life
- Born: June 17, 1915
- Died: February 8, 2010 (aged 94) Forest Hills, New York

Religious life
- Religion: Judaism
- Denomination: Orthodox

Jewish leader
- Position: Founder, Touro College
- Organisation: Touro College

Bernard Lander (June 17, 1915 – February 8, 2010), founder and first president of Touro College, was a rabbi, social scientist and educator, a leader in the Jewish community and a pioneer in Jewish and general higher education.

== Biography ==
Lander went to Yeshiva University High School for Boys and graduated from Yeshiva University and earned a PhD in sociology from Columbia University, with a dissertation exploring "how the schools, police and courts deal with juvenile delinquency." He was ordained as an Orthodox rabbi at the age of 21.

Lander was one of three associate directors of the Mayor's Committee on Unity, established in 1944 by former New York City Mayor Fiorello La Guardia, which became the city's first Commission on Human Rights. The commission prepared the first civil rights legislation for New York state.

He served as a professor of sociology for over two decades at Hunter College and at Yeshiva University, where he established the university's graduate schools of education, psychology and social work and served as dean of its Bernard Revel Graduate School.

In 1971, he founded Touro College and presided over its growth into a multi-campus, international university with approximately 18,000 students at campus locations in New York, California, Florida, Nevada, Israel, Russia and Germany.

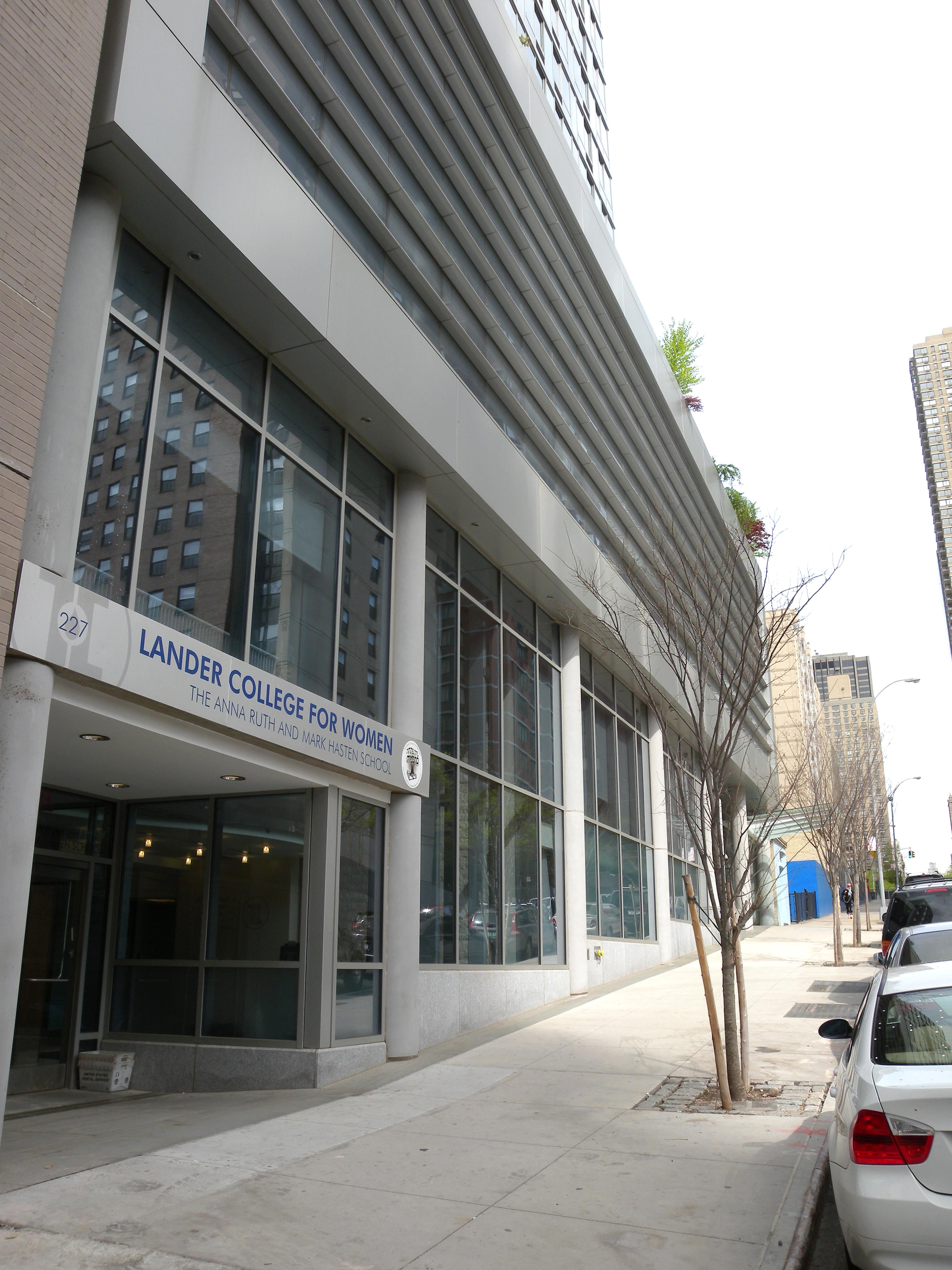
Lander College for Women

Lander served as a consultant to three United States Presidents and was part of the seven-member commission that established the historic War on Poverty program in the U.S. He served as a consultant to the White House Conference on Children and Youth; on an advisory council on public assistance established by Congress; and was a member of the President's Advisory Committee on Juvenile Delinquency and Youth Crime under the Johnson and Kennedy administrations.

For eight years he served as a senior director of a national study for the University of Notre Dame of South Bend, Indiana on the problems of youth. He is the author of a book and numerous articles in the field of sociology. He also served as a consultant to the Maryland State Commission on Juvenile Delinquency. Lander has been honored by the Council of New York State College Presidents for his lifetime contributions to higher education. A former Rabbi of Beth Jacob Congregation of Baltimore and former president of the Queens Jewish Center in Forest Hills, Queens (NY), Lander was also an Honorary Vice President of the Union of Orthodox Jewish Congregations of America.

Lander was the recipient of the landmark ruling by Rabbi Moshe Feinstein concerning the Orthodox position on Christian-Jewish dialogue in a 1967 letter published in Igros Moshe.

His son, Rabbi Doniel Lander, is the rosh yeshiva of Yeshivas Ohr HaChaim in Queens, New York.

He died on February 8, 2010.

== See also ==
- Touro University
- Lander Institute, Jerusalem

== Bibliography ==
- Lander, Bernard (1954). Towards an Understanding of Juvenile Delinquency: A Study of 8,464 Cases of Juvenile Delinquency in Baltimore. Columbia University Studies in the Social Sciences, Columbia University (New York, NY). Vol. 578. AMS Press. ISBN 0404515789.
