= Touro University California =

Jewish health graduate school in Vallejo, California,

- Motto: "To Serve, To Lead, To Teach"
- Type: Private Graduate School
- Established: 1997
- Parent institution: Touro College and University System
- Accreditation: WSCUC
- Religious affiliation: Judaism
- President: Alan Kadish
- Faculty: 105 full-time, 87 part-time
- Students: 1,400
- Location: Vallejo, California, United States; 38.087°N 122.2643°W
- Campus: Midsize City, 44 acres (0.18 km^{2})
- Website: www.tu.edu
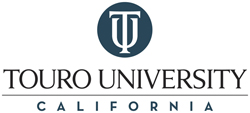

Touro University California is a private graduate school focused primarily on health professions and located on Mare Island in Vallejo, California. It is part of the Touro College and University System and is jointly administered with its sister campus Touro University Nevada.

The university was founded in 1997 and was established in San Francisco as an independent, Jewish-sponsored institution, but relocated to Vallejo. The university confers degrees in graduate studies of various disciplines including education, osteopathic medicine, pharmacy, physician assistant studies, nursing, and public health. The school's campus consists of 44 acres (18 ha) and 23 buildings of the former Mare Island naval base located east of the San Pablo Bay. Although sponsored by a Jewish organization, the school has a diverse student body of about 1,250 students as well as over 200 faculty members.

== History ==
Established in 1997, Touro University California was originally located in San Francisco with its inaugural class composed of 67 students. In 1999, officials decided to relocate to the southern area of Mare Island due to its large capacity and restored two naval quarters buildings originally built in the 1930s and had the lease option to renovate ten other buildings intended to become diagnostic and research laboratories. Touro University California's main buildings are Farragut Inn, named in honor of Commander David G. Farragut, Wilderman Hall in honor of Commander Alvin Wilderman, and Lander Hall named in honor of Dr. Bernard Lander, the founder of the Touro College system. After Western University of Health Sciences' College of Osteopathic Medicine of the Pacific received accreditation in 1982, Touro University California's College of Osteopathic Medicine became the second osteopathic medical school program to open in the state of California.

== Academics ==
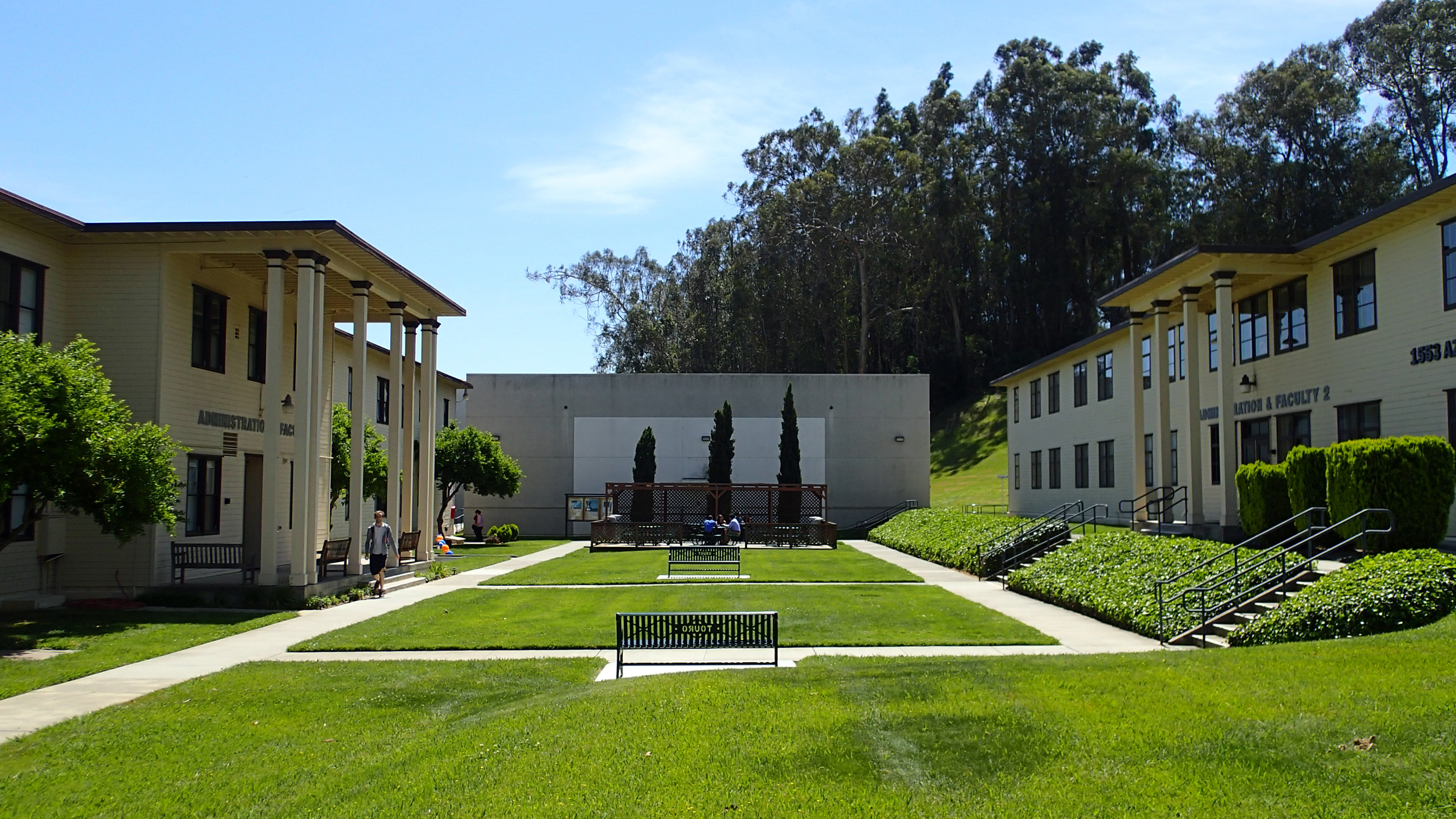
Touro University California, Mare Island, California - panoramio

The colleges of Touro University California include the College of Osteopathic Medicine which offers the Doctor of Osteopathic Medicine (D.O.) degree, the College of Pharmacy which offers the degree of Doctor of Pharmacy (Pharm.D.), the College of Education and Health Studies which offers three types of degrees, including a Master of Arts in Education, a Physician Assistant degree offered as a dual degree (MSPAS/MPH), and a Master of Public Health (MPH) degree. Additionally, students may pursue a dual degree such as D.O./MPH. Since 2010, Touro University California has offered the Master of Science in Medical Health Science degree (MSMHS) which provides specific training towards the preparation for the College of Osteopathic Medicine. In contrast, the Master of Science in Medical Health Sciences degree with emphasis on research in pharmaceutical sciences is offered with the aim of preparing students for the College of Pharmacy. Tuition for full-time students in 2012 was $43,090. The World Directory of Medical Schools lists the College of Osteopathic Medicine as a US medical school along with other accredited US M.D. and D.O. programs.

== Research ==
Faculty members of Touro University California's Colleges of Osteopathic Medicine and Pharmacy specialize in a wide range of basic and applied research in fields including: aging, anatomy and clinical imaging, cognitive aging, diabetes, immunology, infectious diseases, ion channels, longevity, neuroscience, metabolism/nutrition, and vaccine research. Touro University California has established research partnerships with University of California, San Francisco; University of California, Davis; University of California, Berkeley; Hebrew University of Jerusalem; Showa University; and University of São Paulo.

== Accreditation ==
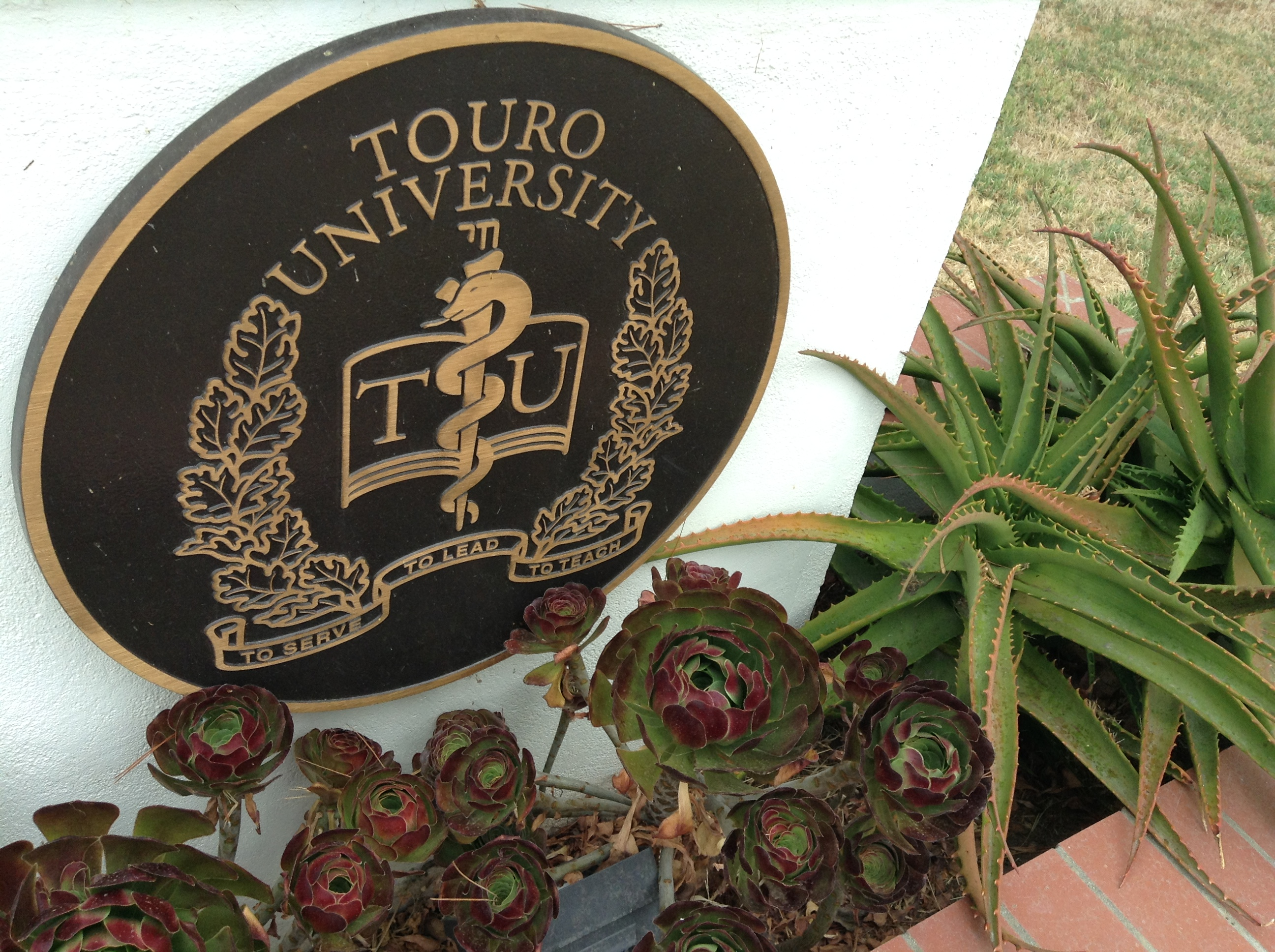
The Touro University seal surrounded by succulents on Mare Island

The university as a whole is accredited by the Accrediting Commissions for Senior Colleges and Universities of the Western Association of Schools and Colleges. Some colleges and programs at the university have additional accreditations from specialized accreditors:

College	Accreditation
College of Osteopathic Medicine	American Osteopathic Association's Commission on Osteopathic College Accreditation (COCA)
College of Pharmacy	Accreditation Council for Pharmacy Education (ACPE)
College of Education and Health Sciences	Accreditation Review Commission on Education for Physician Assistants Council on Education for Public Health; California Commission on Teacher Credentialing

== Student life ==
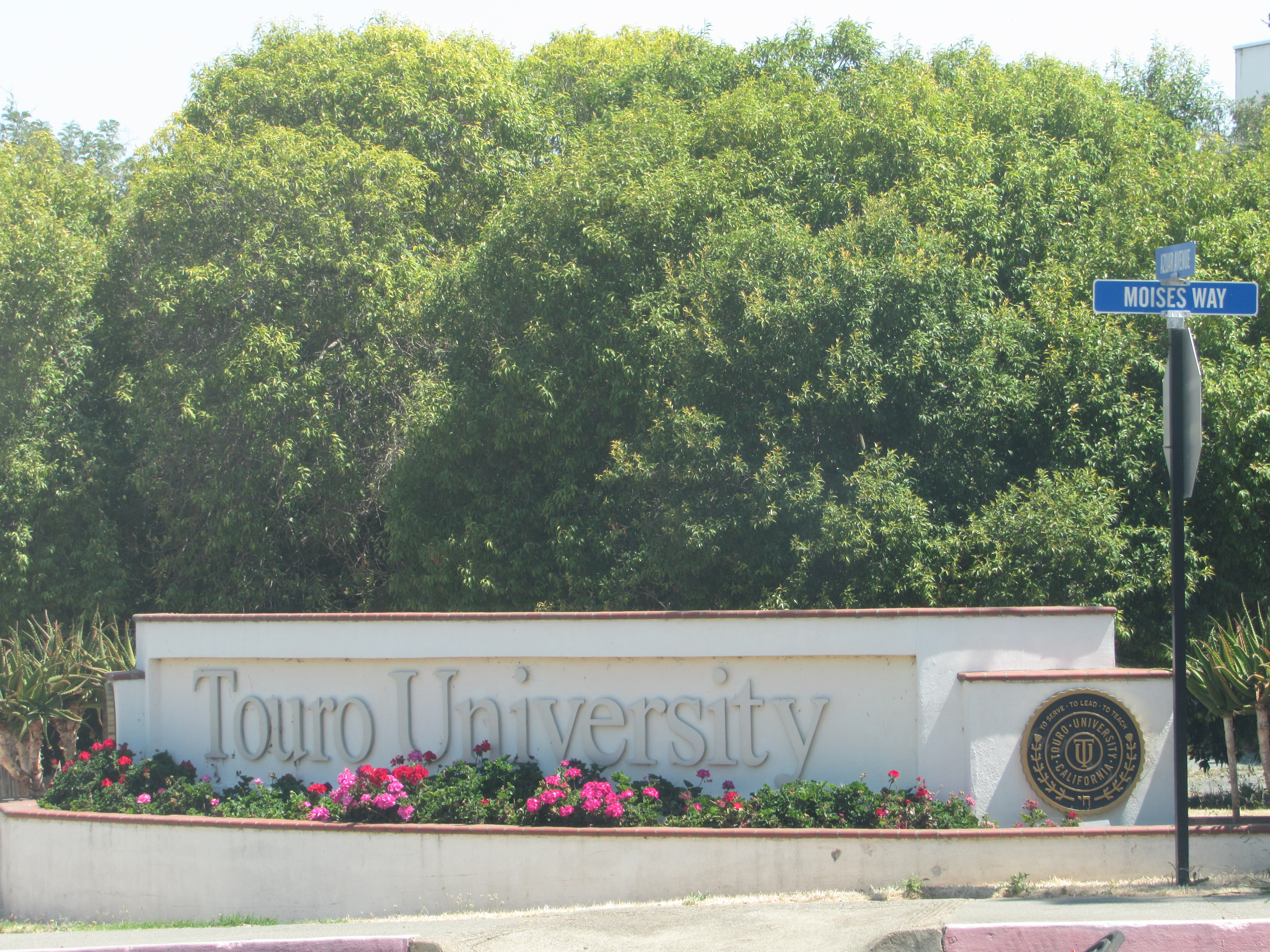
Touro University Sign on Mare Island in Vallejo, California

Touro University California also sponsors the Touro Student-Run Free Clinic, an interprofessional free clinic organized and staffed by student volunteers. The student-run free clinic was designed to improve access to healthcare for low-income Vallejo residents and to further improve the clinical skills of Touro University California students. A licensed clinician provides direct, on-site supervision. The College of Osteopathic Medicine hosts an active chapter of Sigma Sigma Phi, a national Osteopathic Medicine Honors Fraternity that emphasizes community service and scholastic achievement.

Each year, Touro University California hosts the Teen Life Conference to educate Vallejo high school students on matters of health with lectures, health screenings, informational booths, and interactive physical fitness activities to foster student participation.

== Notable faculty ==
- Walter Hartwig

== See also ==
- Medical schools in California
