= Touro University Nevada =

Private university in Henderson, Nevada, US

Coordinates: 36.043286°N 115.024017°W

- Motto: To Serve, To Lead, To Teach
- Type: Private university
- Established: 2004; 22 years ago
- Parent institution: Touro College and University System
- Accreditation: WSCUC
- Religious affiliation: Jewish
- Campus President and Provost: Andrew Priest
- Faculty: 60 full-time 112 part-time
- Students: 1,687
- Undergraduates: 40
- Postgraduates: 1,647
- Location: Henderson, Nevada, United States
- Campus: Urban
- Website: tun.touro.edu

Touro University Nevada (TUN) is a private university in Henderson, Nevada, United States. It is part of the Touro College and University System. Touro University Nevada is a branch campus of its sister campus Touro University California.

== History ==
Touro University Nevada was established to help address critical needs in health care and education, and as a resource for community service in Nevada. A non-profit, Jewish-sponsored, private institution affiliated with an international system of higher education, the university opened in 2004 with 78 medical students. Touro University Nevada is home to more than 1,300 students in a wide range of degree programs in osteopathic medicine, nursing, physical therapy, occupational therapy, physician assistant studies, camp administration and education. Many of these programs are the first of their kind in Nevada. The College of Osteopathic Medicine was Nevada's first osteopathic medical school and the state’s second medical school.

== Academics ==
TUN has two colleges:

- College of Health and Human Services
- College of Osteopathic Medicine

The College of Osteopathic Medicine is accredited by the American Osteopathic Association's Commission on Osteopathic College Accreditation (COCA). The World Directory of Medical Schools lists Touro as a medical school along with other accredited Doctor of Medicine and Doctor of Osteopathic Medicine programs. Touro University Nevada has also received accreditation from the Nevada Commission on Postsecondary Education, the American Physical Therapy Association's Commission on Accreditation in Physical Therapy Education, and the American Occupational Therapy Association.

=== Graduate medical education ===
Main entrance to Touro University Nevada in 2026.

Touro University Nevada is the academic sponsor of Valley Hospital’s graduate medical residency program, providing training opportunities for Touro students and post-graduate education for medical residents.

The program currently includes 16 traditional internships for first year trainees who will ultimately progress into other specialties. The largest single internal medicine residency program in the osteopathic medical profession with 45 slots. Other residency programs offered through Touro include residencies in family medicine, an orthopedic surgery, ophthalmology, dermatology, and neurology.

In 2017, the school received a $1.2 million state grant to fund a one-year geriatric medicine fellowship.

== Community resources ==
Center for Autism and Developmental Disabilities Developed to address a growing community need, Touro University Nevada’s Center for Autism and Developmental Disabilities is a multi-disciplinary, one-stop source for diagnostic services, therapy and supportive resources for families dealing with autism and other developmental disorders. This team approach affords individualized treatment programs based on each child’s individual needs. The center also serves as a learning laboratory for university students across the disciplines.

Active Aging Center In 2014, Touro opened its Active Aging Center to provide seniors additional healthcare services in addition to social and education programing.

Touro Health Center The university has also recently opened its first full-service patient clinic, staffed by practicing faculty members and open to the community. The medical clinic provides on-site learning opportunities for students, as well as a venue for future clinical research trials. An expanded patient clinic is planned for the next phase of the university’s build-out.

Physical Therapy Clinic Touro University Nevada opened a free physical therapy clinic run by TUN physical therapy students that are supervised by licensed physical therapy faculty.

== Research ==
Touro University Nevada faculty specialize in a wide range of basic and applied research in fields including: autism, cardiovascular physiology, cell biology, evolutionary biology, infectious diseases, neuroscience, osteopathic manipulative medicine, oncology, regenerative medicine, and women's health. Research conducted at Touro University Nevada has been funded by grants from the National Institute of Allergy and Infectious Diseases and the Schultz Engel Purpose Trust.

== Facilities ==
To accommodate growth and focus resources on academic needs, Touro University Nevada purchased two existing, flexible shell buildings within Henderson’s Black Mountain Business Parks. Touro University Nevada currently occupies 142,000 sq ft (13,200 m^{2}) the first building with classrooms and laboratories, offices, a university library, common spaces and clinics. The university will more than double its space with the next expansion of building one, adding 165,000 sq ft (15,300 m^{2}). Building two is currently occupied by rental tenants, and holds 200,000 sq ft (19,000 m^{2}) of space that the university may use for growth.

== See also ==
- List of medical schools in the United States
