= Touro University College of Medicine =

- Motto: Advancing health care through science, compassion and caring.
- Type: Private
- Active: April 16, 2007–2009
- Affiliations: Judaism
- Dean: Paul M. Wallach, M.D.
- Location: Hackensack, NJ, USA
- Website: touromed.touro.edu

Touro University College of Medicine was a proposed medical school to be based out of Hackensack, New Jersey. Its hospital affiliate was to be Hackensack University Medical Center (HUMC). The medical school disbanded in December 2009.

== Proposal and planning ==
The school was established on April 16, 2007, with Paul M. Wallach, M.D. named as its founding dean. The first proposed location of the school was on the campus of the former Pascack Valley Hospital (PVH) in Westwood, New Jersey, which had closed after declaring bankruptcy in November 2007. HUMC had acquired the PVH property on February 27, 2008, in an auction for $45 million in a joint bid with Touro.

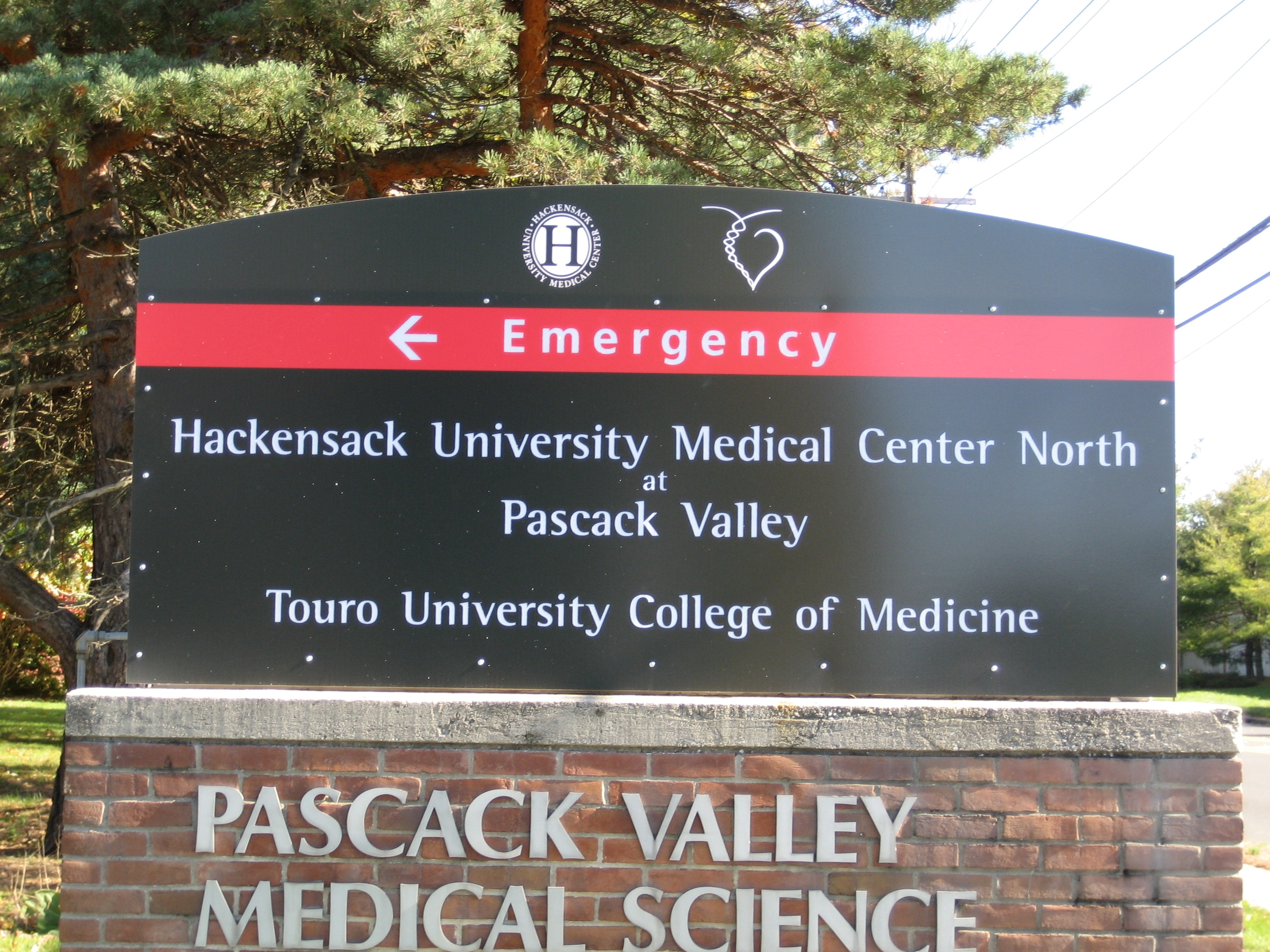

For the school to have become accredited and begin to admit students, it needed to undergo a site visit by the Liaison Committee on Medical Education (LCME). This was scheduled a year in advance for a visit in March 2008, but HUMC and Touro did not close on the newly purchased Pascack Valley Hospital property until April 30, 2008. As the LCME requires that potential medical schools own their property, the school could not have been accredited at that time. In September 2008, Touro backed out of their deal with HUMC, proposing instead to open their medical school in Hasbrouck Heights, while HUMC independently opened a satellite emergency department on the Westwood campus, called Hackensack University Medical Center North at Pascack Valley on October 1, 2008.

== Abandonment of proposal ==
On December 22, 2009 Touro College and University System announced it had abandoned its plan for the new school choosing instead to purchase the New York Medical College, in Valhalla, New York, for $60 million.

== See also ==
- Touro University California, a Touro University medical school located in California.
- Touro University Nevada, a Touro University medical school located in Nevada.
- Touro College of Osteopathic Medicine, a Touro University osteopathic medical school located in New York City.
