= Jarl Jensen =

Danish-American engineer

- Born: July 22, 1971 (age 55); Westwood, New Jersey, U.S.
- Education: Boston University
- Occupations: Inventor; Engineer
- Years active: 1996–present

Jarl Jensen (born July 22, 1971) is a Danish-American engineer. He specializes in areas such as 3D design and medical devices.

Jensen's research has resulted in several patented medical devices.

Jensen is also known for writing several books relating to U.S. politics and economy.

== Early life and education ==
Jensen was born on July 22, 1971, in Westwood, New Jersey. He graduated from Boston University, where he obtained a bachelor's degree in mechanical engineering.

== Career ==
Upon graduation, Jensen worked for EuroMed, where he led the company and also focused on research and development. He also started Inventagon in 2007.

== Research ==
Jensen has done research on and received patents for several inventions, including wound dressings, retail boxes, among others.

== Books ==
Jensen has written several books relating to on economics, politics, and current events.

- Optimizing America (2017)
- Showdown in the Economy of Good and Evil (2018)
- America's History of Empowering Wealth: Understanding the Consequence of Money Controlling Political Power (Optimizing America Booklets) (2018)
- Hacking The American Economy: Changing the role of monetary policy (Optimizing America Booklets) (2018)
- The Big Solution: Stopping the Doomsday Machine (2021)
