= Joseph M. Sanzari Children's Hospital =

Joseph M Sanzari Children's Hospital
- Hackensack Meridian Health

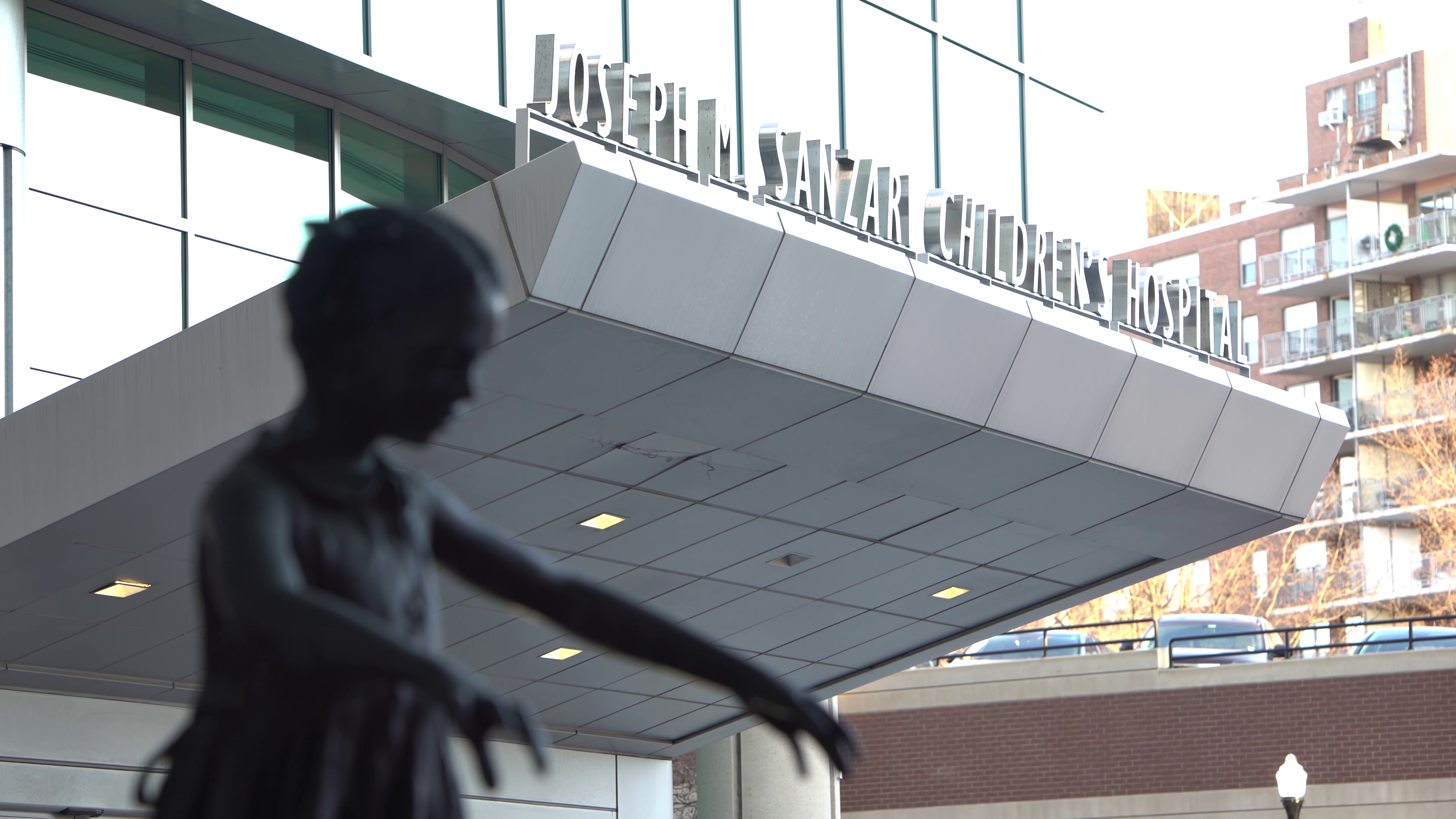
- The front entrance of the Joseph M. Sanzari Children's Hospital.

Geography
- Location: 30 Prospect Avenue, Hackensack, New Jersey, United States
- Coordinates: 40.884716°N 74.056052°W

Organization
- Type: Pediatric
- Affiliated university: Hackensack Meridian School of Medicine
- Network: Hackensack Meridian Health

Services
- Emergency department: Level II Pediatric Trauma Center
- Beds: 105

Helipads
- Helipad: FAA LID: NJ22 (shared with HUMC)

History
- Former name: The Children's Hospital at Hackensack University Medical Center
- Constructed: June 2002
- Opened: March 2006

Links
- Website: http://kids.hackensackumc.org
- Lists: Hospitals in New Jersey

The Joseph M. Sanzari Children's Hospital (JMSCH) at Hackensack University Medical Center is a pediatric acute care hospital with 105 beds. It is a designated New Jersey children's hospital and full institutional member of the National Association of Children's Hospitals.

It is affiliated with the Hackensack Meridian School of Medicine, Rutgers University New Jersey Medical School, University of Medicine and Dentistry of New Jersey-New Jersey Medical School in Newark, and is a member of the Hackensack Meridian Health system. JMSCH provides comprehensive pediatric specialties and sub-specialties for infants, children, teens, and young adults aged 0–22 throughout Northern New Jersey.

== About ==
=== Patient care units ===
The hospital has a variety of patient care units to provide services for infants, children, teens, and young adults in all conditions.

- 15-bed Pediatric Intensive Care Unit (PICU)
- 40-bed, Level III Neonatal Intensive Care Unit (NICU)
- 16-bed inpatient pediatric oncology unit
- 6-bed Pediatric Epilepsy Monitoring Unit
- 28-bed general inpatient pediatric unit

=== Services ===
The hospital has a comprehensive list of pediatric specialties and subspecialties including adolescent medicine, audiology, cardiology, dermatology, developmental medicine, endocrinology, emergency services, gastroenterology, genetics, hematology, nephrology, neurology, oncology, orthopedics, otolaryngology, pulmonology, rheumatology, and urology.

The hospital is the only hospital in New Jersey that offers pediatric blood and marrow transplantation.

== Awards ==
The Joseph M. Sanzari Children's Hospital received a Top 50 national ranking in Pediatric Neurology and Neurosurgery in U.S. News & World Report’s 2017–18 Best Children’s Hospitals.

In 2019, 2020, and 2021 the hospital was listed as the number one children's hospital in New Jersey by U.S. News & World Report.

In 2020, The Joseph M. Sanzari Children's Hospital ranked 44 nationally in pediatric oncology. It ranked 49 nationally in the field of Pediatric Neurology & Neurosurgery by the U.S. News & World Report.

The hospital is also accredited by the ANCC as a nurse magnet hospital because of its commitment to the advancement of nursing.

== History ==
Before constructing the new women's and children's pavilion, pediatrics at Hackensack University Medical Center were conducted on the second, third, and sixth floors of the Conklin building.

The Sarkis and Siran Gabrellian Women's and Children's Pavilion, where Sanzari Children's Hospital is housed, was opened in 2006. The pavilion houses both the Joseph M. Sanzari Children's Hospital and the Donna A. Sanzari Women's Hospital. The design of the building allows women who recently gave birth to have their baby treated in the same building. The entire pavilion contains 192 beds, while 105 are dedicated for pediatrics. The pavilion has won awards due to its innovative environmental hospital designs.

== See also ==
- List of children's hospitals in the United States
- Hackensack University Medical Center
- K. Hovnanian Children's Hospital
- Jersey Shore University Medical Center
