= PWH =

PWH may refer to:

- Pee-wee Herman, a comic fictional character created and portrayed by Paul Reubens
- Prince of Wales Hospital, a hospital in Shatin, Hong Kong
- Prince of Wales Hospital (Sydney), New South Wales, Australia
- Petawatt-hour (PWh), unit of power
- People With HIV, term associated with HIV/AIDS empowerment

== See also ==
- PVH
- PWHL
