= Jason Knapp =

Jason Knapp may refer to:

- Jason Knapp (baseball), baseball pitcher
- Jason Knapp (sportscaster), American sportscaster
