= Pascack Valley =

Valley in New Jersey, United States

Coordinates: 41.022°N 74.053°W

The Pascack Valley is the name for a region of New Jersey, United States, contained within Bergen County. It is named for the Pascack Brook. The region consists of eight municipalities: Montvale, Park Ridge, Woodcliff Lake, Hillsdale, Westwood, River Vale, Washington Township, and Emerson. The neighboring municipalities of Old Tappan and Oradell are sometimes considered to be part of the Pascack Valley, as both boroughs are included in the Greater Pascack Valley Chamber of Commerce.

== Entities named after the valley ==
- Pascack Valley Regional High School District serving students from Hillsdale, Montvale, River Vale and Woodcliff Lake. It operates two schools:
  - Pascack Valley High School, Hillsdale
  - Pascack Hills High School, Montvale
- Pascack Valley Line, operated by New Jersey Transit, offers service to Hoboken, New Jersey, and to New York City via the Secaucus Junction
- Pascack Valley Hospital, former hospital in Westwood, now re-opened as the Hackensack University Medical Center at Pascack Valley
- Hackensack University Medical Center at Pascack Valley, Westwood
- Pascack Valley Community Life, weekly newspaper
- Greater Pascack Valley Chamber of Commerce website
- Pascack Historical Society, Park Ridge

== See also ==
- The Pascack Valley Line: A History of the New Jersey and New York Railroad ISBN 0-941652-14-9
