= Carlos Carrasco (baseball) =

Venezuelan-American baseball player (born 1987)

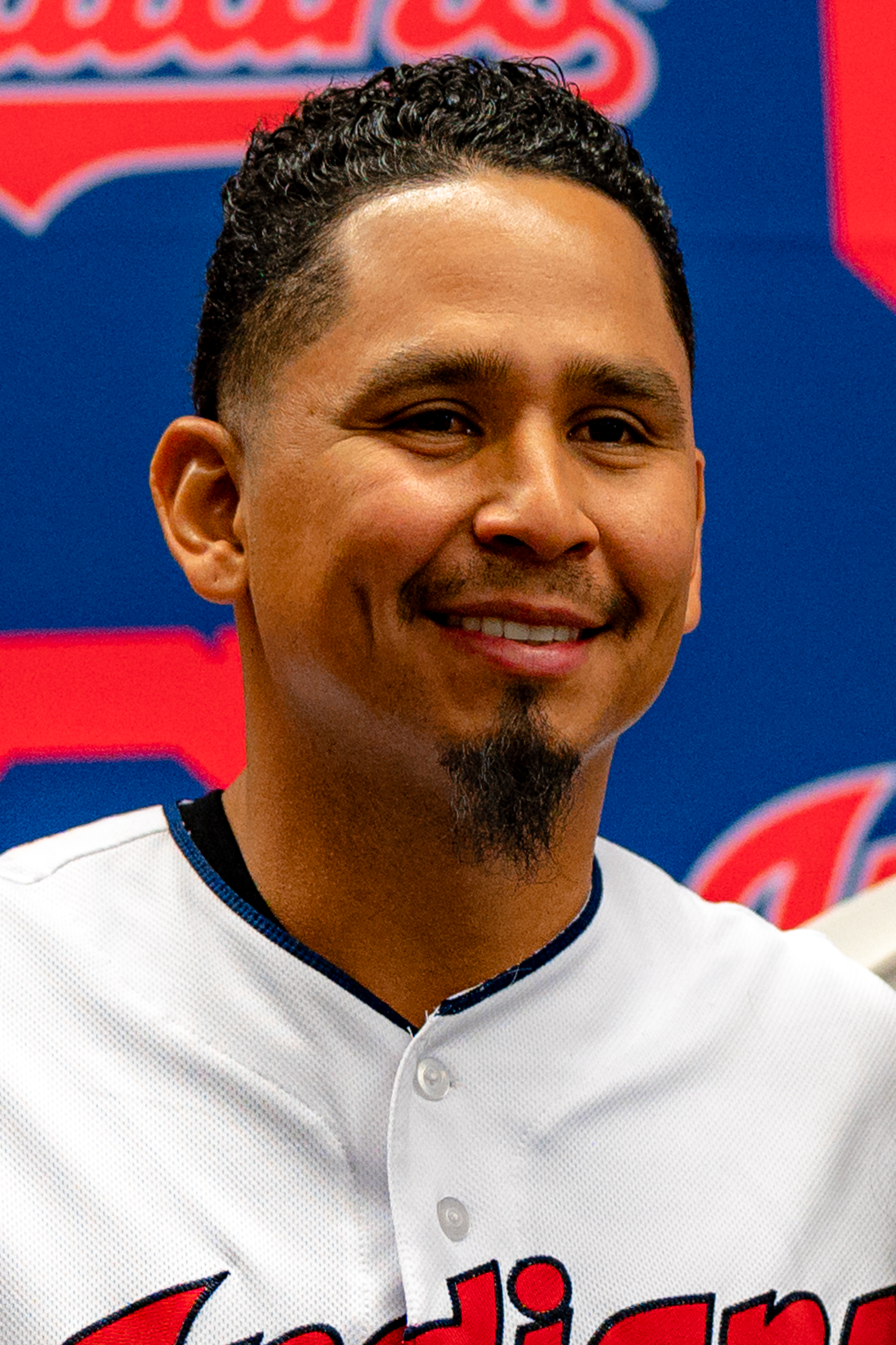
- Carrasco with the Cleveland Indians in 2020

LG Twins – No. 59
- Pitcher
- Born: March 21, 1987 (age 39); Barquisimeto, Venezuela
- Bats: Right Throws: Right

Professional debut
- MLB: September 1, 2009, for the Cleveland Indians
- KBO: July 31, 2026, for the LG Twins

MLB statistics (through July 5, 2026)
- Win–loss record: 112–105
- Earned run average: 4.24
- Strikeouts: 1,703

KBO statistics (through August 21, 2026)
- Win–loss record: 1-1
- Earned run average: 3.44
- Strikeouts: 15
- Stats at Baseball Reference

Teams
- Cleveland Indians (2009–2011, 2013–2020); New York Mets (2021–2023); Cleveland Guardians (2024); New York Yankees (2025); Atlanta Braves (2025–2026); LG Twins (2026–present)

Career highlights and awards
- AL Comeback Player of the Year (2019); Roberto Clemente Award (2019); AL wins leader (2017)

Carlos Luis Carrasco (born March 21, 1987), nicknamed "Cookie", is a Venezuelan-American professional baseball pitcher for the LG Twins of the KBO League. He has previously played in Major League Baseball (MLB) for the Cleveland Indians / Guardians, New York Mets, New York Yankees, and Atlanta Braves. Listed at 6 feet 4 inches (1.93 m) and 224 pounds (102 kg), he throws and bats right-handed.

== Early life ==
Carrasco was born in 1987 in Barquisimeto, Venezuela. By age 10 he was playing baseball, initially as a third baseman. He was discovered by a baseball scout in Venezuela at age 16, and threw for Sal Agostinelli, international scouting director for the Philadelphia Phillies, demonstrating a 91 mph (146 km/h) fastball. At a young age, Carrasco learned to throw left-handed, in addition to his natural right-handed delivery, but he does not consider himself ambidextrous.

== Career ==
=== Philadelphia Phillies ===
Carrasco was signed by the Phillies as an undrafted free agent on November 25, 2003. In 2006, Carrasco spent the entire season at the Single-A level with the Lakewood BlueClaws, compiling a 2.26 earned run average (ERA) in 159 1/3 innings pitched. He split time in 2007 between the Single-A Clearwater Threshers and the Double-A Reading Phillies. Carrasco compiled a 2.84 ERA in 69 2/3 innings pitched at Clearwater and a 4.86 ERA in 70 1/3 innings pitched with Reading. Carrasco threw his first no-hitter on August 21, 2007. He was on the World roster of the 2006, 2007, and 2008 All-Star Futures Games.

Entering the 2007 season, Carrasco was ranked as the top prospect in the Phillies organization and the 41st-best prospect in baseball. He was still ranked as the top prospect in the Phillies system entering 2008, and was listed as having the organization's best fastball and changeup.

=== Cleveland Indians ===
On July 29, 2009, the Phillies traded Carrasco, along with Jason Donald, Lou Marson, and Jason Knapp to the Cleveland Indians for Cliff Lee and Ben Francisco. Carrasco made his major league debut on September 1. In five starts with the Indians, he had a 0–4 record with 8.87 ERA. During the 2010 season, Carrasco had a 2–2 record and 3.83 ERA in seven starts for Cleveland.

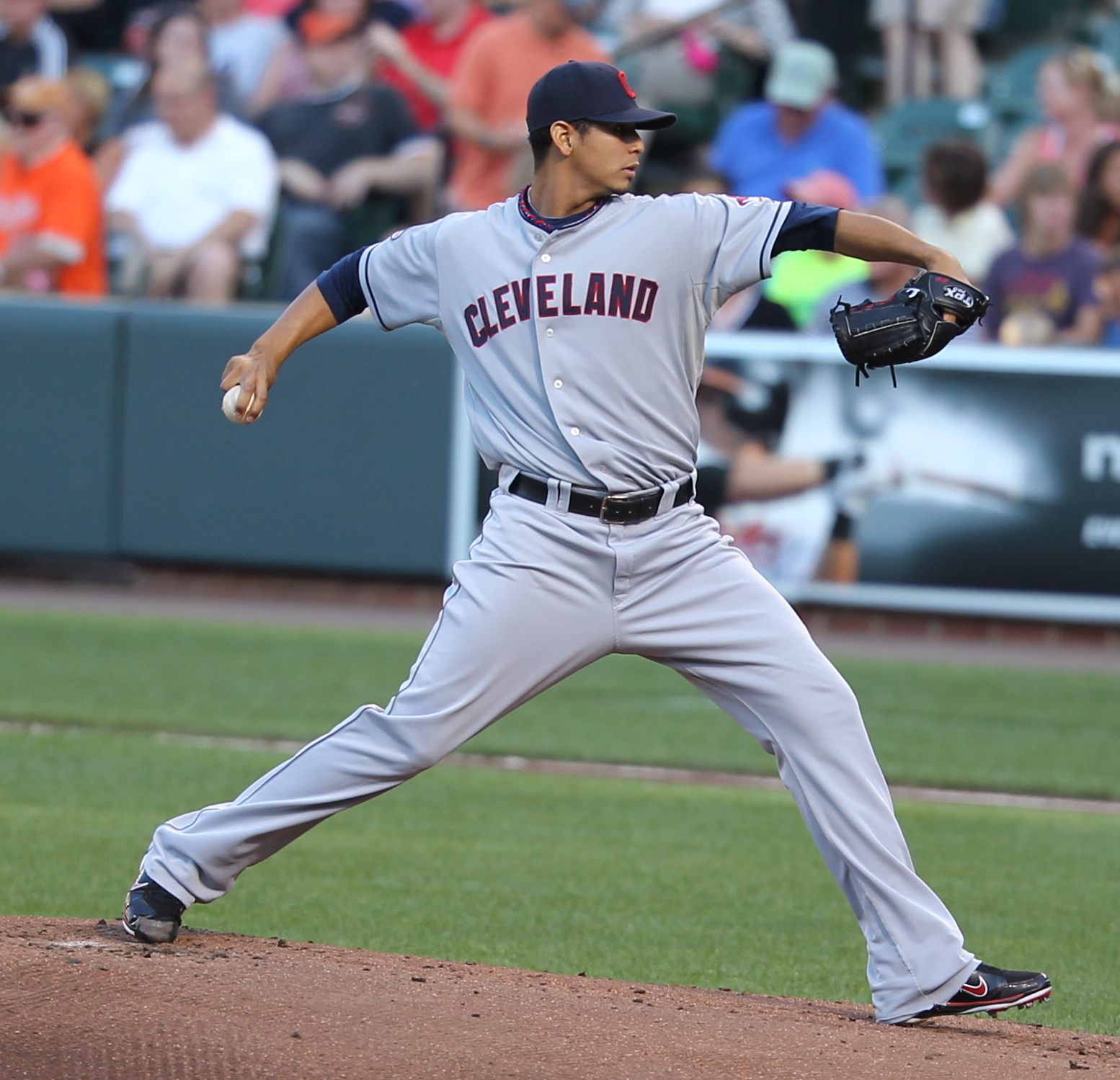
Carrasco with the Indians in 2011

On July 29, 2011, against the Kansas City Royals, Carrasco surrendered a season-high 7 runs over 3 1/3 innings highlighted by a grand slam by outfielder Melky Cabrera. Carrasco took out his frustration by throwing a pitch at the head of Royals' designated hitter Billy Butler. This resulted in his immediate ejection by home plate umpire Scott Barry. Because of this action, MLB suspended Carrasco for 6 games and levied an undisclosed fine. According to Carrasco, the pitch was not intentional, but he was upset because Cabrera had admired his homer. Carrasco made 21 starts for Cleveland, pitching to an 8–9 record with 4.62 ERA and striking out 86 batters in 124 2/3 innings. In September 2011, Carrasco underwent Tommy John surgery and eventually missed the entire 2012 season as a result.

On April 9, 2013, Carrasco made his first start since his Tommy John surgery and suspension. His season began with a rather poor outing against the New York Yankees during which he surrendered seven runs in 3 2/3 innings. After giving up a 2-run homer to Robinson Canó, on the next pitch Carrasco hit batter Kevin Youkilis with a pitch that was "high and inside". This resulted in Carrasco's ejection by home plate umpire Jordan Baker. MLB eventually suspended Carrasco eight games and fined him $5,000 for "intentionally throwing" at Youkilis. This punishment appeared to take into account Carrasco's history and past actions. After the game, Indians manager Terry Francona said that Carrasco's actions "didn't look good." Carrasco's pitch near the head of Youkilis was "nearly identical" to the one with Cabrera the season before. On the next day, Carrasco was optioned to the Triple-A Columbus Clippers. He was recalled to the majors on June 8, and then sent back down to Triple-A on June 24. He was recalled on July 6, and then designated for assignment on July 7. Carrasco was then optioned to Columbus on July 9. His record for the 2013 season with Cleveland was 1–4 with a 6.75 ERA.

For the 2014 season, Carrasco appeared in 40 games for Cleveland (14 starts) and had an 8–7 record with 2.55 ERA while striking out 140 batters in 134 innings.

On April 7, 2015, Carrasco signed a 4-year extension worth $22 million that also includes club options for 2019 and 2020. During a game against the Chicago White Sox on April 14, Carrasco was struck in the face by a line drive off the bat of Melky Cabrera. He left the game as he was carted off on a motor stretcher. Carrasco had a bruise on his jaw while X-rays were negative. On July 1, Carrasco took a no-hitter into the ninth inning against the Tampa Bay Rays, only to surrender a two-out, two-strike single to Joey Butler before retiring the side. It would have been the first no-hitter by an Indians pitcher since Len Barker's perfect game on May 15, 1981. On July 19, Carrasco hit the first single of his major league career against the Cincinnati Reds' Johnny Cueto in the top of the second inning. Carrasco went six innings giving up four hits and one earned run with a no decision. In 30 starts during the 2015 season, Carrasco compiled a 14–12 record with a 3.63 ERA, and struck out 216 batters in 183 2/3 innings.

Carrasco made two trips to the disabled list in 2016, the second of which resulted from a line drive to his right hand on September 17 that fractured the fifth metacarpal bone. This injury forced Carrasco to miss the entire postseason. Carrasco finished the 2016 season with an 11–8 record and 3.32 ERA in 25 starts, recording 150 strikeouts in 146 1/3 innings.

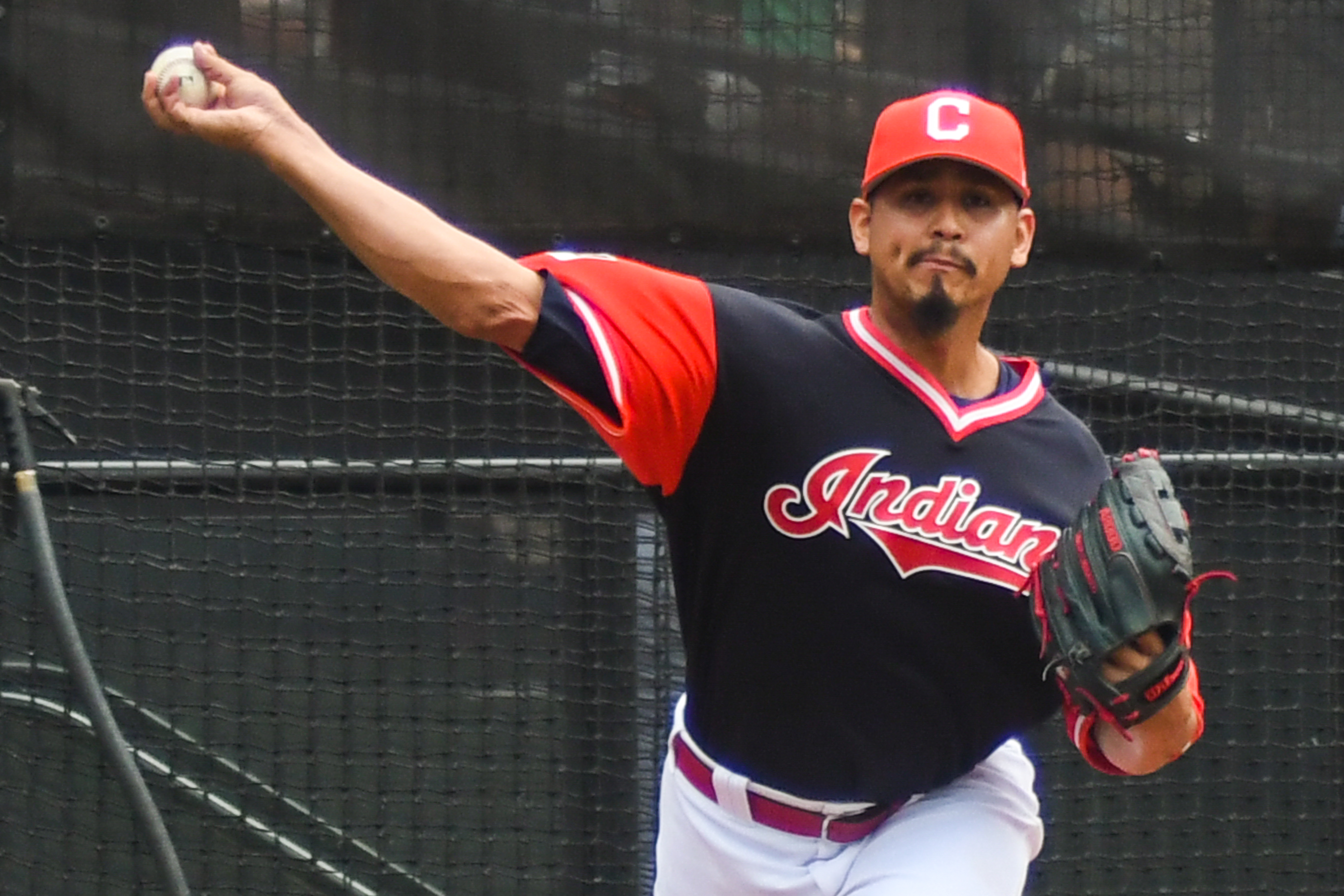
Carrasco with the Indians in 2017

In the fifth inning of a July 7, 2017 game against the Detroit Tigers, Carrasco pitched an immaculate inning, striking out the side on the minimum nine pitches. He became only the second pitcher in Indians history to do so, following Justin Masterson in 2014, and the 84th in Major League history. Carrasco struck out 14 Minnesota Twins batters on September 28, in a 5–2 game to give Cleveland their 100th win of the season. For the 2017 season, Carrasco was 18–6 with a 3.29 ERA, striking out 226 batters in 200 innings.

During 2018, Carrasco struck out 231 batters in 192 innings, pitching to a record of 17–10 with a 3.38 ERA. On December 6, 2018, Carrasco signed a four-year contract extension through the 2022 season with a club option for the 2023 season.

On June 5, 2019, Carrasco was placed on the 10-day injured list, with the team stating that he had been "diagnosed with a blood condition." He subsequently spent the remainder of June on the injured list. On July 6, Carrasco revealed that he had been diagnosed with chronic myelogenous leukemia, a treatable form of leukemia. On August 28, Carrasco was activated from the IL. On September 1, he made his first appearance since his diagnosis, pitching an inning in relief against the Tampa Bay Rays. In 2019, Carrasco made 12 starts for the Indians, posting a 6–7 record, a 5.29 ERA, and 96 strikeouts across 80 innings pitched. After the season, he was named the 2019 AL Comeback Player of the Year.

With the 2020 Cleveland Indians, Carrasco appeared in 12 games, compiling a 3–4 record with 2.91 ERA and 82 strikeouts in 68 innings pitched.

=== New York Mets ===
On January 7, 2021, the Indians traded Carrasco and Francisco Lindor to the New York Mets for Amed Rosario, Andrés Giménez, Josh Wolf, and Isaiah Greene. During spring training, Carrasco tore his hamstring during a running drill and was expected be out for 6–8 weeks. As of late April, he was expected to join the Mets rotation in the second week of May. On May 6, Carrasco was placed on the 60-day injured list as he continued to recover from the injury.

He was activated by the Mets in late July, and made his first appearance with the team on July 30, receiving a no decision in a start against the Cincinnati Reds. The first pitch Carrasco threw for the Mets was hit for a home run by Jonathan India. Carrasco's first season with the Mets was described as "discouraging" and "frustrating." He made 12 starts for the Mets in 2021, posting a 1–5 record, a 6.04 ERA, and 50 strikeouts across 53^{2}/_{3} innings pitched.

After the season, Carrasco revealed that he had been pitching with a bone fragment in his elbow which was repaired with a surgery in October. Carrasco began the 2022 season with a 4–1 record in his first eight appearances for the Mets. On July 30, 2022, he earned his 100th career win after a 4–0 shutout against the Miami Marlins. Carrasco made 29 starts for the Mets in 2022, posting a 15–7 record, a 3.97 ERA, and 152 strikeouts across 152 innings pitched.

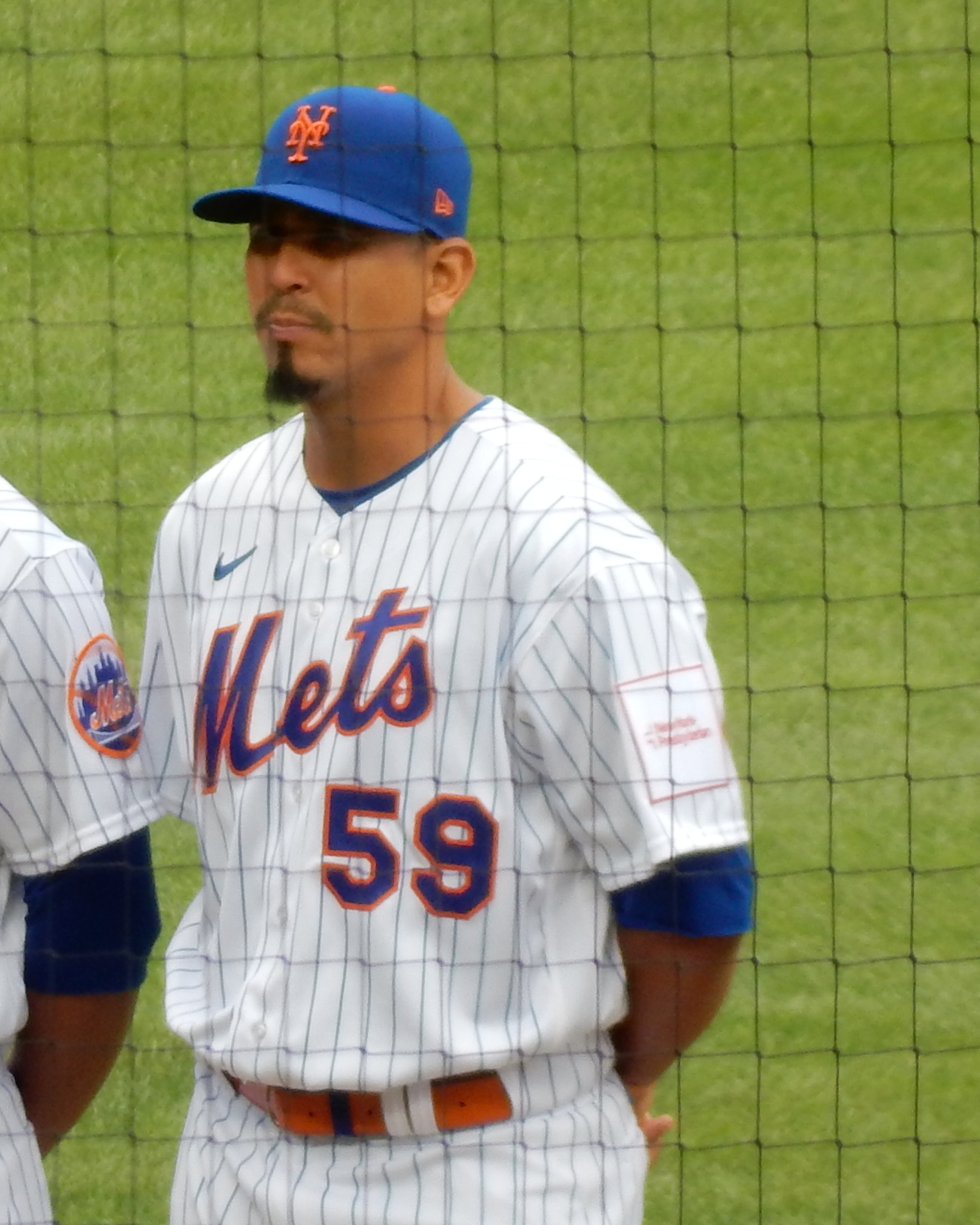
Carrasco with the Mets in 2023

On November 10, 2022, the Mets exercised Carrasco's $14 million option for the 2023 season. On August 29, 2023, he was placed on waivers by the Mets, but was not claimed and remained with the club. Carrasco made 20 starts for the Mets in 2023, posting a 3–8 record, a 6.80 ERA, and 66 strikeouts in 90 innings pitched. He became a free agent following the season.

=== Cleveland Guardians (second stint) ===
On February 1, 2024, Carrasco signed a minor league contract with the Cleveland Guardians. On March 22, it was announced that Carrasco had made Cleveland's Opening Day roster. The Guardians selected Carrasco's contract on March 28. In 21 starts for Cleveland, he compiled a 3–10 record and 5.64 ERA with 89 strikeouts over 103 2/3 innings pitched. On September 17, Carrasco was designated for assignment by the Guardians. After clearing waivers, he was outrighted to the Triple-A Columbus Clippers on September 20. Carrasco elected minor league free agency on October 21.

=== New York Yankees ===
On February 3, 2025, Carrasco signed a minor league contract with the New York Yankees. On March 22, the Yankees selected Carrasco's contract after he made the team's Opening Day roster. Carrasco made his Yankees debut on March 29; he pitched two innings, allowed five hits, three runs and striking out two batters as he got a no-decision against the Milwaukee Brewers. On April 3, he got his first win as a Yankee pitcher against the Arizona Diamondbacks. In that game, he pitched 5 1/3 innings, allowed five hits and three runs, walked two batters, and struck out five batters as the winning pitcher in a 9–7 victory over the Diamondbacks. In 8 appearances (6 starts) for the Yankees, Carrasco posted a 2–2 record and 5.91 ERA with 25 strikeouts over 32 innings of work. He was designated for assignment by New York on May 6. Carrasco cleared waivers and was sent outright to the Triple-A Scranton/Wilkes-Barre RailRiders on May 8. On June 1, the Yankees added Carrasco back to their active roster. He did not appear in a game before he was designated for assignment on June 3. Carrasco cleared waivers and was sent outright to Scranton the following day.

=== Atlanta Braves ===
On July 28, 2025, the Yankees traded Carrasco to the Atlanta Braves in exchange for cash considerations. In three starts for the Braves, he struggled to a 9.88 ERA with nine strikeouts across 13 2/3 innings pitched. On August 14, Carrasco was designated for assignment by Atlanta. He elected free agency on August 16. The next day, Carrasco re-signed with Atlanta on a minor league contract.

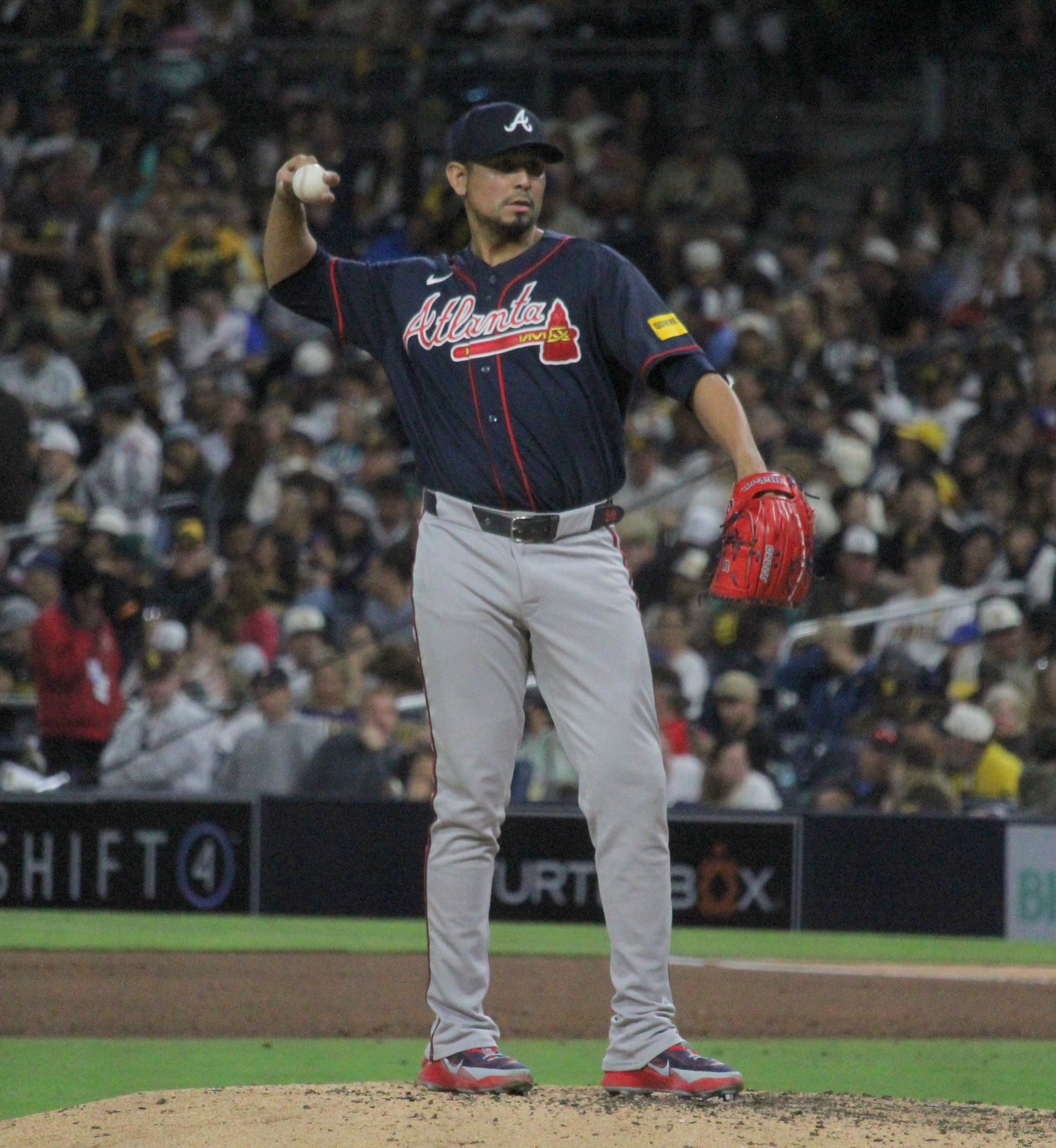
Carrasco with the Braves in 2026

On November 8, 2025, Carrasco re-signed with the Braves on a new minor league contract. On April 23, 2026, his contract was selected by the Braves. On April 29, Carrasco was designated for assignment by Atlanta after one scoreless relief appearance. He cleared waivers and elected free agency on May 1. The following day, Carrasco re-signed with the Braves and was selected to the major league roster. After pitching 1 1/3 innings in relief against the Seattle Mariners in his only appearance, Carrasco was designated for assignment again on May 5. He elected free agency after clearing waivers two days later. On May 8, Carrasco re-signed with Atlanta on a minor league contract. On May 21, the Braves added Carrasco back to their active roster. On May 29, he was designated for assignment by Atlanta after two relief appearances. Carrasco cleared waivers and elected free agency on June 1. The following day, he re-signed with Atlanta and was selected to the active roster. Carrasco was designated for assignment by Atlanta for a fourth time on June 10. He returned to Gwinnett after clearing outright waivers on June 12. On June 17, Carrasco was selected to the active roster. Carrasco allowed three earned runs in 5 2/3 innings spanning two appearances, and was designated for assignment once more on June 24. He elected free agency after clearing waivers two days later. Carrasco re-joined the organization on another minor league contract on June 27. On July 5, he was selected to the active roster. After allowing five earned runs in relief later that day, Carrasco was designated for assignment on July 6 for the sixth time during the 2026 season; he cleared waivers and elected free agency two days later. On July 9, Carrasco re-signed with the Braves on another minor league contract. He was released on July 21.

=== LG Twins ===
On July 22, 2026, Carrasco signed with the LG Twins of the KBO League.

== Personal life ==
Carrasco shared in a Players' Tribune article some rather unusual experiences during his early time in the United States. In his first spring training, he ate Domino's Pizza every day for 90 consecutive days, because "it was the only thing I knew how to order." Domino's awarded him one month of free pizza for being their "best customer." He added, he did little outside of baseball in his first few years in the U.S., including not speaking with his teammates. "Not because I didn't want to, but because I didn't know how." After being traded to the Indians, he dedicated his efforts to learning English. In August 2016, he became a US citizen.

Carrasco has five children with his wife, Karelis. In 2010, he and his daughter Camila, then four years old, visited children at a hospital, which inspired Camila to start to cut her hair with scissors to give to the cancer patients.

Carrasco is heavily involved in community development and charity work; he has donated hundreds of thousands of dollars, time, and supplies to organizations located in his native Venezuela along with Colombia, the United States, Africa, and more. He was the 2019 recipient of the Roberto Clemente Award, given annually to an MLB player who "best exemplifies the game of baseball, sportsmanship, community involvement and the individual's contribution to his team."

Carrasco is also a leukemia survivor.

== See also ==
- List of Major League Baseball pitchers who have thrown an immaculate inning
- List of Major League Baseball players from Venezuela
