= Graig Kreindler =

American painter

- Born: April 17, 1980 (age 46); Westwood, New Jersey, U.S.
- Education: School of Visual Arts (B.F.A.); Lehman College (M.A.)
- Known for: Painting; Illustration
- Spouse: Sarvenaz Tash
- Children: 2
- Website: graigkreindler.com

Graig Kreindler (born April 17, 1980) is an American painter and illustrator. He is best known for his oil paintings depicting vintage, historical baseball scenes as well as his portraits of baseball players, both past and present.

== Early life and education ==
Born in Westwood, New Jersey to a Jewish family, Kreindler grew up in Rockland County, New York.

His relationship with baseball began at a very early age: his parents named him after former Yankee third baseman, Graig Nettles, and took him to his first baseball game before the age of one. His father was an avid collector of baseball cards since childhood while his mother grew up attending Brooklyn Dodger games with her family. Kreindler became fascinated with his family's history with the sport and has said, to him, "no other sport embodies the relationship between generations and the sense of community like baseball."

Kreindler attended the School of Visual Arts in New York City, where he received a Bachelor of Fine Arts in Illustration in 2002. He also holds a Master in Art Education from Lehman College.

== Career ==
Kreindler's sports work has garnered him many awards, including the Norman Rockwell Museum Award and Illustration Academy Award from the Society of Illustrators, and has been featured in nationally distributed books, newspapers and magazines. He has original works hanging in many baseball and sports museums, notably: the Yogi Berra Museum and Learning Center, the Jackie Robinson Museum, the Negro Leagues Baseball Museum, and the National Jewish Sports Hall of Fame and Museum.

In order to depict his many images of baseball scenes from the early twentieth century, which are often sourced from black-and-white photographs, Kreindler does painstaking research to verify details like the colors of ballpark advertisements, uniform styles or the weather conditions at a particular game.

He has said, "I act as a visual historian: recreating a history that I have never experienced, yet, like millions of fans, maintain a profound connection with. Though the days of watching Joe DiMaggio in centerfield are over, I would like the vivid images and memories that were so much a part of the lives of an older generation to be released in their youthful energy and vitality through my artwork."

In 2012, the United States Postal Service issued a softbound book called Play Ball! which featured color reproductions of 12 of Kreindler's paintings.

== Personal life ==
Kreindler is married to author Sarvenaz Tash who was born in Tehran, Iran and grew up on Long Island, New York. The couple reside in Brooklyn, New York and have two children.
