= PVH =

PVH may refer to:

== Organisations ==
- PVH (company), an American clothing company
- Phoenix Venture Holdings, a British automotive company

== Places ==
- Pascack Valley Hospital, a hospital in Westwood, New Jersey, United States
- Poudre Valley Hospital, a hospital in Fort Collins, Colorado, United States
- Governador Jorge Teixeira de Oliveira International Airport (IATA code), in Porto Velho, Brazil

== Science and technology ==
- Paraventricular nucleus of hypothalamus, in anatomy
- Hardware virtual machine guests with paravirtualized drivers (PV-on-HVM or PVH), in the Xen hypervisor
