= Cunningham v. Cunningham =

- Court: New York Court of Appeals
- Full case name: Anna Cunningham by Anna Prell, her guardian ad litem v. William Cunningham
- Submitted: June 17, 1912
- Decided: October 22, 1912
- Citation: 99 N.E. 845, 206 N.Y. 341, 43 L.R.A. (n.s.) 355

Case history
- Procedural history: Complaint dismissed, Cunningham v. Cunningham, 128 N.Y.S. 104 (Sup. Ct. 1910); affirmed 130 N.Y.S. 1109 (App. Div. 1911) (memorandum opinion)

Court membership
- Judges sitting: Cullen, Willard Bartlett, Chase, Gray, Haight, Vann, Werner

Case opinions
- Majority: Haight, joined by Cullen, Vann, Willard Bartlett, Chase
- Dissent: Werner
- Gray took no part in the consideration or decision of the case.

Cunningham v. Cunningham, 99 N.E. 845 (N.Y. 1912), was a case heard by the New York Court of Appeals which allowed the annulment of a marriage that took place in New Jersey, where the bride had been below the age of consent in both states.

== Factual and procedural background ==
On January 30, 1910, Anna Prell (then 17) married William Cunningham (then around 40) in Westwood, New Jersey. Cunningham had been a boarder in the Prell family's Chelsea home. On that day, Cunningham and Prell had gone to City Hall seeking a marriage license. Because of Prell's age, New York law required evidence that her parents consented to the marriage. They then went to Westwood where a minister married them. The couple returned to the Prell home, keeping their marriage a secret, and continuing to live as they had previously. On Easter Sunday (March 27 that year), however, William returned to the Prell house intoxicated, and announced the marriage to Anna's parents. The police were called, and Anna's mother (also named Anna) was arrested for assault, and subsequently released. William was put out of the house, and Anna applied to the New York courts for an annulment.

In December 1910, the New York Supreme Court dismissed the petition. On appeal, the Appellate Division affirmed without opinion.

== Judgment ==
The Court of Appeals reversed, 5-1 in an opinion by Judge Haight, holding that even if the marriage was not voidable under the New Jersey statute, the contacts to New York (both parties were New York domiciliaries at all relevant times) and public policy of New York counseled the application of New York law, under which it was voidable. The court does suggest that the marriage was voidable under the New Jersey statute, though a January 1913 article in the Harvard Law Review questions this.

Judge Werner dissented, arguing that the law in New York for analyzing the validity of a marriage contract was to look at the lex loci contractus—the law where the contract was made—and that in the absence of explicit legislative authorization the court should not be annulling a valid New Jersey marriage.
