= Pascack Valley Medical Center =

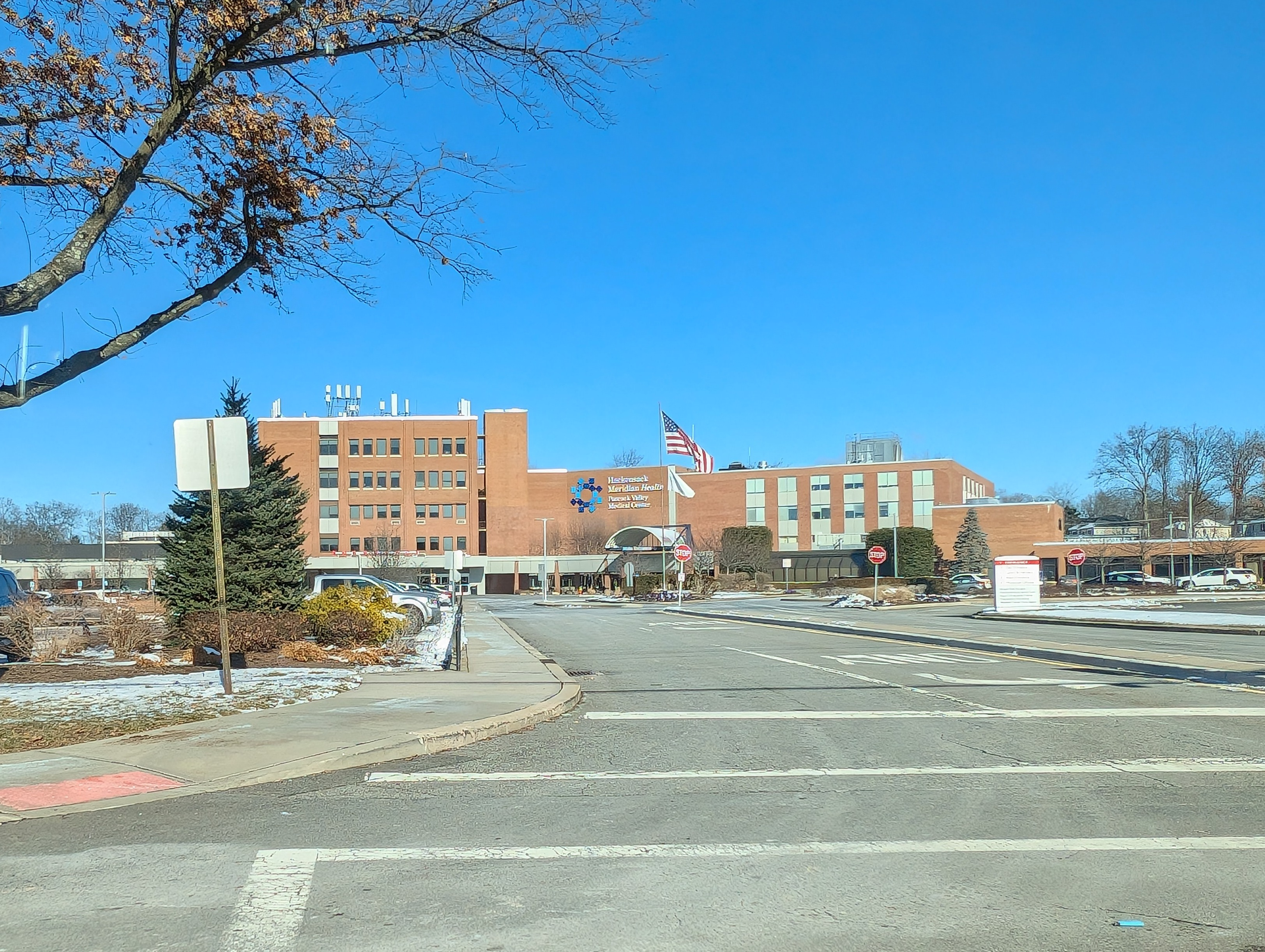

Geography
- Location: 250 Old Hook Road, Westwood, New Jersey, United States
- Coordinates: 40°59′6.75″N 74°0′54.95″W

Organization
- Care system: Medicare (US), Medicaid, Charity care
- Type: Full-service boutique hospital
- Affiliated university: Hackensack University Medical Center

Services
- Emergency department: Yes
- Beds: 128 (overnight)

History
- Opened: 2008

Links
- Website: http://www.hackensackumcpv.com/
- Lists: Hospitals in New Jersey

Pascack Valley Medical Center formerly known as Hackensack University Medical Center at Pascack Valley is a full-service boutique hospital located in Westwood, New Jersey, at the site of the former Pascack Valley Hospital. Owned 35% by Hackensack University Medical Center (HackensackUMC) and 65% by Ardent Health Services, HackensackUMC at Pascack Valley serves the Pascack Valley and Northern Valley communities in northern Bergen County. In 2021 it was given a grade A by the Leapfrog patient safety organization.

== History ==
In November 2006, HackensackUMC entered into a memorandum of understanding with Pascack Valley Hospital (PVH), located in Westwood, New Jersey, to acquire the hospital from Well Care Group, Inc. In 2007, Pascack Valley Hospital filed for Chapter 11 bankruptcy, leading to the closure of the 291-bed hospital. After the closure, the site was placed for auction by order of the bankruptcy court judge administering the case. The Touro University College of Medicine, which had plans to open a medical school on the site, had sought to advance the planned March 2008 bidding so that it could meet a requirement for preliminary accreditation. The medical school planned to bid together with Hackensack University Medical Center. The other bidders were, in a joint offer, Ridgewood's Valley Hospital and Englewood Hospital and Medical Center in which urgent care would be offered, but no overnight beds would be maintained. Paradigm Physician Partners planned to reopen the facility as a community hospital with 100 to 150 beds. In a fevered auction at the Newark, New Jersey, courtroom, the HackensackUMC–Touro Medical School joint bid of $45 million won the bidding, beating the Valley Hospital–Englewood Hospital effort in 23 rounds of bids; Paradigm Physician Partners and another prospective participant were disqualified from participation.

On October 1, 2008, Hackensack University Medical Center North at Pascack Valley opened as "a satellite emergency department to treat non-life-threatening emergencies" out of the old facility. The satellite hospital aimed to serve the local community for immediate healthcare needs and serviced the area until June 1, 2013.

In February 2012 the New Jersey Health Commissioner certified the application of HackensackUMC and Legacy Hospital Partners, Inc., of Texas (now Ardent Health Services), to reopen a fully functioning hospital in Westwood and serve the Pascack and Northern Valley communities. In June 2013, HackensackUMC at Pascack Valley was opened. HackensackUMC Pascack Valley is now a 128-bed facility that features an intensive/critical care unit, five operating rooms, one special procedure room, and a cardiac catheterization laboratory.

== Services and level of care ==
HackensackUMC at Pascack Valley is a full-service acute-care inpatient community hospital also providing radiology, women's health, same-day surgery, and a Level II Special Care Nursery staffed by Onsite Neonatal Partners. Current clinical services include:

- Cardiovascular
- Emergency
- ICU
- Neuroscience
- Orthopedic
- Radiology
- Rehabilitation
- Surgery
- Wound Care

== Acknowledgements ==
The 55th Annual New Good Neighbor Awards competition (New Jersey Business magazine) recognized HackensackUMC at Pascack Valley in 2014 for working to bring about an improved economy in New Jersey by building or renovating a commercial facility.

HackensackUMC at Pascack Valley has been named a finalist in the hospital of the year category in the 2014 NJBIZ awards program.

According to U.S. News & World Report, in 2021 it ranks among New Jersey's top 15 hospitals for maternity care.
