= Hackensack University Medical Center =

- Hackensack Meridian Health

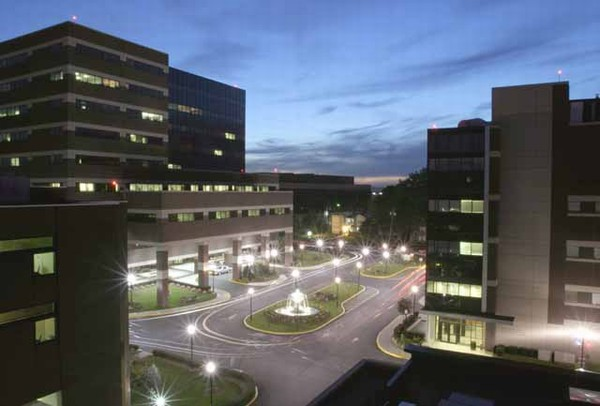
- "Where Medicine Meets Innovation"

Geography
- Location: 30 Prospect Avenue, Hackensack, New Jersey; U.S.
- Coordinates: 40°53′03″N 74°03′27″W

Organisation
- Care system: Medicare (US), Medicaid, Charity care
- Type: Teaching
- Affiliated university: Rutgers University - New Jersey Medical School
- Network: Hackensack Meridian Health

Services
- Standards: JCAHO
- Emergency department: Level I Adult Trauma Center / Level II Pediatric Trauma Center (see Joseph M. Sanzari Children's Hospital)
- Beds: 950
- Speciality: Cardiac care and cardiac surgery, geriatric services (State-Designated Children's Hospital and ANA Magnet Facility)

Helipads
- Helipad: FAA LID: NJ22

History
- Founded: 1888

Links
- Website: www.hackensackumc.org
- Other links: NACHRI; AAMC; ANA; Planetree Alliance

Hackensack University Medical Center (HUMC) is a 950-bed non-profit, research and teaching hospital providing tertiary and healthcare needs located in Hackensack, Bergen County, New Jersey, seven miles (11 km) west of New York City. As of 2019, it ranks as the second-largest hospital in New Jersey and No. 59 in the US. HUMC is the largest hospital in the Hackensack Meridian Health Health System. It is affiliated with the New Jersey Medical School of Rutgers University and Hackensack Meridian School of Medicine. The medical center was founded in 1888 as Bergen County's first hospital, with 12 beds. The hospital is an ACS verified level 1 trauma center, one of five in the state. In 2021 it was given a grade A by the Leapfrog patient safety organization.

== About ==
As of 2021, HUMC is Bergen County's largest employer with around 9,000 employees and an annual budget of $1 billion. The hospital's staff of 1,400 physicians and dentists covers the full range of medical and dental specialties and sub-specialties. It is the largest inpatient/outpatient provider in the state, attending to more than 100,000 patients annually.

HUMC is a designated Magnet Hospital, recognized for nursing excellence by the ANA. It is the first hospital in New Jersey and second in the nation to receive this recognition. HUMC has a New Jersey state-designated Children's Hospital (Joseph M. Sanzari Children's Hospital) that is a full-voting member in the National Association of Children's Hospitals and Related Institutions (NACHRI). It is also a member of the Association of American Medical Colleges' New Jersey Council of Teaching Hospitals (NJCTH).

On March 4, 2020, Phil Murphy and Sheila Oliver announced the first confirmed COVID-19 case in New Jersey. The patient was treated at Hackensack University Medical Center. On March 6, 2020, a second case of COVID-19 was confirmed at HUMC and four days later it was announced that the patient died.

Hackensack University Medical Center has a Health Awareness Regional Program and an Employee Assistance Program Development both located at 2 Sears Drive in Paramus. Two programs are located Westwood; the Geriatric Assessment Program and The Home Health Agency. HUMC also maintains an office for The Home Health Agency in East Rutherford.

In September 2021, the hospital administration announced that they were upgraded to level 1 trauma center status by the American College of Surgeons. The hospital was previously a level 2 trauma center. Also that year, U.S. News & World Report's Best Hospital Ranking listed HUMC #1 in New Jersey and #7 in New York Metro.

== Facilities ==
=== Campus ===
HUMC's campus houses the Hackensack University Medical Plaza building, which was constructed in 1998, and opened on September 21, 1998, and is one of the largest adult ambulatory care facilities in the United States.

Other campus buildings are the Jeffrey M. Creamer Trauma Center; the Dr. John Apovian Prompt Care Center; the Hekemian Conference Center; The Hillcrest Building; the George Link Jr. Pavilion, which houses the Banta Lobby, Emil Buehler Helipad, and the Samuel Toscano Sr. Surgical Suite; Johnson Hall; The Patient Pavilion; and St. John's Building.

Key facilities by specialty include:

==== Medical arts and learning ====
The Alfred N. Sanzari Medical Arts Building and Learning Center (Opened in 2002)

==== Children and pediatric ====
- The Audrey Hepburn Children's House, a state-designated Regional Diagnostic Center for Child Abuse and Neglect (Opened in 2002)
- David Joseph Jurist Research Center for Tomorrows Children, which houses the David and Alice Jurist Institute for Research and the Deirdre Imus Environmental Center for Pediatric Oncology (Opened in 2000)
- Don Imus/WFAN Pediatric Center for Tomorrows Children (Opened in 1994)
- The Sarkis Gabrellian Women's and Children's Pavilion, which houses The Joseph M. Sanzari Children's Hospital (Opened in 2006)
- The Donna A. Sanzari Women's Hospital, and The Mark Messier Skyway for Tomorrow's Children (Opened in 2006)
- The Sarkis and Siran Child Care and Learning Center (Opened in 1994)

==== Diabetes ====
The MOLLY Diabetes Center for Adults (established in 1996)

==== Off-campus facilities ====
HUMC maintains offices around the perimeter of its campus as well as in downtown Hackensack. These include the Center for Trauma Recovery, the QUEST Adult Outpatient Program, Health Awareness Regional Program (HARP), the Geriatric Assessment Program, the Hospice Program, and HUMC's Home Health Agency.

=== Affiliations ===
==== HUMC at Pascack Valley ("HPV") ====
HPV is a full-service hospital established in 2013 partnered with for-profit partner LHP Hospital Group (now Ardent Health Services). On October 1, 2008, it opened as Hackensack University Medical Center North at Pascack Valley, "a satellite emergency department to treat non-life-threatening emergencies."

==== Joseph M. Sanzari Children's Hospital ====
The Joseph M. Sanzari Children's Hospital is a 105-bed pediatric acute care hospital connected to Hackensack University Medical Center.

==== HUMC at Mountainside ====
Mountainside Hospital (also known as HackensackUMC Mountainside), located in Montclair, New Jersey, became part of the Hackensack network when it was acquired by Hackensack and Ardent Health Services jointly in 2012 from Merit Health Systems.

==== The Centers at Hasbrouck Heights ====
The Centers at Hasbrouck Heights includes The Dave Winfield Nutrition Center, established in 1986 by Dave Winfield and the Community Health Center located in a branch of the HUMC's Geriatrics Clinic. The Dave Winfield Nutrition Center has an additional location at Hackensack University Medical Center, in the Hackensack University Medical Plaza.

==== The Centers at Franklin Lakes ====
The Centers at Franklin Lakes houses HUMC's The Cancer Center and a branch of The Betty Torricelli Institute for Breast Care.

==== John Theurer Cancer Center ====
The John Theurer Cancer Center (JTCC) at HUMC performs research and oncology services. Areas of concentration include blood and marrow stem cell transplantation, lymphoma, leukemia, multiple myeloma, neuro-oncology, cutaneous malignancy, gastrointestinal, geriatric, head and neck, thoracic, urologic, breast, and gynecologic.

In 2019 it received approval from the National Cancer Institute (NCI) as a research consortium member of the NCI-approved Georgetown Lombardi Comprehensive Cancer Center Consortium. JTCC supports the Northeast's largest bone marrow transplant (BMT) program and in 2014 performed 400 transplants.

== Mobile intensive care unit ==
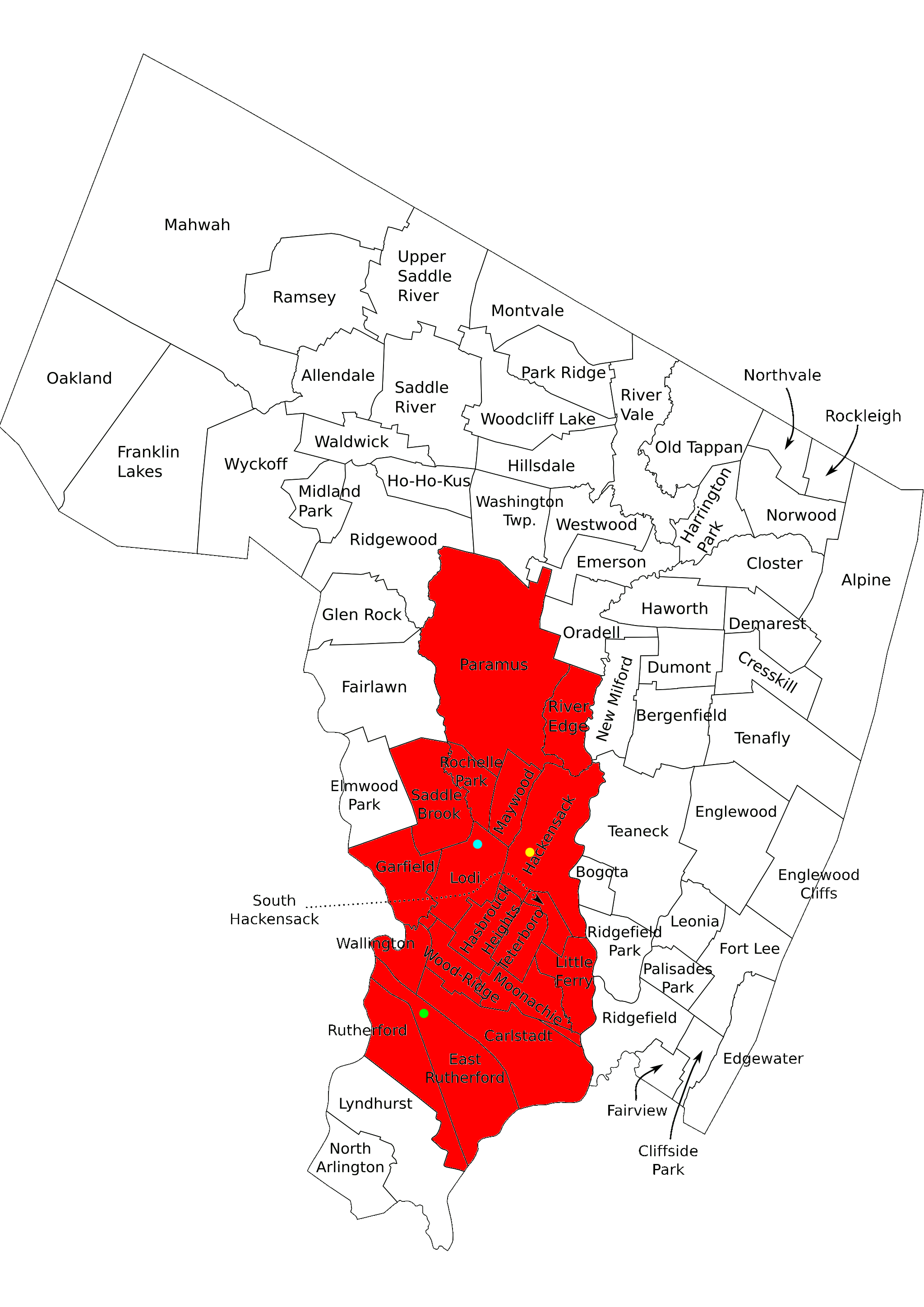
HUMC mobile ICU coverage

As of 2007, Hackensack University Medical Center provides advanced life support coverage to 35 municipalities and operates five paramedic fly-cars. Four are in service 24 hours a day, seven days a week. One full-time unit is stationed a few blocks away from the main campus; another full-time unit is located in East Rutherford on Paterson Avenue; two additional units are stationed at Hackensack University Medical Center North at Pascack Valley; and its fifth, which is a part-time unit, is stationed in Lodi at the Volunteer Ambulance Corps during its hours of operation. A sixth unit stationed in Teterboro is a hybrid ALS unit and Specialty Care Transport Unit. That unit is in a specially equipped ambulance and is transport capable.
