= Jason Donald (baseball) =

American baseball player (born 1984)

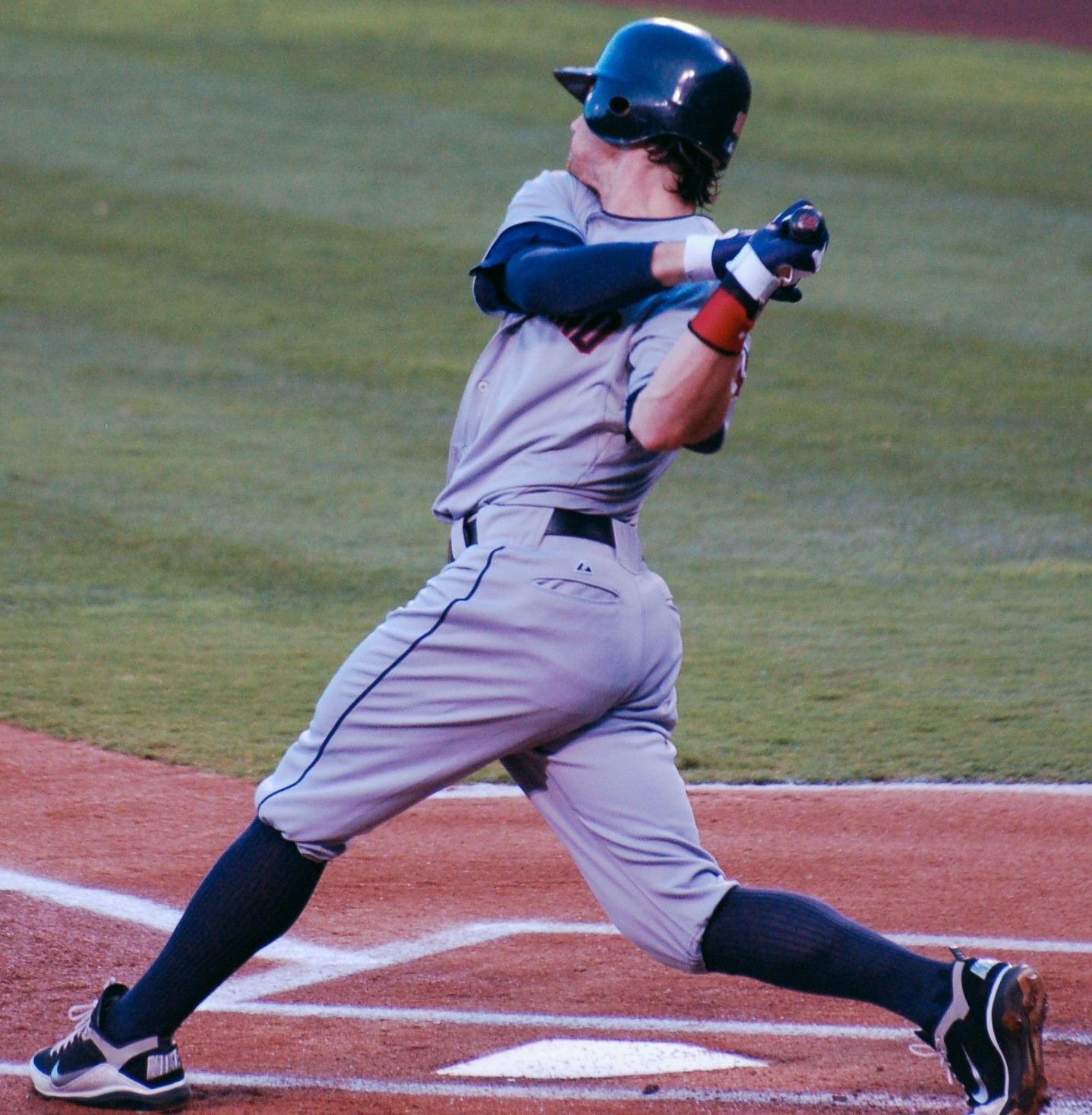
- Donald with the Cleveland Indians
- Shortstop / Second baseman
- Born: September 4, 1984 (age 41); Fresno, California, U.S.
- Batted: Right Threw: Right

MLB debut
- May 18, 2010, for the Cleveland Indians

Last MLB appearance
- October 3, 2012, for the Cleveland Indians

MLB statistics
- Batting average: .257
- Home runs: 7
- Runs Batted In: 43
- Stats at Baseball Reference

Teams
- Cleveland Indians (2010–2012)
Medals
Men's baseball
Representing United States
Olympic Games
Bronze medal – third place	2008 Beijing	Team

Jason Thomas Donald (born September 4, 1984) is an American former professional baseball utility player. He played in Major League Baseball (MLB) for the Cleveland Indians.

== Early life ==
Donald attended Buchanan High School in Clovis, California, where his father was the coach of the baseball team. He played college baseball for the University of Arizona. In 2004 and 2005, he played collegiate summer baseball with the Cotuit Kettleers of the Cape Cod Baseball League, and was named a league all-star in 2005.

== Professional career ==
=== Philadelphia Phillies ===
Donald was drafted by the Philadelphia Phillies in the third round (97th overall pick) of the 2006 MLB draft. He was originally drafted by the Anaheim Angels in the 20th round of the 2003 MLB draft directly from high school, but chose not to sign.

Donald was selected and participated in several All-Star games during the course of the 2008 season including the Eastern League All-Star game, and the premier event for minor leaguers, the MLB All-Star Futures Game (which in 2008 was played at Yankee Stadium).

In 2009, Donald played nine games with the Gulf Coast League Phillies, going 6 for 26 (.231) before being assigned to the Lehigh Valley IronPigs of the International League. While with the Pigs, Jason had a .236 batting average with one home run over the course of 51 games.

On July 29, 2009, the Phillies traded Donald, along with Carlos Carrasco, Lou Marson, and Jason Knapp to the Cleveland Indians in exchange for Cliff Lee and Ben Francisco.

=== Cleveland Indians ===
On May 18, 2010, replacing injured Cleveland Indians shortstop Asdrúbal Cabrera, Donald played against the Tampa Bay Rays and recorded his first major league hit on his first plate appearance. In his second at bat, he singled to right field against Rays starter David Price to begin his major league career 2-for-2. He then walked in his third at bat.

On June 2, 2010, Donald was the 27th batter faced by Armando Galarraga, who was one out away from pitching a perfect game. Donald hit a ground ball to the right side of first baseman Miguel Cabrera, who fielded the ball cleanly and tossed the ball to Galarraga, who was covering first base. First base umpire Jim Joyce called Donald safe, but replay showed that the throw beat Donald by one step.

=== Cincinnati Reds ===
On December 11, 2012, Donald was traded to the Cincinnati Reds in a three-team deal that also involved the Arizona Diamondbacks. Shin-Soo Choo went with Donald to Cincinnati. Cleveland acquired Drew Stubbs from the Reds and Trevor Bauer, Matt Albers and Bryan Shaw from the Diamondbacks. Arizona received Lars Anderson and Tony Sipp from the Indians and Didi Gregorius from the Reds. On March 31, 2013, Donald was designated for assignment by the Reds. He cleared waivers and was sent outright to the Triple-A Louisville Bats on April 4. In 78 appearances for Louisville, Donald batted .219/.268/.319 with two home runs, 17 RBI, and two stolen bases. He elected free agency following the season on November 4.

=== Kansas City Royals ===
On December 28, 2013, Donald signed a minor league contract with the Kansas City Royals organization. In 25 appearances for the Triple-A Omaha Storm Chasers, Donald slashed .231/.271/.308 with one home run, five RBI, and one stolen base.

=== Texas Rangers ===
On May 28, 2014, Donald was traded to the Texas Rangers in exchange for cash considerations. In 44 appearances for the Triple-A Round Rock Express, he batted .236/.306/.368 with three home runs, eight RBI, and three stolen bases. Donald became a free agent following the season on November 4.

== Olympics ==
Donald and Indians backup catcher Lou Marson were selected to the United States national baseball team. Donald helped lead the United States to a bronze medal at the 2008 Summer Olympics. Donald homered in the bronze medal game and led the team at the games in batting average, on-base percentage and slugging percentage. Donald batted .381 for the Games.

== Awards and honors ==
In 2008, Donald received the Arizona Fall League's Dernell Stenson Sportsmanship Award.
