= Lou Marson =

American baseball player & coach (born 1986)

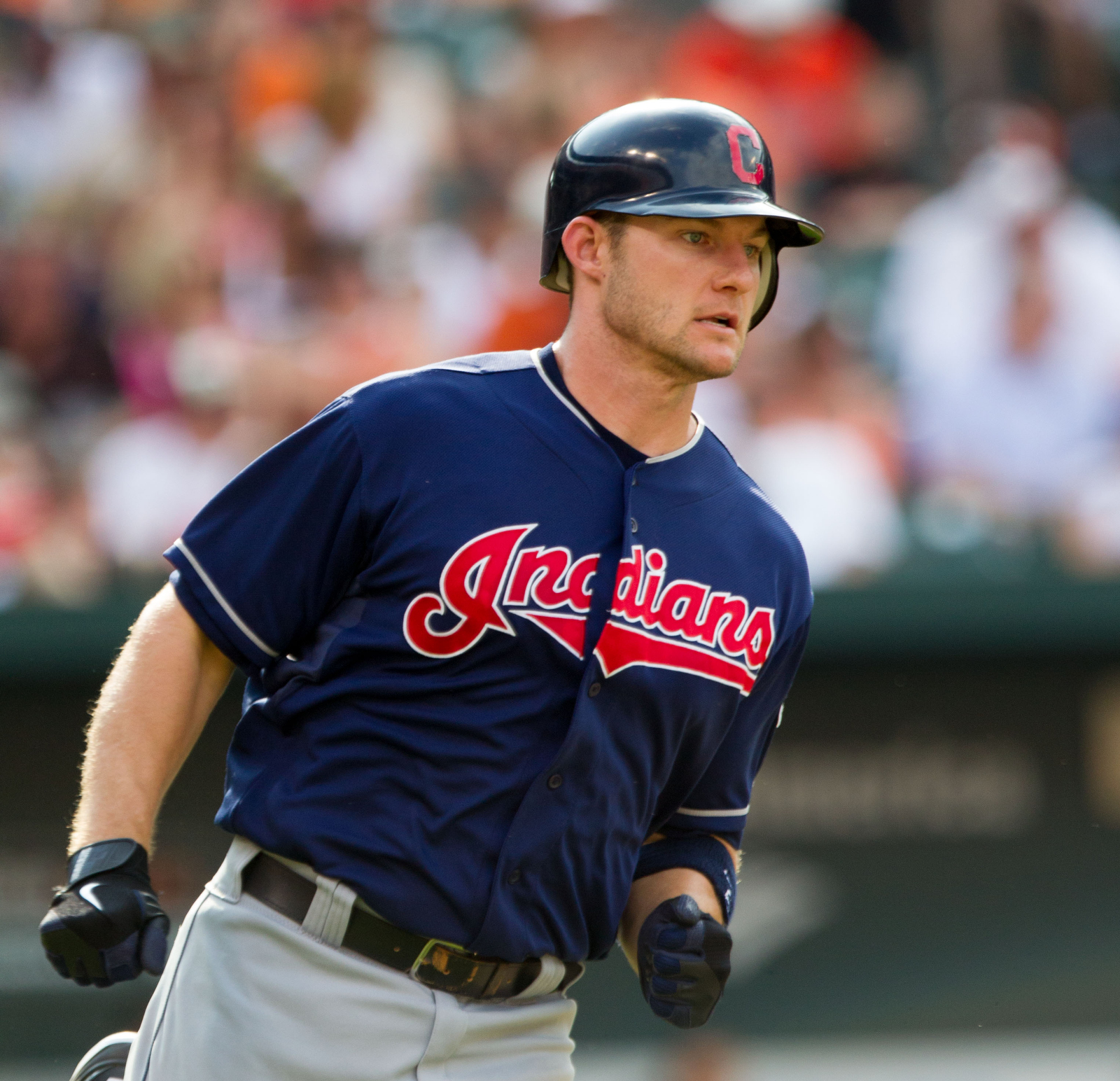
- Marson playing for the Indians in 2012
- Catcher
- Born: June 26, 1986 (age 40); Scottsdale, Arizona, U.S.
- Batted: Right Threw: Right

MLB debut
- September 28, 2008, for the Philadelphia Phillies

Last MLB appearance
- April 24, 2013, for the Cleveland Indians

MLB statistics
- Batting average: .219
- Home runs: 5
- Runs batted in: 60
- Stats at Baseball Reference

Teams
- Philadelphia Phillies (2008–2009); Cleveland Indians (2009–2013)
Medals
Men's baseball
Representing United States
Olympic Games
Bronze medal – third place	2008 Beijing	Team competition

Louis Glenn Marson (born June 26, 1986) is an American former professional baseball catcher, who played in Major League Baseball (MLB) for the Philadelphia Phillies and Cleveland Indians, from 2008 through 2013. Marson also played in the 2008 Summer Olympics.

== Playing career ==
=== Philadelphia Phillies ===
==== Minor leagues ====
The Philadelphia Phillies drafted Marson in the fourth round of the 2004 Major League Baseball draft out of Coronado High School in Scottsdale, Arizona. During 2004, he played with the Gulf Coast League Phillies instructional league team, where he ended the season with a seven-game hitting streak. In 38 games, Marson amassed a total of 29 hits, including three doubles and four home runs, for a batting average of .257. He also stole four bases. During his first full season in the Phillies' system, Marson played with the A-level Batavia Muckdogs. He played 60 games for the short-season squad, batting .245 with five home runs and three triples. He also drew 27 bases on balls and hit .351 against left-handed pitchers.

Moving up to the South Atlantic League for the 2006 season, Marson had a team-leading five triples and four stolen bases, though his average fell to .243. He notched a four-hit game against the Hagerstown Suns, a four-RBI game in August against the Delmarva Shorebirds, and reached base safely in nearly every game in July. Marson had 85 hits in 350 at-bats in 2006 and added 29 walks for a .343 on-base percentage. Marson made his first appearance at the Phillies' spring training in 2007, after which he was assigned to the high-A Clearwater Threshers. He led the 2007 Threshers in batting average (.288) among qualifying players, hit 7 home runs and batted in 63 runs. He established himself as a solid fielder behind the plate, making only three errors in the final 37 games of the season and finishing with a fielding percentage of .982 for the season. After the 2007 season, Marson was recognized as one of the top ten prospects in the Phillies' minor league system by Baseball America.

In 2008, Marson won the Paul Owens Award as the top minor league player in the Phillies' farm system. In 94 games behind the plate for the Double-A Reading Phillies, Marson batted .314 with five home runs and 18 doubles. He also walked 68 times. For his efforts, he was named to both the midseason and post-season Eastern League All-Star teams. He led that league, and all Double-A leagues, in on-base percentage with a .433 mark and posted a 14-game hitting streak at the end of May, during which he had a grand slam and six RBI in one game. A converted infielder with a strong arm, he allowed 30 baserunners in 83 stolen-base attempts for a steal percentage of 36%. The Phillies purchased Marson's contract at the conclusion of the 2008 Eastern League season, and he was called up to the majors for the postseason stretch run. After the season, the Phillies' farm system director, Steve Noworyta, said that Marson "continues, like fine wine, to get better as he ages." His stock as a Baseball America prospect rose from eighth in the system to third, and he was named one of the top 50 prospects in Major League Baseball.

Marson and Reading teammate Jason Donald were selected to the United States national baseball team for the 2008 Olympics, where they won the bronze medal. National team manager Davey Johnson said that "[he] really impressed me during (the Futures Game)… He caught the first three innings. We don't give the signs to the catcher. He told (pitcher) Brett Anderson to throw over to first and he picked (a runner off). His numbers are outstanding for a catcher—great offensive catcher—and I got reports that said everything about him is good."

==== Major leagues ====
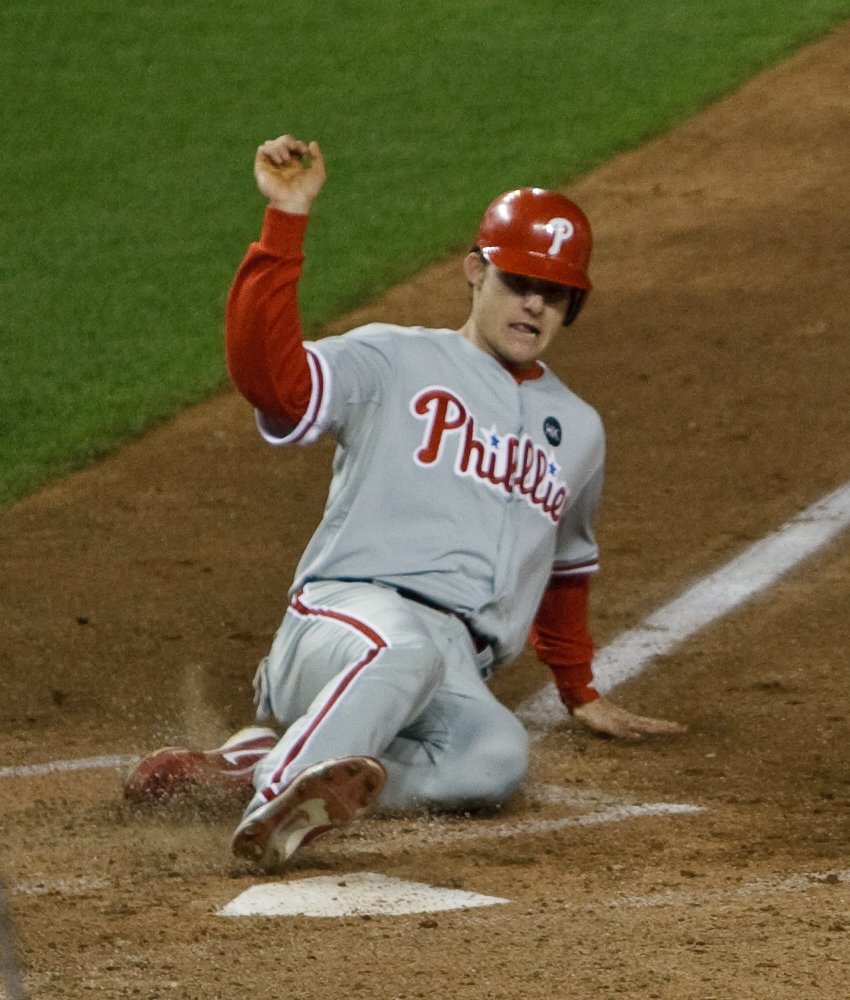
Marson playing for the Phillies in 2009

Marson was called up to the Phillies on September 1, 2008. He had his first major league hit off of Odalis Perez on September 28 against the Washington Nationals. He later scored his first run in the same inning. In the same game, he also hit his first big league home run off Marco Estrada. This was on the final day of the 2008 season; though Marson was not included on the World Series-winning roster, he did travel with the team in case of injuries. He did receive a World Series ring, in spite of all this. After the end of the postseason, Marson participated in the Arizona Fall League, where he played for the Mesa Solar Sox.

Marson participated in the major league 2009 spring training with the Phillies, where veteran starter Jamie Moyer expressed his pleasure with Marson's skills and ability to call the game. Assistant GM Chuck LaMar said that "[his] strength has actually become his ability to run the game… That is unique for a converted catcher. We think he's one of the finest catching prospects in baseball." Marson was reassigned to the minor leagues on March 23, but was called up to the majors on April 11 to replace Carlos Ruiz, who injured his right oblique muscle. He went 1-for-4 in one game for the Lehigh Valley IronPigs before his call-up.

=== Cleveland Indians ===
On July 29, 2009, the Phillies traded Marson, along with Jason Donald, Carlos Carrasco, and Jason Knapp to the Cleveland Indians in exchange for Cliff Lee and Ben Francisco.

Over the next three seasons, Marson was a fixture behind the plate for Cleveland, playing in over 70 games in each of the 2010, 2011, and 2012 seasons—however, he struggled at the plate, never hitting higher than .230. After a 2013 season in which he only appeared in 3 games at the major league level, Marson was non-tendered by the Indians, becoming a free agent.

=== Philadelphia Phillies (second stint) ===
On December 18, 2013, Marson signed a minor league contract with the Philadelphia Phillies. He was released on March 14, 2014.

=== Cincinnati Reds ===
On May 8, 2014, Marson signed a minor league contract with the Cincinnati Reds. He played in seven games for the Double-A Pensacola Blue Wahoos, going 5-for-23 (.217) with two RBI and one stolen base. Marson became a free agent following the season.

Marson re-signed with Cincinnati on a minor league contract on January 30, 2015. He played in six games for Pensacola, going 5-for-19 (.263) with two RBI. Marson was released by the Reds organization on June 22.

=== Los Angeles Angels ===
On February 8, 2016, Marson signed a minor league contract with the Los Angeles Angels. He became a free agent following the season.

== Coaching career ==
Marson served as hitting coach of the Salt Lake Bees, the Los Angeles Angels' Triple-A affiliate, in 2017. The next year, he managed the Mobile BayBears, their Double-A affiliate. In 2019, the Angels named Marson the manager of Salt Lake.
