= Jason Knapp (baseball) =

American baseball player (born 1990)

- Pitcher
- Born: August 31, 1990 (age 36); Westwood, New Jersey, U.S.
- Bats: Right Throws: Right
- Stats at Baseball Reference

Jason C. Knapp (born August 31, 1990) is an American former professional baseball pitcher.

== Career ==
Knapp grew up in Clinton Township, New Jersey and attended North Hunterdon High School. The Philadelphia Phillies drafted Knapp in the second round of the 2008 Major League Baseball draft. He quickly became a top prospect in the Phillies organization. In 2009, he was traded to the Cleveland Indians along with Carlos Carrasco, Lou Marson and Jason Donald for Cliff Lee and Ben Francisco. The Indians considered Knapp the key to the deal, and would not trade Lee without receiving Knapp.

Coming into the 2010 season, Knapp was rated the 64th best prospect in baseball by Baseball America. However, he missed the 2011 season due to injury. After his second shoulder surgery, the Indians released Knapp in 2012.

Knapp later began to attempt a comeback. He signed with the Texas Rangers on February 14, 2014, and was assigned to the Myrtle Beach Pelicans of the High-A Carolina League.
