= Pascack Valley Hospital =

Geography
- Location: Westwood, New Jersey, United States
- Coordinates: 40°59′6.75″N 74°0′54.95″W

Organization
- Care system: Medicare (US), Medicaid, Public
- Type: Community
- Affiliated university: New York Medical College

Services
- Emergency department: Yes
- Beds: 291

Helipads
- Helipad: FAA LID: JY29

History
- Opened: June 1, 1959
- Closed: November 21, 2007

Links
- Website: PVH
- Lists: Hospitals in New Jersey

Pascack Valley Hospital (PVH) is a former 291-bed hospital, located at 250 Old Hook Road, Westwood, New Jersey.

== History ==
Pascack Valley Hospital opened on June 1, 1959, as an 86-bed community hospital. It underwent several expansions and grew to 291 beds.

In 2005, the PVH completed construction on a new four-story addition to the hospital. This caused the hospital to incur an additional $80 million in debt. This, combined with several years of operating losses, forced Well Care Group, the owner of the hospital, to seek a buyer. In November 2006, Hackensack University Medical Center (HUMC) entered into a memorandum of understanding with PVH to acquire the hospital, with plans to keep the facility operating as a full acute-care hospital.

Ultimately, Pascack's agreement with HUMC fell through, and on September 24, 2007, the hospital filed for Chapter 11 bankruptcy, with plans to liquidate the hospital's assets. In anticipation of closure, PVH began to limit its admissions. On November 21, the facility stopped providing medical care, and the administrative remaining departments closed shortly thereafter.

== Liquidation of assets ==
Days before the hospital closed in November 2007, the certificate of need for the hospital's mobile intensive care unit (which had provided advanced life support services to 18 towns in the Pascack and Northern Valleys) was auctioned in U.S. Bankruptcy Court. Hackensack University Medical Center was the winning bidder at $3.6 million. On November 21, as soon as PVH closed its doors, HUMC began providing paramedic services to the area.

After several delays, the hospital building and property were auctioned on February 27, 2008. Hackensack University Medical Center and Touro University College of Medicine won with a joint bid of $45 million. At the time, they had plans to reopen a full-service hospital and a new medical school. But in September 2008, Touro backed out of the deal, deciding instead to open their medical school in Hasbrouck Heights.

== Rebirth ==
On October 1, 2008, HUMC opened up a satellite emergency department called Hackensack University Medical Center North at Pascack Valley.

HUMC, jointly with Legacy Hospital Partners, Inc. (now Ardent Health Services), sought to obtain a license to open a 128-bed acute care facility at the PVH site. In February 2012, the New Jersey Health Commissioner announced approval of the HUMC application to open a fully functioning hospital on the site. The new hospital has 128 beds and is the first for-profit facility of its kind in Bergen County.
