= Westwood, New Jersey =

Borough in Bergen County, New Jersey, US

- Borough
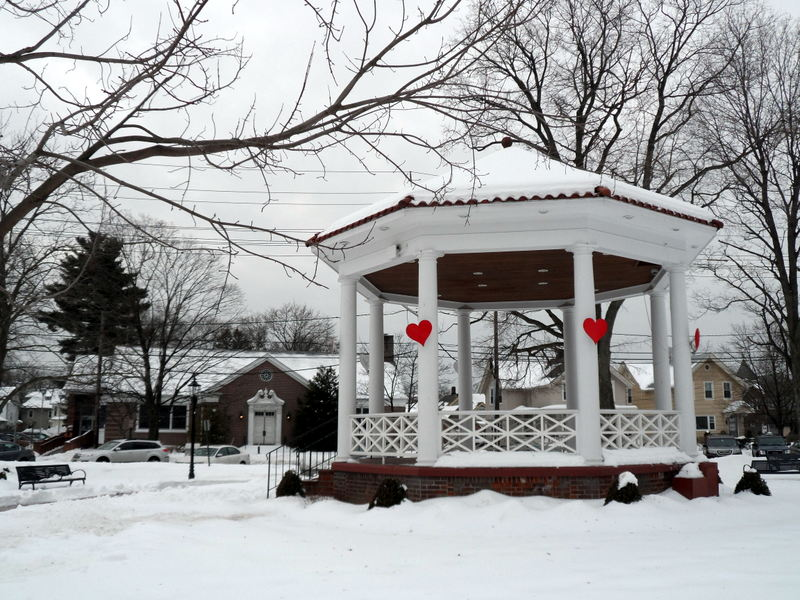
- Westwood Gazebo in 2014

- Seal
- Motto: "Hub of the Pascack Valley"
- Location of Westwood in Bergen County highlighted in red (left). Inset map: Location of Bergen County in New Jersey highlighted in orange (right).

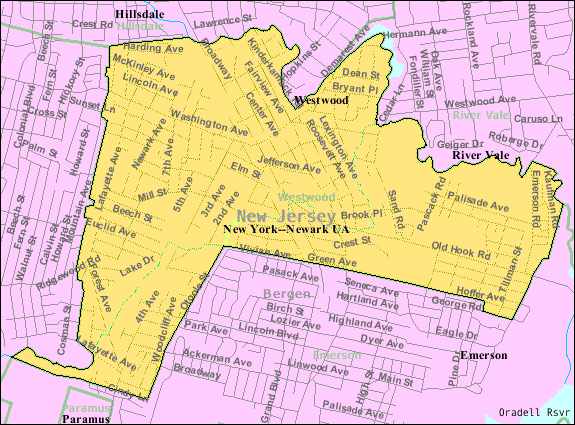
- Census Bureau map of Westwood, New Jersey

- Location in Bergen County Location in New Jersey Location in the United States
- Coordinates: 40.989032°N 74.031872°W
- Country: United States
- State: New Jersey
- County: Bergen
- Incorporated: May 8, 1894

Government
  - Type: Borough
  - Body: Borough Council
  - Mayor: Raymond Arroyo (R, term ends December 31, 2023)
  - Administrator: Durene Ayer
  - Municipal clerk: Karen Hughes

Area
  - Total: 2.30 sq mi (5.95 km^{2})
  - Land: 2.26 sq mi (5.85 km^{2})
  - Water: 0.039 sq mi (0.10 km^{2}) 1.74%
  - Rank: 388th of 565 in state 43rd of 70 in county
- Elevation: 66 ft (20 m)

Population (2020)
  - Total: 11,282
  - Estimate (2023): 11,210
  - Rank: 221st of 565 in state 33rd of 70 in county
  - Density: 4,994.2/sq mi (1,928.3/km^{2})
  - Rank: 112th of 565 in state 29th of 70 in county
- Time zone: UTC−05:00 (Eastern (EST))
  - Summer (DST): UTC−04:00 (Eastern (EDT))
- ZIP Codes: 07675, 07677
- Area code: 201
- FIPS code: 3400380270
- GNIS feature ID: 0885442
- Website: www.westwoodnj.gov

Westwood (known as "The Hub of the Pascack Valley") is a borough in Bergen County, in the U.S. state of New Jersey. Westwood is part of the New York metropolitan area. Many of its residents regularly commute to New York City for work and leisure, many using public transportation. As of the 2020 United States census, the borough's population was 11,282, an increase of 374 (+3.4%) from the 2010 census count of 10,908, which in turn reflected a decline of 91 (−0.8%) from the 10,999 counted in the 2000 census.

Westwood was officially incorporated as a borough on May 8, 1894, from portions of Washington Township, early during the "Boroughitis" phenomenon then sweeping through Bergen County, in which 26 boroughs were formed in the county in 1894 alone. Isaac D. Bogert served as the first mayor of the borough. In April 1909, Westwood was enlarged through the annexation of the "Old Hook" section of the borough of Emerson, and on September 24, 1957, portions of the borough were exchanged with Emerson.

== History ==
The Lenni-Lenape Native Americans inhabited this part of the state and shared it with the transient hunters and trappers until the permanent settlers began to enter in mid-18th century. In the early 19th century, the area that would later become Westwood was within the larger political boundaries of Harrington Township, which had been established by royal charter in 1775. In 1840, the western half of Harrington Township became Washington Township, with the Hackensack River as the dividing line. Washington Township was an agrarian region with isolated farmsteads. Early families, including the Hoppers and Ackermans, are buried at the Old Hook Cemetery. An 18th-century mill was situated at the dammed stream near the intersection of today's Mill Street and First Avenue. This mill was on an important east west pathway and was the first on Musquapsink Brook. The mill was largely destroyed after a fire set by an arsonist and was dismantled in 1910.

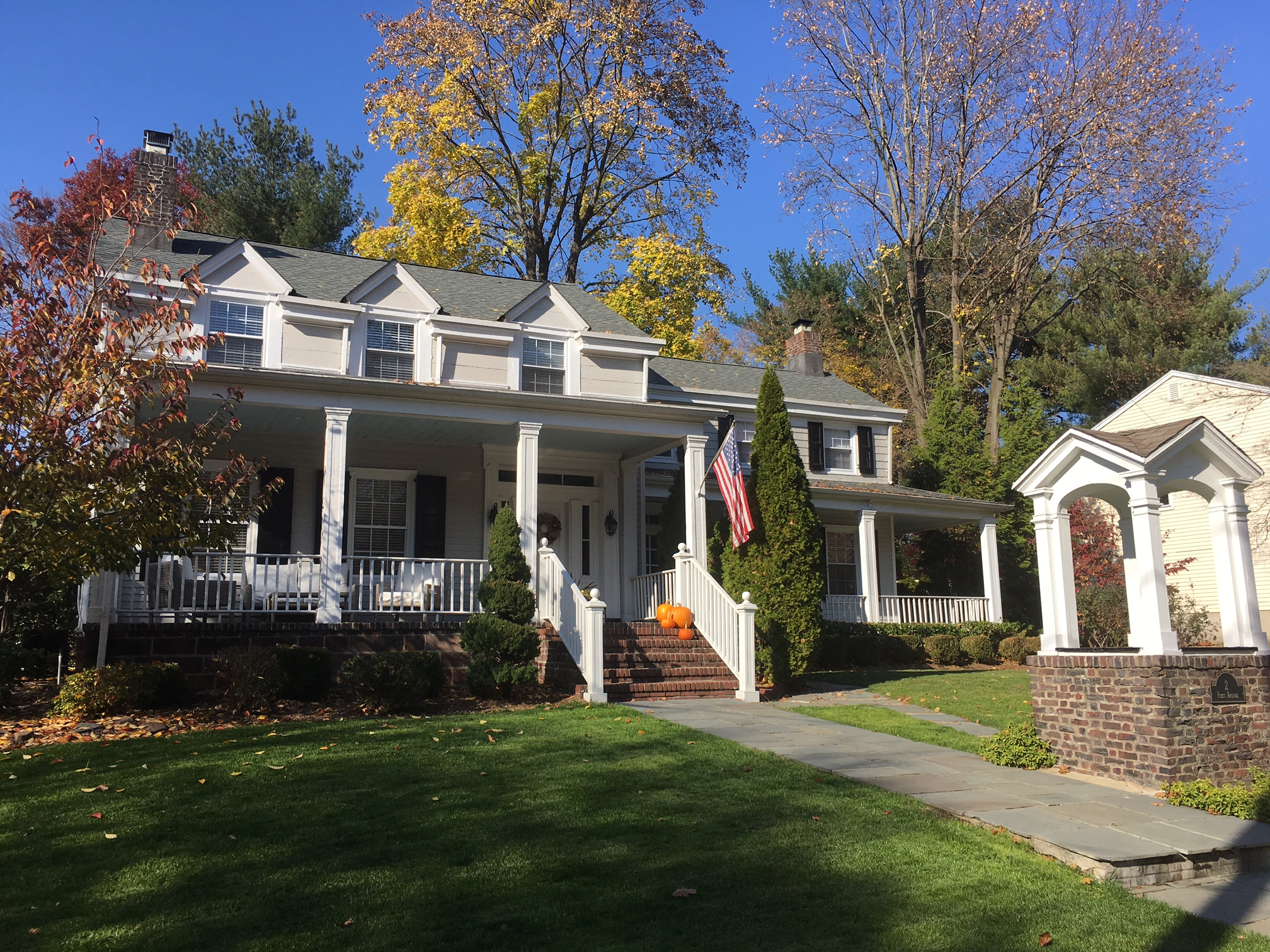
2 1st Ave Westwood NJ Built in 1773. Owned by the Bogert family till 1910. currently owned by the Sandt Family.

A brief description of Washington Township written in 1844 described it as a township with six stores, four schools for 135 students, six grist mills, and 14 saw mills.

The first wave of concentrated development took place as the result of the coming of the Hackensack and New York Railroad in 1870, which followed the route of today's Pascack Valley Line. On March 5, 1870, service began between Westwood and New York City (via Jersey City and a ferry ride). Several small hotels were built near the depot, and in 1872 several houses in the latest European-influenced styles began to be built along Centre Avenue. Old maps show that growth occurred simultaneously on the land both to the east and west of the tracks. The commercial buildings included lumber and coal sheds, stores, and a bakery. There was a chapel on the corner of Third and Park Avenues. The triangular park that has played an important role as a place of community gatherings is also shown on the 1876 map.

By the 1880s, Westwood had four factories, several distilleries, a new school, a laundry and grocery store, and a new Reformed Church. In 1890, following a meeting of interested residents, those favoring the incorporation of Westwood as an independent borough conducted a petition drive. In 1894, Westwood separated from Washington Township and became an independent borough. Elected as the borough's first mayor was Isaac D. Bogert.

In 1899, a water plant constructed by Cornelius S. DeBraun provided service to the houses that had been built along the borough's newly laid streets. By the time of the 1905 New Jersey Census, there were 234 dwellings housing a population of 1,044.

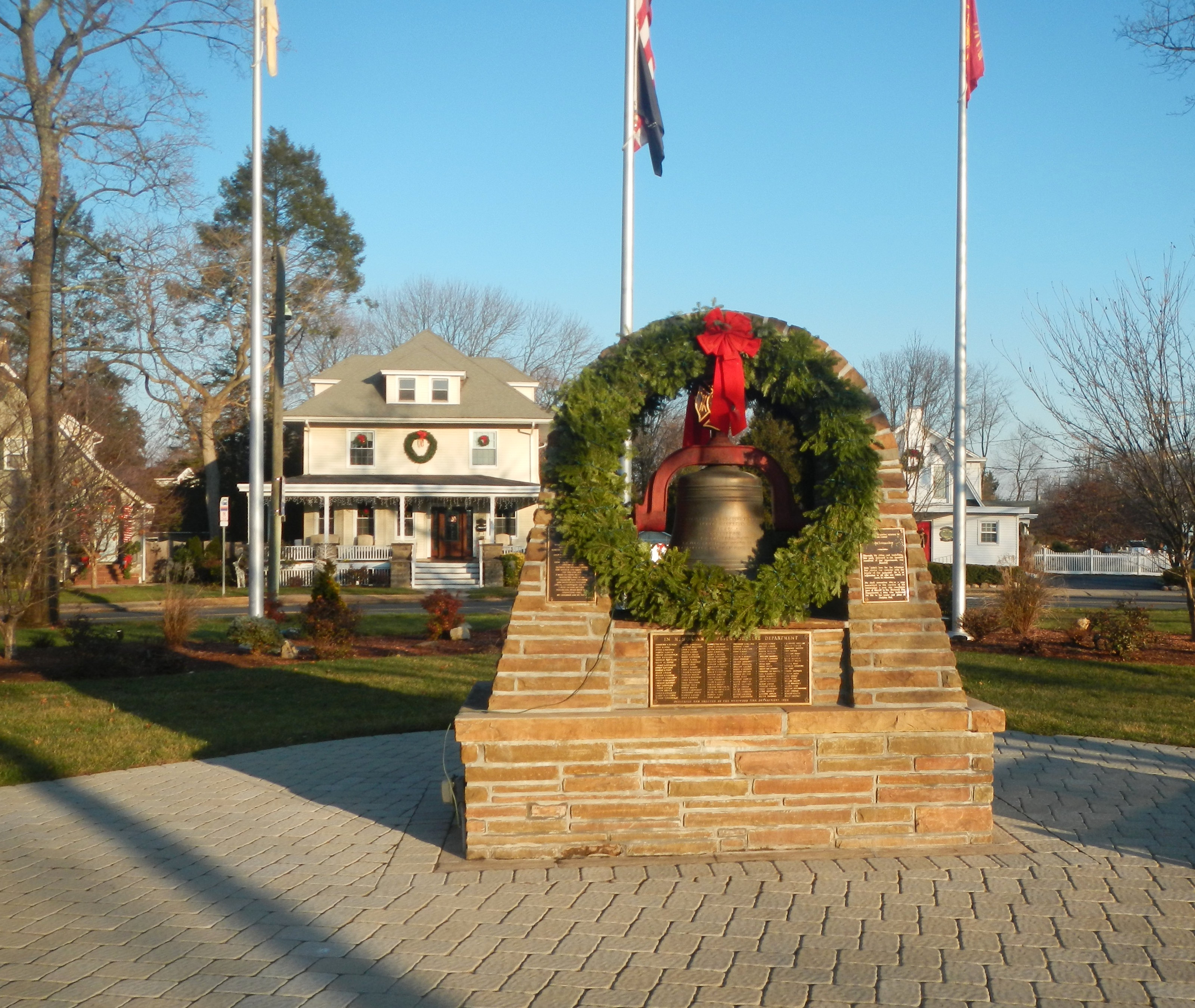
Westwood Park Place decorated for the holidays. Notice that the Fire Bell is covered with a Christmas Wreath

Lincoln High School was constructed around the turn of the 20th century, which also saw the introduction of electricity, telephones, and automobiles to the town. Underwood & Underwood Stereoscope Company opened a plant during the first decades of the 20th century, and many congregations established their first chapels, which were replaced in later years as the congregations grew in numbers and wealth. Following a typical pattern of development throughout the 20th century, the results are a mature railroad suburb almost covered with housing units, commercial, municipal and ecclesiastical buildings. The borough still retains the open space of the triangular park at its center.

== Geography ==
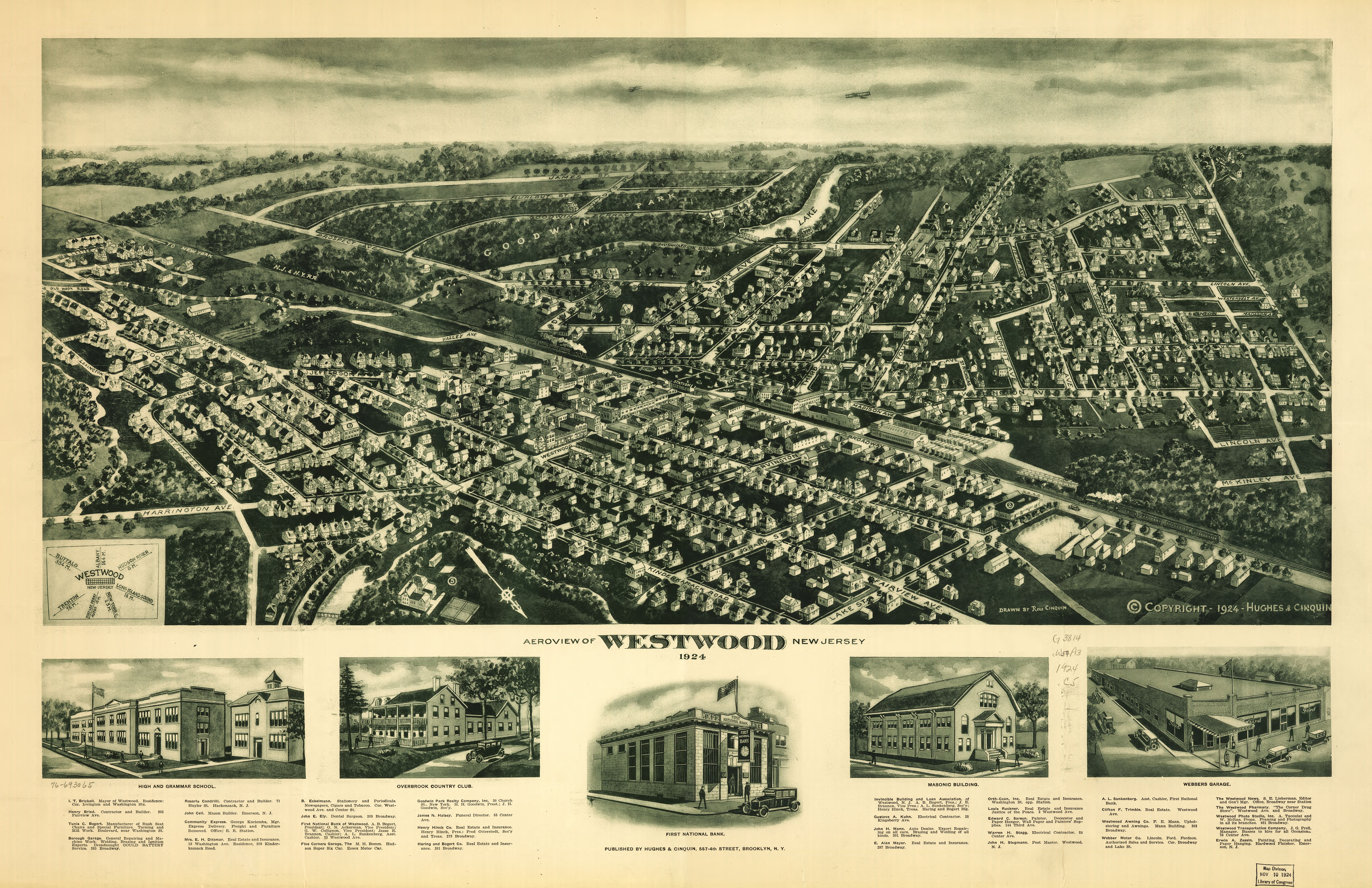
Panoramic map of Westwood from 1924 with list of landmarks and images of several inset

According to the United States Census Bureau, the borough had a total area of 2.30 square miles (5.95 km^{2}), including 2.26 square miles (5.85 km^{2}) of land and 0.04 square miles (0.10 km^{2}) of water (1.74%).

The borough borders the Bergen County municipalities of Emerson, Hillsdale, River Vale And Washington Township.

As of 2026, the borough is a member of Local Leaders for Responsible Planning in order to address the borough's Mount Laurel doctrine-based housing obligations.

== Demographics ==
Historical population
Census	Pop.	Note	%±
1900	828		—
1910	1,870		125.8%
1920	2,597		38.9%
1930	4,861		87.2%
1940	5,388		10.8%
1950	6,766		25.6%
1960	9,046		33.7%
1970	11,105		22.8%
1980	10,714		−3.5%
1990	10,446		−2.5%
2000	10,999		5.3%
2010	10,908		−0.8%
2020	11,282		3.4%
2023 (est.)	11,210	▼	−0.6%
Population sources: 1900–1920 1900–1910; 1910–1930 1900–2020; 2000 2010 2020

=== Racial and ethnic composition ===
Westwood borough, New Jersey – Racial and ethnic composition Note: the US Census treats Hispanic/Latino as an ethnic category. This table excludes Latinos from the racial categories and assigns them to a separate category. Hispanics/Latinos may be of any race.
Race / Ethnicity (NH = Non-Hispanic)	Pop 2000	Pop 2010	Pop 2020	% 2000	% 2010	% 2020
White alone (NH)	9,111	8,245	7,861	82.83%	75.59%	69.68%
Black or African American alone (NH)	624	466	448	5.67%	4.27%	3.97%
Native American or Alaska Native alone (NH)	10	5	6	0.09%	0.05%	0.05%
Asian alone (NH)	482	802	928	4.38%	7.35%	8.23%
Native Hawaiian or Pacific Islander alone (NH)	1	0	6	0.01%	0.00%	0.05%
Other race alone (NH)	20	5	33	0.18%	0.05%	0.29%
Mixed race or Multiracial (NH)	91	122	349	0.83%	1.12%	3.09%
Hispanic or Latino (any race)	660	1,263	1,651	6.00%	11.58%	14.63%
Total	10,999	10,908	11,282	100.00%	100.00%	100.00%

=== 2020 census ===
As of the 2020 census, Westwood had a population of 11,282. The median age was 43.0 years; 20.4% of residents were under the age of 18 and 19.7% were 65 years of age or older. For every 100 females there were 90.4 males, and for every 100 females age 18 and over there were 89.1 males age 18 and over.

100.0% of residents lived in urban areas, while 0.0% lived in rural areas.

There were 4,515 households in Westwood, of which 29.3% had children under the age of 18 living in them. Of all households, 50.2% were married-couple households, 16.1% were households with a male householder and no spouse or partner present, and 29.3% were households with a female householder and no spouse or partner present. About 29.6% of all households were made up of individuals and 14.9% had someone living alone who was 65 years of age or older.

There were 4,716 housing units, of which 4.3% were vacant. The homeowner vacancy rate was 0.4% and the rental vacancy rate was 4.9%.

=== 2010 census ===
The 2010 United States census counted 10,908 people, 4,438 households, and 2,858 families in the borough. The population density was 4,814.5 per square mile (1,858.9/km^{2}). There were 4,636 housing units at an average density of 2,046.2 per square mile (790.0/km^{2}). The racial makeup was 82.98% (9,052) White, 4.62% (504) Black or African American, 0.31% (34) Native American, 7.38% (805) Asian, 0.00% (0) Pacific Islander, 2.77% (302) from other races, and 1.93% (211) from two or more races. Hispanic or Latino of any race were 11.58% (1,263) of the population.

Of the 4,438 households, 29.1% had children under the age of 18; 52.0% were married couples living together; 8.7% had a female householder with no husband present and 35.6% were non-families. Of all households, 31.2% were made up of individuals and 14.1% had someone living alone who was 65 years of age or older. The average household size was 2.44 and the average family size was 3.11.

21.9% of the population were under the age of 18, 6.0% from 18 to 24, 27.5% from 25 to 44, 28.0% from 45 to 64, and 16.6% who were 65 years of age or older. The median age was 41.8 years. For every 100 females, the population had 92.7 males. For every 100 females ages 18 and older there were 88.8 males.

The Census Bureau's 2006–2010 American Community Survey showed that (in 2010 inflation-adjusted dollars) median household income was $79,133 (with a margin of error of +/− $5,195) and the median family income was $107,966 (+/− $10,189). Males had a median income of $70,598 (+/− $14,566) versus $52,721 (+/− $10,753) for females. The per capita income for the borough was $40,839 (+/− $2,990). About 1.8% of families and 2.8% of the population were below the poverty line, including 1.9% of those under age 18 and 4.7% of those age 65 or over.

Same-sex couples headed 21 households in 2010, an increase from the 19 counted in 2000.

=== 2000 census ===
As of the 2000 United States census, there were 10,999 people, 4,485 households, and 2,879 families residing in the borough. The population density was 4,745.0 inhabitants per square mile (1,832.1/km^{2}). There were 4,610 housing units at an average density of 1,988.8 per square mile (767.9/km^{2}). The racial makeup of the borough was 86.60% White, 4.39% Asian, 5.72% African American, 1.67% from other races, 0.14% Native American, 0.01% Pacific Islander, and 1.47% from two or more races. Hispanic or Latino of any race were 6.00% of the population.

There were 4,485 households, out of which 28.4% had children under the age of 18 living with them, 53.3% were married couples living together, 8.0% had a female householder with no husband present, and 35.8% were non-families. 31.1% of all households were made up of individuals, and 13.4% had someone living alone who was 65 years of age or older. The average household size was 2.42 and the average family size was 3.08.

In the borough the population was spread out, with 21.5% under the age of 18, 5.6% from 18 to 24, 33.6% from 25 to 44, 23.4% from 45 to 64, and 15.9% who were 65 years of age or older. The median age was 39 years. For every 100 females, there were 90.3 males. For every 100 females age 18 and over, there were 85.1 males.

The median income for a household in the borough was $59,868, and the median income for a family was $77,105. Males had a median income of $50,800 versus $42,459 for females. The per capita income for the borough was $32,083. About 1.8% of families and 4.4% of the population were below the poverty line, including 2.8% of those under age 18 and 8.7% of those age 65 or over.

== Government ==
=== Local government ===
Westwood is governed under the borough form of New Jersey municipal government, one of 218 municipalities (of the 564) statewide that use this form, the state's most common form of government. The governing body is comprised of a mayor directly elected by the voters and a borough council. The mayor serves a four-year term of office, and the borough council includes six members who serve three-year terms of office on a staggered basis, with two seats coming up for election each year in a three-year cycle. The borough form of government used by Westwood is a "weak mayor / strong council" government in which council members act as the legislative body with the mayor presiding at meetings and voting only in the event of a tie. The mayor can veto ordinances subject to an override by a two-thirds majority vote of the council. The mayor makes committee and liaison assignments for council members, and most appointments are made by the mayor with the advice and consent of the council.

As of 2023, the mayor of Westwood is Republican Raymond Arroyo, whose term of office ends December 31, 2023. Members of the Westwood Borough Council are Council President Beth Dell (R, 2025), Robert Bicocchi (R, 2025), Erin Collins (D, 2023), Anthony Greco (R, 2024), Cheryl Hodges (R, 2024), and Christopher Montana (R, 2023).

In January 2020, Cheryl Hodges was selected from three candidates nominated by the Republican municipal committee to fill the seat expiring in December 2021 that became vacant when Raymond Arroyo took office as mayor; Hodges served on an interim basis until the November 2020 general election, when voters selected her to serve the balance of the term of office.

In May 2018, the borough council selected Alyssa Dawson from a list of three candidates nominated by the Republican municipal committee to fill the vacant seat of Peter Grefrath expiring in December 2018.

In September 2015, the borough council selected Beth Dell from a list of three candidates nominated by the Republican municipal committee to fill the vacant seat of Robert Miller expiring in December 2016. In announcing his resignation, Miller cited commitments to his family, and concerns about the impact of extended service by elected officials.

=== Federal, state and county representation ===
Westwood is located in the 5th Congressional District and is part of New Jersey's 39th state legislative district.

For the 119th United States Congress, New Jersey's 5th congressional district is represented by Josh Gottheimer (D, Wyckoff). New Jersey is represented in the United States Senate by Democrats Cory Booker (Newark, term ends 2027) and Andy Kim (Moorestown, term ends 2031).

For the 2026–2027 session, the 39th legislative district of the New Jersey Legislature is represented in the State Senate by Holly Schepisi (R, River Vale) and in the General Assembly by Robert Auth (R, Old Tappan) and John V. Azzariti (R, Saddle River).

Bergen County is governed by a directly elected County Executive, with legislative functions performed by a Board of County Commissioners comprised of seven members who are elected at-large to three-year terms in partisan elections on a staggered basis, with either two or three seats coming up for election each November; a Chairman and Vice Chairman are selected from among its seven members at a reorganization meeting held every January. As of 2025, the county executive is James J. Tedesco III (D, Paramus), whose four-year term of office ends December 31, 2026.

Bergen County's Commissioners are Chair Mary J. Amoroso (D, Mahwah, 2025), Vice Chair Steven A. Tanelli (D, North Arlington, 2027), Chair Pro Tem Joan Voss (D, Fort Lee, 2026), Rafael Marte (D, Bergenfield, 2026), Germaine M. Ortiz (D, Emerson, 2025), Thomas J. Sullivan Jr. (D, Montvale, 2025) and Tracy Silna Zur (D, Franklin Lakes, 2027).

Bergen County's elected constitutional officials are Clerk John S. Hogan (D, Northvale, 2026), Sheriff Anthony Cureton (D, Englewood, 2027) and Surrogate Michael R. Dressler (D, Cresskill, 2026).

=== Politics ===
As of March 2011, there were a total of 6,847 registered voters in Westwood, of which 1,805 (26.4% vs. 31.7% countywide) were registered as Democrats, 1,986 (29.0% vs. 21.1%) were registered as Republicans and 3,049 (44.5% vs. 47.1%) were registered as Unaffiliated. There were 7 voters registered as Libertarians or Greens. Among the borough's 2010 Census population, 62.8% (vs. 57.1% in Bergen County) were registered to vote, including 80.4% of those ages 18 and over (vs. 73.7% countywide).

Gubernatorial election results for Westwood
Year	Republican		Democratic		Third party(ies)	
Year	No.	%	No.	%	No.	%
2025	2,186	43.70%	2,793	55.84%	23	0.46%
2021	2,011	47.64%	2,184	51.74%	26	0.62%
2017	1,444	44.32%	1,750	53.71%	64	1.96%
2013	2,134	64.32%	1,150	34.66%	34	1.02%
2009	1,905	50.80%	1,608	42.88%	237	6.32%
2005	1,752	47.63%	1,823	49.56%	103	2.80%

In the 2016 presidential election, Democrat Hillary Clinton received 2,877 votes (50.6% vs. 54.8% countywide), ahead of Republican Donald Trump with 2,598 votes (45.7% vs. 41.6%) and other candidates with 214 votes (3.8% vs. 3.0%), among the 5,742 ballots cast by the borough's 7,517 registered voters, for a turnout of 76.4% (vs. 72.5% in Bergen County). In the 2012 presidential election, Democrat Barack Obama received 2,701 votes (50.4% vs. 54.8% countywide), ahead of Republican Mitt Romney with 2,564 votes (47.9% vs. 43.5%) and other candidates with 49 votes (0.9% vs. 0.9%), among the 5,355 ballots cast by the borough's 7,151 registered voters, for a turnout of 74.9% (vs. 70.4% in Bergen County). In the 2008 presidential election, Democrat Barack Obama received 2,915 votes (51.5% vs. 53.9% countywide), ahead of Republican John McCain with 2,657 votes (46.9% vs. 44.5%) and other candidates with 47 votes (0.8% vs. 0.8%), among the 5,664 ballots cast by the borough's 7,130 registered voters, for a turnout of 79.4% (vs. 76.8% in Bergen County). In the 2004 presidential election, Republican George W. Bush received 2,795 votes (51.4% vs. 47.2% countywide), ahead of Democrat John Kerry with 2,576 votes (47.4% vs. 51.7%) and other candidates with 47 votes (0.9% vs. 0.7%), among the 5,436 ballots cast by the borough's 6,837 registered voters, for a turnout of 79.5% (vs. 76.9% in the whole county).

United States presidential election results for Westwood 2024 2020 2016 2012 2008 2004
Year	Republican		Democratic		Third party(ies)	
Year	No.	%	No.	%	No.	%
2024	2,930	46.08%	3,335	52.45%	94	1.48%
2020	2,907	43.02%	3,762	55.68%	88	1.30%
2016	2,598	45.67%	2,877	50.57%	214	3.76%
2012	2,564	48.25%	2,701	50.83%	49	0.92%
2008	2,277	45.71%	2,657	53.34%	47	0.94%
2004	2,795	51.59%	2,576	47.55%	47	0.87%

In the 2013 gubernatorial election, Republican Chris Christie received 64.3% of the vote (2,134 cast), ahead of Democrat Barbara Buono with 34.7% (1,150 votes), and other candidates with 1.0% (34 votes), among the 3,404 ballots cast by the borough's 6,830 registered voters (86 ballots were spoiled), for a turnout of 49.8%.

United States Senate election results for Westwood1
Year	Republican		Democratic		Third party(ies)	
Year	No.	%	No.	%	No.	%
2024	2,769	45.84%	3,178	52.61%	94	1.56%
2018	2,032	46.76%	2,158	49.65%	156	3.59%
2012	2,305	46.92%	2,519	51.27%	89	1.81%
2006	1,871	52.16%	1,659	46.25%	57	1.59%

United States Senate election results for Westwood2
Year	Republican		Democratic		Third party(ies)	
Year	No.	%	No.	%	No.	%
2020	2,840	42.80%	3,677	55.42%	118	1.78%
2014	1,273	45.71%	1,474	52.93%	38	1.36%
2013	1,035	47.33%	1,139	52.08%	13	0.59%
2008	2,433	47.93%	2,568	50.59%	75	1.48%

== Emergency services ==
Westwood has a police department founded in September 1894, months after the borough was established, with the appointment by Mayor Bogert of two marshals; The first permanent officer was hired in 1921. The department is located in the municipal building.

Westwood has its own volunteer fire department. It was established in 1894. The station is home to Engine 12, Engine 1, Truck 1, Rescue 1, Utility 1, and Marine 1. The department responds to over 300 calls a year. It is located at 93 Center Ave. There is a chief, deputy chief, 2 captains and 4 lieutenants, approx. 60 regular firefighters, 10 probationary firemen, and 10 cadets led by a cadet captain.

Westwood also has a separate volunteer ambulance corps that was formed in 1935, located at borough hall.

== Education ==
Students in public school for kindergarten through twelfth grade attend the Westwood Regional School District, a comprehensive regional school district serving both Westwood and Washington Township. The district is the county's only regional district serving grades K-12. As of the 2023–24 school year, the district, comprised of six schools, had an enrollment of 2,828 students and 259.2 classroom teachers (on an FTE basis), for a student–teacher ratio of 10.9:1. Schools in the district (with 2023–24 enrollment data from the National Center for Education Statistics) are Berkeley Avenue Elementary School with 282 students in grades K–5, Brookside Elementary School with 375 students in grades K–5, Jessie F. George Elementary School with 283 students in grades K–5, Washington Elementary School with 322 students in grades K–5, Westwood Regional Middle School with 683 students in grades 6–8 and Westwood Regional High School with 839 students in grades 9–12. Seats on the nine-member board are allocated based on population of the constituent municipalities, with five allocated to Westwood and four to Washington Township.

Public school students from the borough, and all of Bergen County, are eligible to attend the secondary education programs offered by the Bergen County Technical Schools, which include the Bergen County Academies in Hackensack, and the Bergen Tech campus in Teterboro or Paramus. The district offers programs on a shared-time or full-time basis, with admission based on a selective application process and tuition covered by the student's home school district.

Zion Lutheran School, adjacent the Zion Lutheran church founded in 1905, is a pre-primary school for children 2-1/2 to 4 years old.

== Infrastructure ==
=== Transportation ===
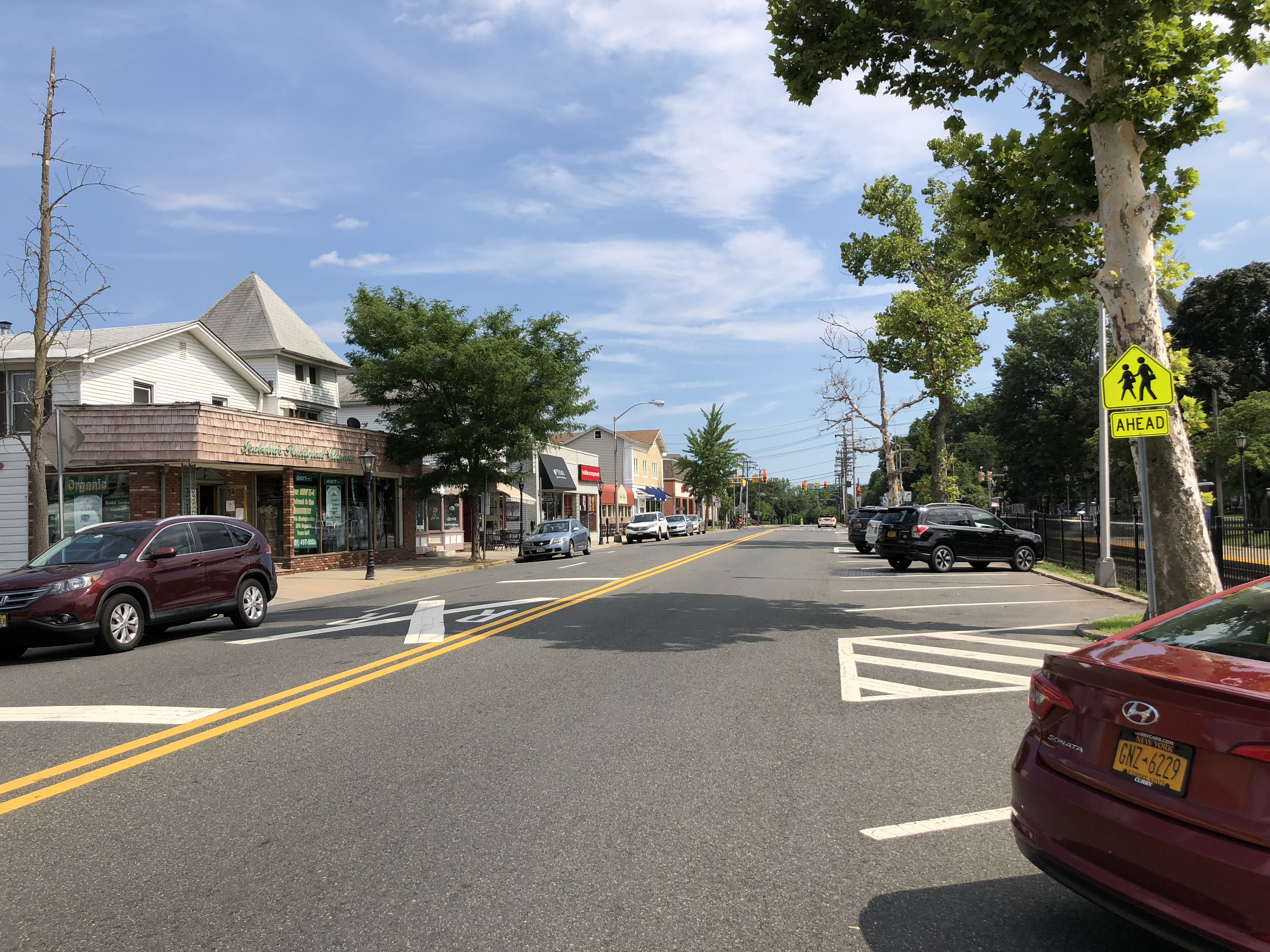
View east along County Route 502 in central Westwood

==== Roads and highways ====
As of May 2010, the borough had a total of 39.29 miles (63.23 km) of roadways, of which 31.23 miles (50.26 km) were maintained by the municipality and 8.06 miles (12.97 km) by Bergen County.

The most significant roads passing directly through Westwood are County Route 503 (Kinderkamack Road) and County Route 502. The closest limited-access highway is the Garden State Parkway in neighboring Washington Township, where Exit 168 links CR 502 to the borough.

==== Public transportation ====
Westwood is served by NJ Transit at the Westwood train station, located at Broadway and Westwood Avenue. The Pascack Valley Line runs north–south to Hoboken Terminal with connections via the Secaucus Junction transfer station to New York Penn Station and to other NJ Transit rail service. Connections are available at Hoboken Terminal to other NJ Transit rail lines, the PATH train at the Hoboken PATH station, New York Waterways ferry service to the World Financial Center and other destinations and Hudson-Bergen Light Rail service.

NJ Transit bus route 165 serves Westwood with service to the Port Authority Bus Terminal in Midtown Manhattan. Westwood is the terminus for bus route 165.

Rockland Coaches offers service to the Port Authority Bus Terminal on routes 11 and 47.

=== Healthcare ===
Pascack Valley Hospital (PVH), a 291-bed hospital located at 250 Old Hook Road, filed for bankruptcy on September 24, 2007, and shut down on November 21, 2007. On October 1, 2008, Hackensack University Medical Center opened Hackensack University Medical Center at Pascack Valley as a satellite emergency department. As of 2013, the facility has been expanded to include 128 patient beds, all in single rooms.

== Shopping and entertainment ==
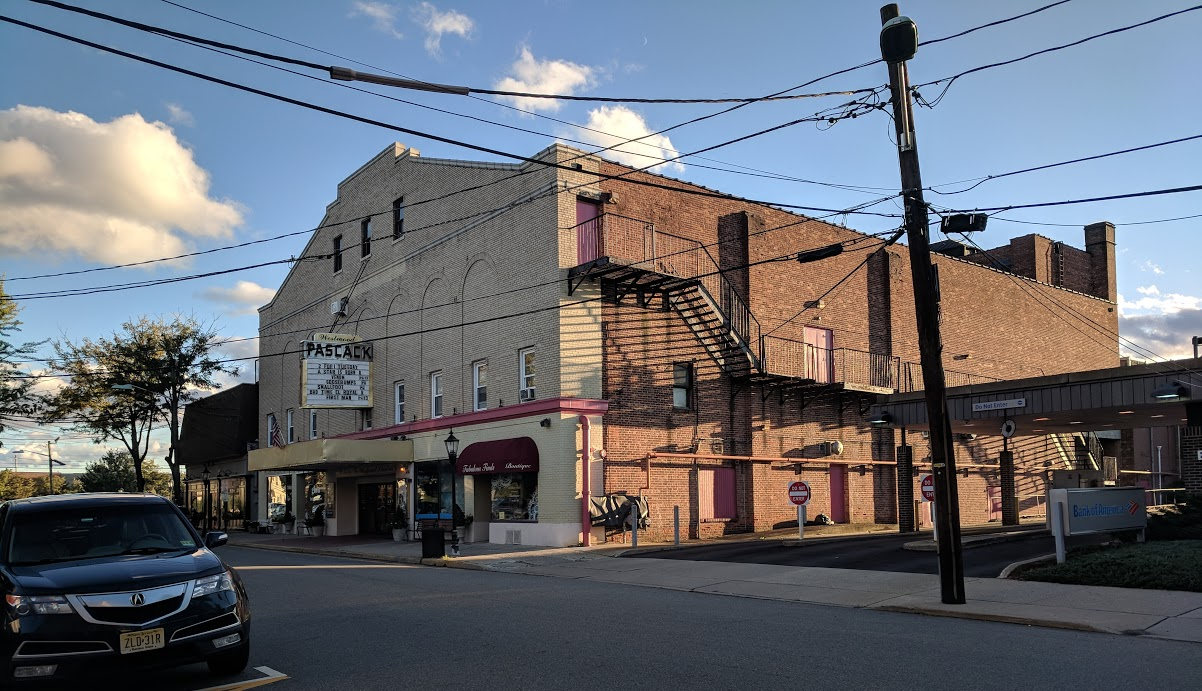
Originally opened in 1928 as the 1,275-seat Pascack Theater, the Westwood Cinema now has nine screens showing first-run movies.

Downtown Westwood is a regional hub that offers many options for shopping and dining. The Westwood Plaza is an outdoor shopping mall that had a Kmart and other stores and restaurants. The Westwood location was one of the last three operating Kmart stores in the United States and was the last location in the state until it closed in 2023. Westwood has a movie theater located on Center Avenue that is open seven days a week until midnight.

The Fritz Deitl Ice Rink, which opened in 1958, was home to AM3 Hockey Academy and offered open ice sessions, figure skating lessons, skating school, birthday party rentals, and Stick Time open hockey.

Every Saturday, from May through November, there is a Farmer's Market held in the parking lot of the Knights of Columbus on Crest Street.

In the summer, there are multiple concerts in the park where anyone can bring chairs or blankets, and watch the movie projected on the back of the train station.

Westwood also has a Community Center that is home to the Recreation Department where children and adults can get participate in sports and other activities.

== Annual events ==
Each December, Westwood holds its own holiday parade called "Home for the Holidays". Participants of the parade include The Westwood Regional High School Marching Band, The Park Ridge High School marching band, The Emerson High School marching band, and many more. The parade ends with Santa Claus riding on top of one of the fire trucks. Afterwards, there is a tree and candle lighting with hot foods included.

Downtown Westwood has a sidewalk sale held every summer. People can shop indoors or outdoors during this event. There are also fun activities and games included.

== Notable people ==
People who were born in, residents of, or otherwise closely associated with Westwood include:

- Warren Bennis (1925–2014), scholar, organizational consultant and author, widely regarded as a pioneer of the contemporary field of leadership studies
- F. Herbert Bormann (1922–2012), scientist who helped discover the ecological impact of acid rain
- Rob Delaney (born 1984), Major League Baseball pitcher who plays for the Minnesota Twins and Tampa Bay Rays
- Russell Dermond (1936–2015), sprint canoer who competed in the 1956 and 1960 Olympics
- Robert Dow (born 1945), fencer who competed in the team sabre event at the 1972 Summer Olympics
- James Gandolfini (1961–2013), actor known for playing Tony Soprano on HBO's The Sopranos, raised in nearby Park Ridge
- Jason Knapp (born 1990), professional baseball pitcher
- Graig Kreindler (born 1980), painter and illustrator
- Tommy La Stella (born 1989), former MLB second baseman who played for the Atlanta Braves, Chicago Cubs, Los Angeles Angels, Oakland Athletics, San Francisco Giants and the Seattle Mariners
- Robert Sean Leonard (born 1969), actor best known for his roles in House and Dead Poets Society
- Vicente Luque (born 1991), mixed martial artist who competes in Ultimate Fighting Championship as a welterweight
- Harold Medina (1888–1990), lawyer, teacher and judge who is most noted for hearing landmark cases of conspiracy and treason
- Carlotta Monterey (1888–1970), stage and film actress who was the third and final wife of playwright Eugene O'Neill
- James O'Keefe (born 1984), journalist, activist-filmmaker who targeted ACORN
- Jeffrey B. Perry (1946–2022), independent scholar, historian and labor activist
- Jeff Phillips (born 1968), fitness trainer and former actor best known for his work in Guiding Light, As the World Turns and the 1996 film Independence Day
- Elizabeth Randall (born 1954), former Bergen County Clerk and former member of the New Jersey General Assembly
- Harry Randall Jr. (1927–2013), politician who served in the New Jersey General Assembly from 1962 to 1966 and from 1968 to 1970, after which he served as a member of the Bergen County Board of Chosen Freeholders
- Katie Sagona (born 1989), model and actress who appeared in You've Got Mail and Grumpier Old Men
- Kevin Sampson (born 1981), tackle who played in the NFL for the Kansas City Chiefs
- Frank Saul (1924–2019), National Basketball Association player
- Kyle Scatliffe (born 1986), stage actor best known for playing Enjolras in the 2014 Broadway revival of Les Misérables, and Harpo in the 2015 Broadway Revival of The Color Purple

== See also ==
- Cunningham v. Cunningham (1912)

== Sources ==
- Municipal Incorporations of the State of New Jersey (according to Counties) prepared by the Division of Local Government, Department of the Treasury (New Jersey); December 1, 1958.
- Clayton, W. Woodford; and Nelson, William. History of Bergen and Passaic Counties, New Jersey, with Biographical Sketches of Many of its Pioneers and Prominent Men., Philadelphia: Everts and Peck, 1882.
- Harvey, Cornelius Burnham (ed.), Genealogical History of Hudson and Bergen Counties, New Jersey. New York: New Jersey Genealogical Publishing Co., 1900.
- Pelegrino, Michael. Westwood, Images of America Series, Arcadia Publishing, 2004. ISBN 9780738536590
- Van Valen, James M. History of Bergen County, New Jersey. New York: New Jersey Publishing and Engraving Co., 1900.
- Westervelt, Frances A. (Frances Augusta), 1858–1942, History of Bergen County, New Jersey, 1630–1923, Lewis Historical Publishing Company, 1923.
