= Children's Hospital Association =

Organization of children's hospitals

- Headquarters: Washington, D.C., Lenexa, Kansas, United States
- Key people: Matt Cook CEO
- Number of employees: 150
- Website: www.childrenshospitals.org

The Children's Hospital Association (CHA), is an organization of children's hospitals with more than 200 members in the United States, Australia, Canada, Italy, Mexico and Puerto Rico.

CHA has offices located in Lenexa, Kansas and Washington, D.C.

== Mission ==
The Association promotes the health and well-being of all children and their families through support of children's hospitals and health systems for children. CHA works to ensure all children's access to health care and children's hospitals' continuing ability to provide services needed by children. CHA coordinates federal advocacy on behalf of their member hospitals, as well as provides a variety of services including quality improvement, data analytics and insurance services.
