= Touro =

Touro may refer to:

== People ==
- Isaac Touro (1738–1783), a Jewish leader in colonial America.
- Judah Touro (1775–1854), a Jewish leader in colonial America and son of Isaac Touro.

== Institutions ==
- Touro Synagogue, the oldest Synagogue in the United States, located in Newport, Rhode Island.
- Touro Synagogue (New Orleans), a synagogue in New Orleans
- Touro College, an Orthodox Jewish college in New York City.
  - Touro College Jacob D. Fuchsberg Law Center, a law school in Central Islip, New York.
  - Touro College of Osteopathic Medicine, a medical school in Harlem, New York
  - Touro University College of Medicine, a proposed medical school in Hackensack, New Jersey
  - Touro University, a division of Touro College
    - Touro University California, a medical, pharmacy and physician assistant's school in Vallejo, California.
    - Touro University Nevada, a medical, pharmacy and nursing school in Henderson, Nevada.
    - Touro University Rome, a Business and Management school in Zagarolo, Italy.
- Touro Infirmary, a hospital in New Orleans, Louisiana

== Locations ==
- Touro, Spain, a municipality in Galicia, A Coruña, Spain
- Touro, New Orleans, Louisiana, United States, a neighborhood
- Touro, Póvoa de Varzim, Portugal, a square and a monument

== Other uses ==
- Touro (HGST), family of HGST cloud storage backup products.
