= Touro Cemetery =

Jewish cemetery in Newport, Rhode Island, United States

Coordinates: 41.4879°N 71.3093°W

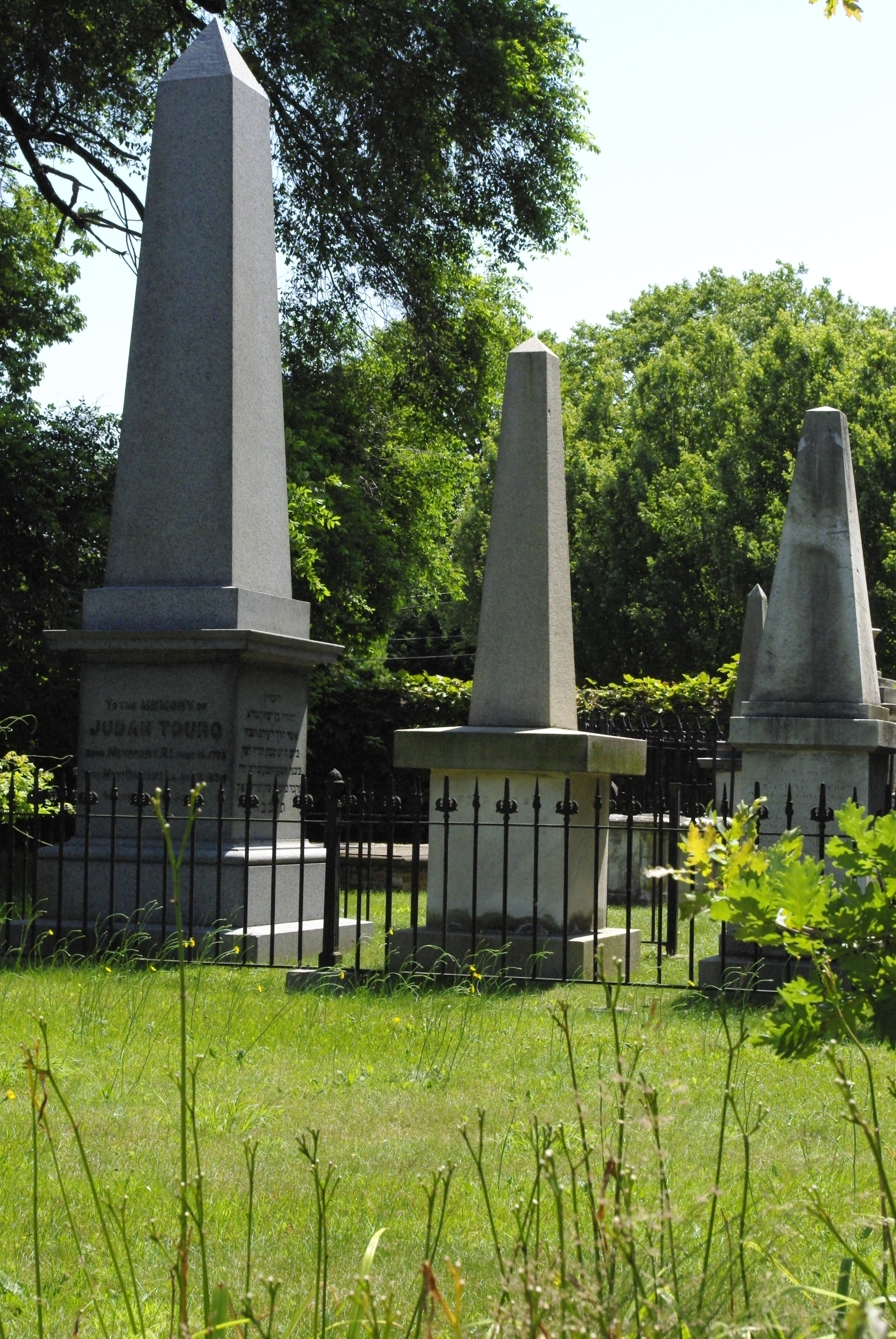
- Judah Touro's Tomb in Newport Jewish Cemetery
- Interactive map of Touro Cemetery

Details
- Established: 1677
- Type: Jewish

Touro Synagogue Cemetery (also known as the Jewish Cemetery at Newport), dedicated in 1677, is located in the colonial historic district of Newport, Rhode Island, not far from the Touro Synagogue. Other Jewish graves are found nearby as part of the Common Burying Ground and Island Cemetery on Farewell Street.

The gated Touro Cemetery is at present opened to the public only once per year.

== History ==
The cemetery was founded in 1677 or possibly earlier. In the Newport land records, a deed was recorded on 28 Feb 1677 for a certain parcel of land, 30 feet square, sold by Nathaniel Dickens to Mordecai Campannall and Moses Packechoe for a burial-place for the Jews of Newport, and this purchase may have been an addition to a cemetery that was already in existence as of that date.

The synagogue is the oldest surviving synagogue building in the United States, and the cemetery is the second oldest Jewish cemetery in the country. The cemetery gates are decorated with torches turned to face downward, an acknowledgement of the ending of life's flame. Prior to the establishment of Temple Ohabei Shalom Cemetery in Boston in 1844, Jews from Massachusetts were sent to the Touro Synagogue Cemetery, the West Indies, or Europe for burial in sacred ground.

Judah Touro, a philanthropist who was born and reared in Newport, contributed $40,000, an immense sum at the time, to the Jewish cemetery at Newport. This funded the restoration and maintenance of the cemetery. He is buried in the Jewish cemetery of Newport. The inscription on his tombstone reads: "To the Memory of / Judah Touro / He inscribed it in the Book of / Philanthropy / To be remembered forever."

The cemetery's Egyptian revival gate and fence were designed by Boston architect Isaiah Rogers (1810–49) who designed an identical gate for Boston's Old Granary Burying Ground. There are 42 known burial sites within the cemetery, with the oldest belonging to Boston man Joseph Frazon in 1704 and the most recent known addition marking the grave of infant Edwina Rosenstein in 1866.

By the mid-19th century, the maritime prosperity that built Newport's fine colonial churches, synagogue, public buildings and homes had vanished when the port of Providence superseded Newport after the British destroyed Newport's wharves during the American Revolution. The great mansions of Newport in the Gilded Age were still in the future. Newport in the 1850s was an old seaport town whose air of genteel decay and cool sea breezes had recently begun to attract members of Boston's intellectual elite as a summer retreat. There were virtually no Jews in Newport in this period; the synagogue was shuttered.

American writer Henry Wadsworth Longfellow visited the area in July 1852 and showed an interest more in the cemetery than in the synagogue, which he described as being "a shady nook, at the corner of two dusty, frequented streets". Longfellow was inspired to write his poem "The Jewish Cemetery at Newport" during this visit. Longfellow, a scholar who knew Hebrew, begins his poem by expressing his surprise at coming upon a synagogue in an old New England port town, due to the dearth of Jews in New England during that time and the Colonial era.

The American Jewish poet Emma Lazarus wrote a sort of redux of Longfellow's poem in 1867 titled, "In the Jewish Synagogue at Newport". Some interpreters contend that Lazarus intended with her poem to let Longfellow know that the Jews might be down, but that they were not dead. However, this interpretation matches neither the mournful tone nor the explicit references to the defunct nature of the Newport synagogue, such as "no signs of life", and the general reference to Hebrew as "a language dead", not to mention the concluding line referring to "the mystery of death". In this latter interpretation, Lazarus was concurring with Longfellow regarding the sanctity of Jewish memory while acknowledging the unlikelihood of a Jewish national revival, which really only blossomed in the decade following the deaths of Longfellow and Lazarus.

The German-American poet Minna Kleeberg also wrote a riposte to Longfellow in a poem she also titled "The Jewish Cemetery at Newport," published in her Gedichte of 1877. She explicitly states that she hopes to forgive Longfellow's last stanza, about dead races that will rise no more, writing:
"I cannot bear to watch my child, my people, die!" —
It was not Hagar who cried it — thus spoke a God;
And from the dead He let arise
The tribe that was only bowed, never broken.
The spring of love flows now unchangingly,
And one asylum has freedom already on earth;
In the land of freedom, here shall grow strong and great
The new Ishmael of humanity!"

== Notable burials ==
- Judah Touro, philanthropist
- Aaron Lopez, Portuguese Jewish merchant and philanthropist

== Gallery ==
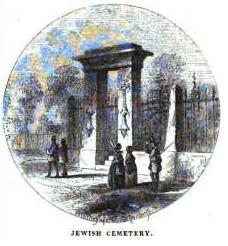
Touro Cemetery, pictured in ca. 1850

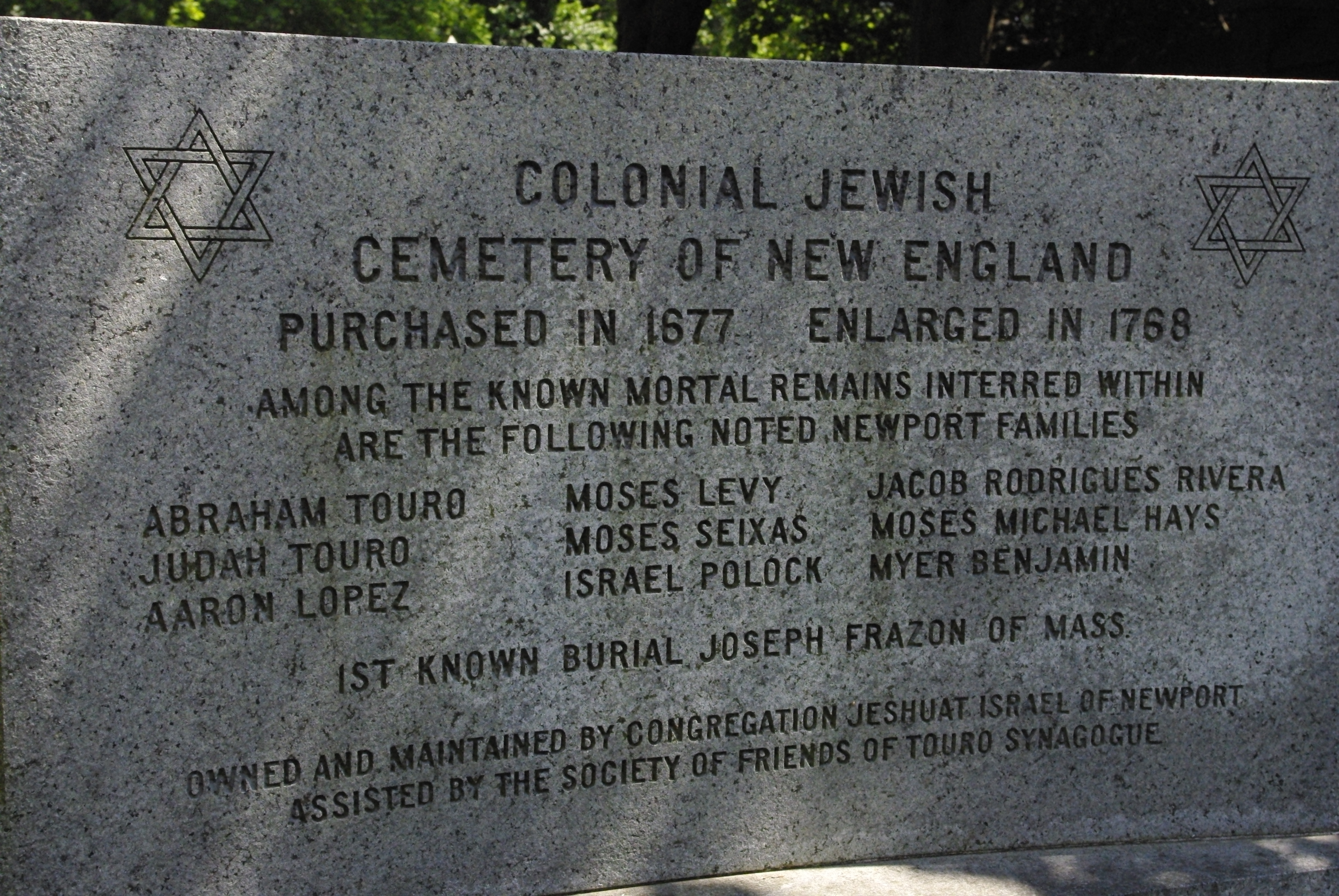
Newport Jewish Cemetery entrance plate

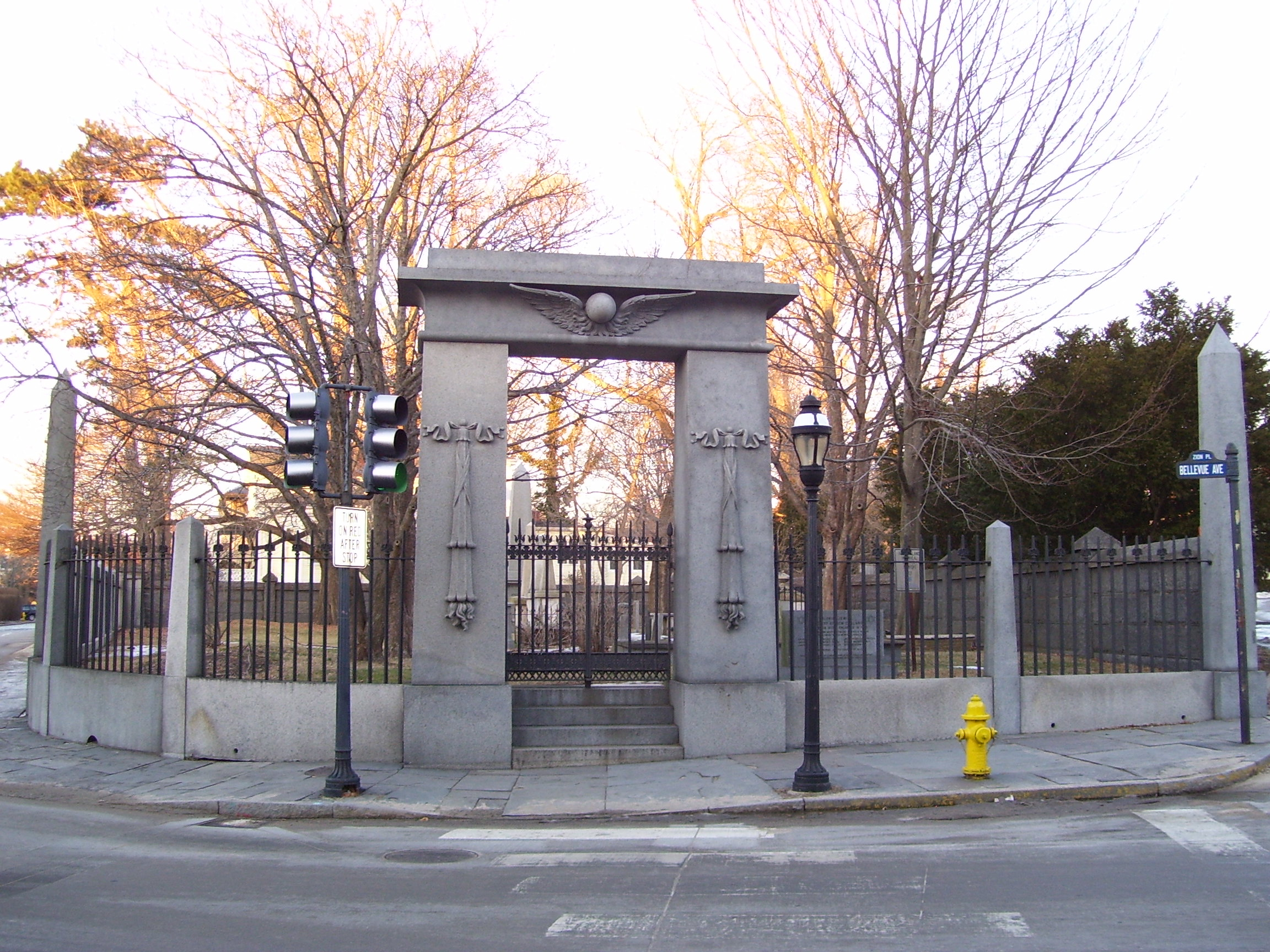
Touro Cemetery showing Isaiah Rogers' Egyptian Revival gate similar to the gate at Boston's Old Granary Burying Ground

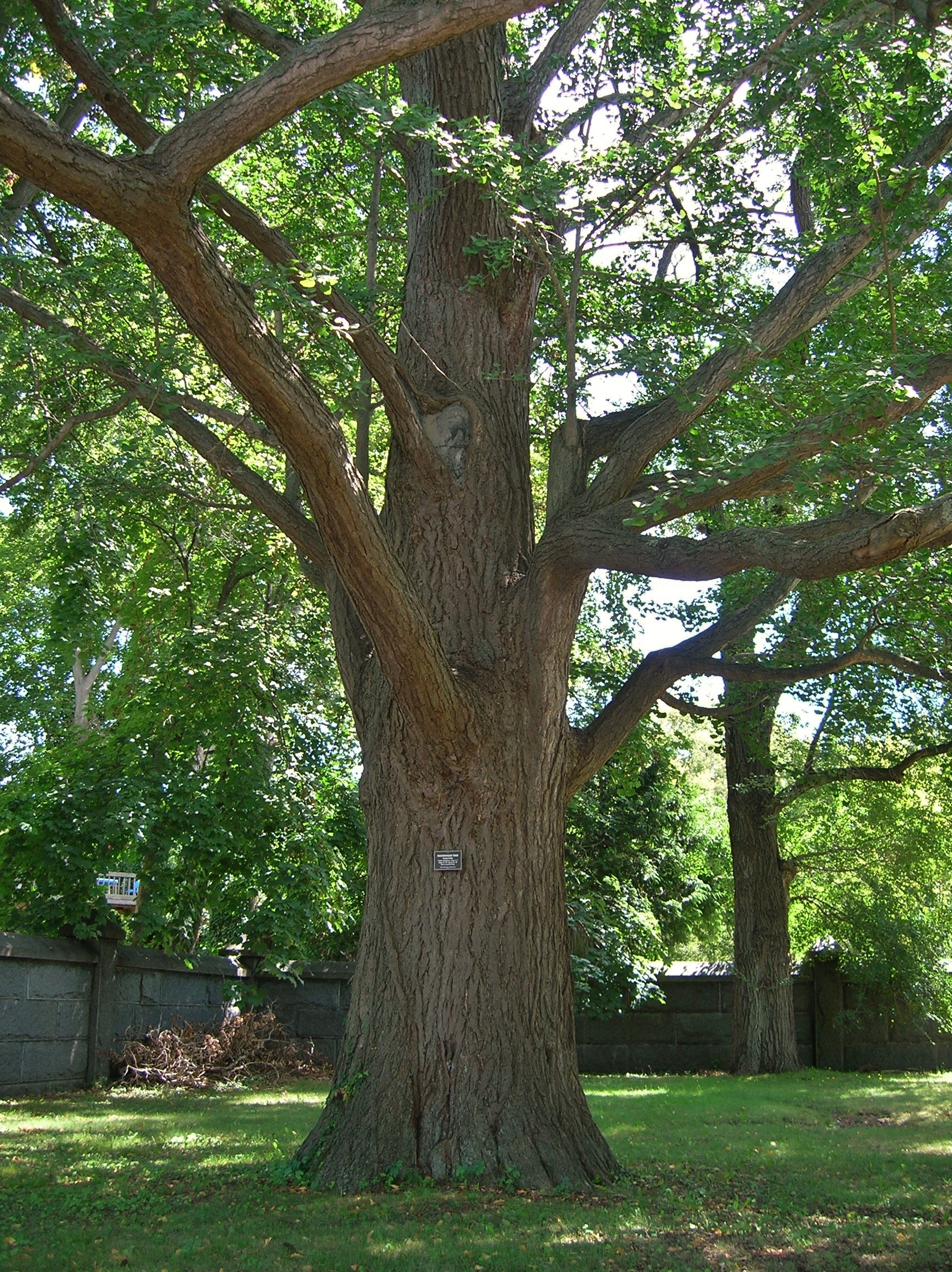
Ginkgo tree in Touro Cemetery, August 2015

== See also ==
- Touro Synagogue
- Judah Touro
- List of cemeteries in Rhode Island
