= List of cemeteries in Rhode Island =

This list of cemeteries in Rhode Island includes currently operating, historical (closed for new interments), and defunct (graves abandoned or removed) cemeteries, columbaria, and mausolea which are historical and/or notable. It does not include pet cemeteries.

== Bristol County ==
- DeWolf Cemetery, Bristol
- Juniper Hill Cemetery, Bristol; NRHP-listed
- Prince's Hill Cemetery, Barrington Civic Center Historic District, Bristol; NRHP-listed

== Kent County ==
- Governor Greene Cemetery, Warwick
- St. Mary's Church and Cemetery, Crompton, West Warwick; NRHP-listed
- West Greenwich Baptist Church and Cemetery, West Greenwich; NRHP-listed

== Newport County ==
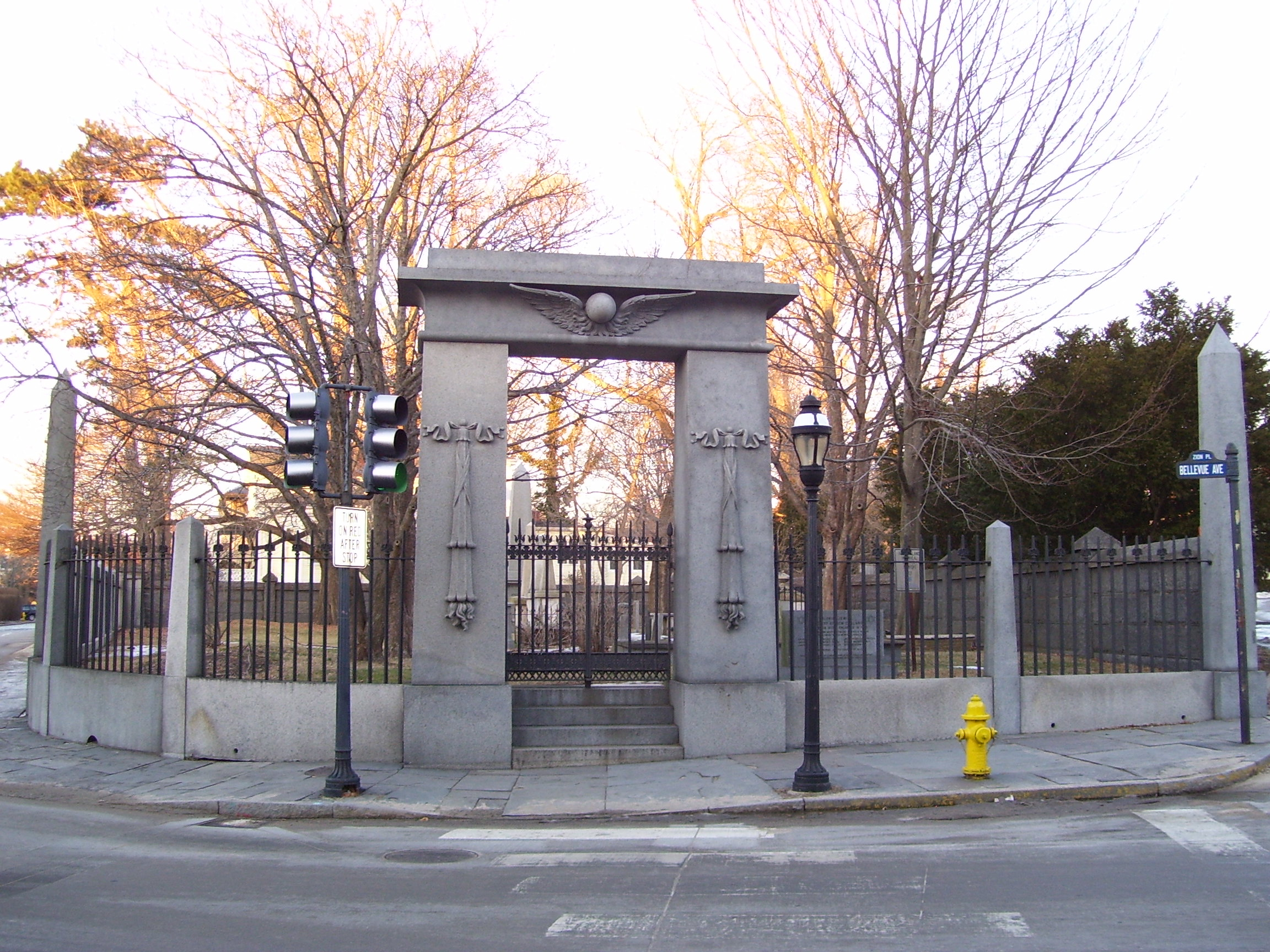
Touro Cemetery showing Isaiah Rogers' Egyptian Revival gate, in the colonial historic district of Newport in Newport County

- Arnold Burying Ground, Newport
- Artillery Park, Jamestown; NRHP-listed (also known as Churchyard Cemetery, and Historical Cemetery 2)
- Clifton Burying Ground, Newport
- Coddington Cemetery, Newport
- Common Burying Ground and Island Cemetery, Newport; NRHP-listed
- Friends Meeting House and Cemetery, Little Compton; NRHP-listed
- Old Burying Ground at Little Compton Common Historic District, Little Compton; NRHP-listed
- Newport Memorial Park Cemetery, Middletown
- Old Friends' Burial Ground at Friends Meetinghouse, Jamestown; NRHP-listed
- Portsmouth Friends Meetinghouse, Parsonage and Cemetery, Portsmouth; NRHP-listed
- Touro Cemetery, Newport; NRHP-listed (also known as Jewish Cemetery at Newport)

== Providence County ==
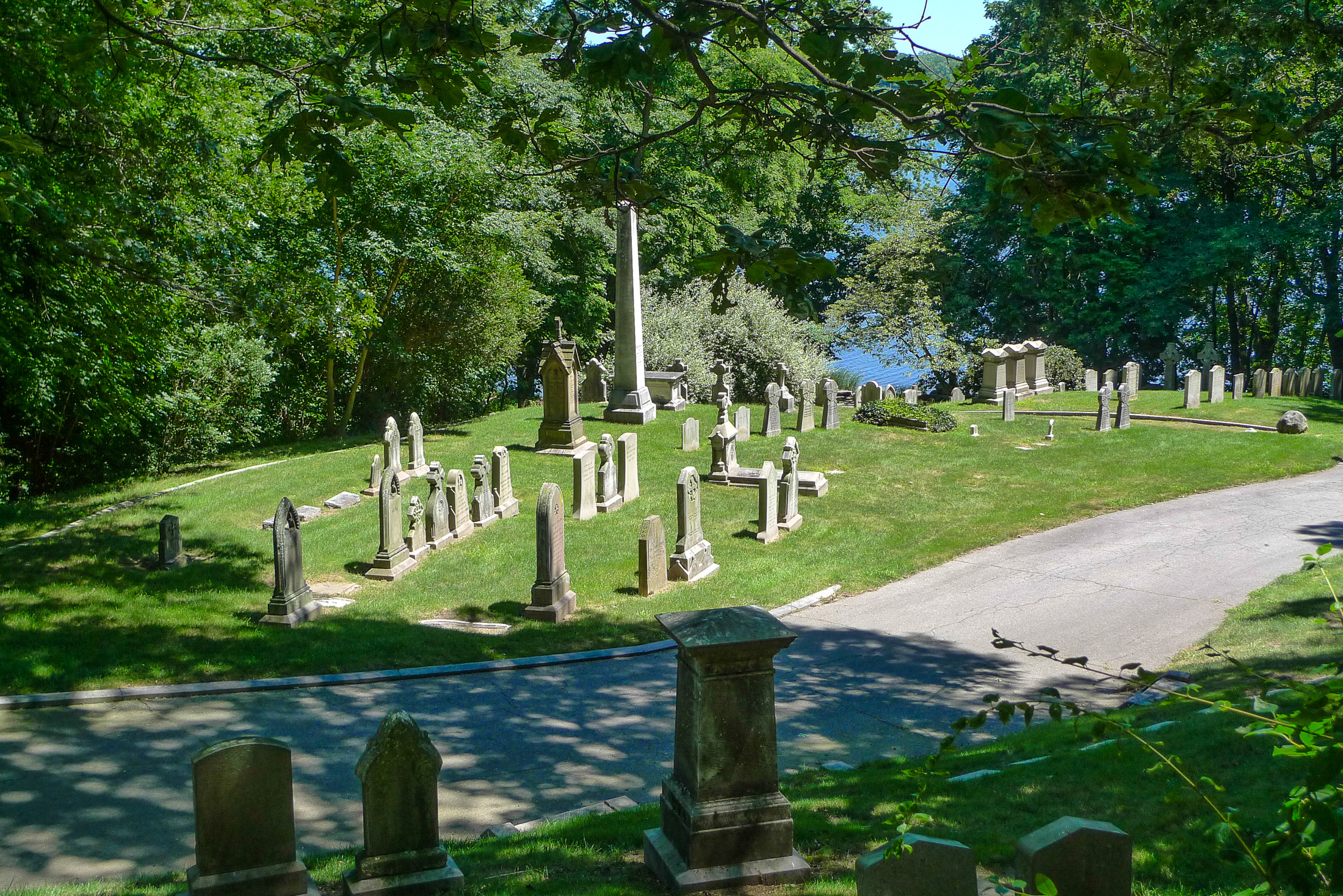
Swan Point Cemetery, Providence

- Carpenter, Lakeside, and Springvale Cemeteries, East Providence; NRHP-listed
- Harmony Chapel and Cemetery, Harmony; NRHP-listed
- L'Eglise du Precieux Sang cemetery, Woonsocket; NRHP-listed
- Little Neck Cemetery, East Providence; NRHP-listed
- McGonagle Site, RI-1227 cemetery, Scituate; NRHP-listed
- Newman Cemetery, East Providence; NRHP-listed
- North Burial Ground, Providence; NRHP-listed
- Riverside Cemetery, Pawtucket; NRHP-listed
- Smithfield Friends Meeting House, Parsonage and Cemetery, Woonsocket; NRHP-listed
- Swan Point Cemetery, Providence; NRHP-listed

== Washington County ==
- Casey Farm, Saunderstown; NRHP-listed
- Chestnut Hill Baptist Church and Cemetery, Exeter; NRHP-listed (also known as Baptist Church in Exeter)
- Devil's Foot Cemetery Archeological Site, RI-694, North Kingstown; NRHP-listed
- Indian Burial Ground, Charlestown; NRHP-listed
- Old Narragansett Church, Wickford; NRHP-listed

== See also ==
- List of cemeteries in the United States
