= Artillery Park =

Historic cemetery in Newport County, Rhode Island

- U.S. National Register of Historic Places
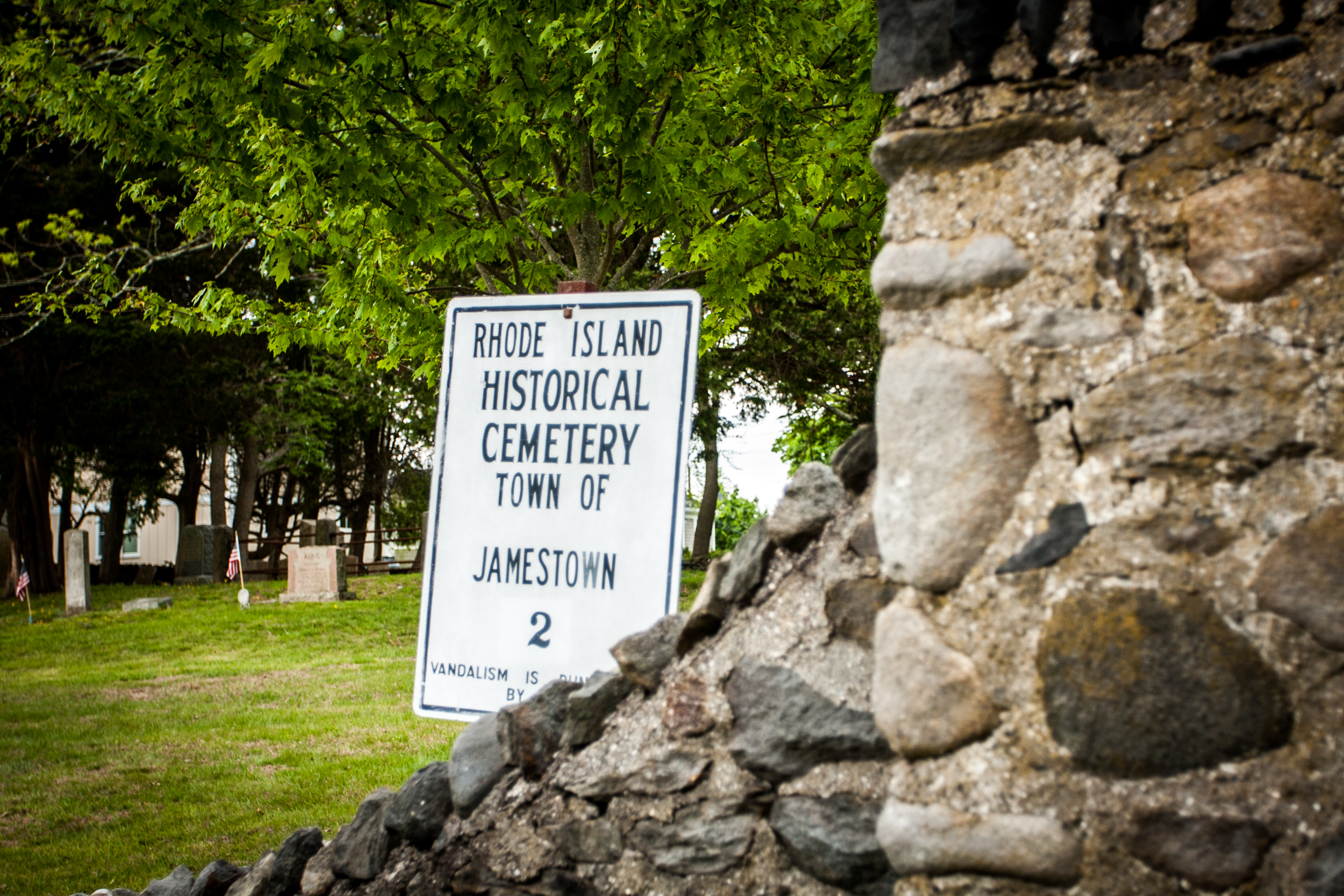

- Location within Rhode Island Location within the United States
- Location: Jamestown, Rhode Island
- Coordinates: 41°29′47″N 71°22′29″W
- Built: 1656
- NRHP reference No.: 73000054
- Added to NRHP: March 7, 1973

The Artillery Park (also known as the Churchyard Cemetery and Historical Cemetery 2) is a historic cemetery at North Road and Narragansett Avenue in Jamestown, Rhode Island. It is located at a high point on the southern part of Conanicut Island. The cemetery was listed on the National Register of Historic Places in 1973.

== History ==
It was originally laid out in 1656 as a burying ground and militia training ground, but appears to have been used as a burying ground only since the 1740s. When British forces occupied the island in 1776, there was a brief skirmish there, and the British afterward used the area as a military staging ground.

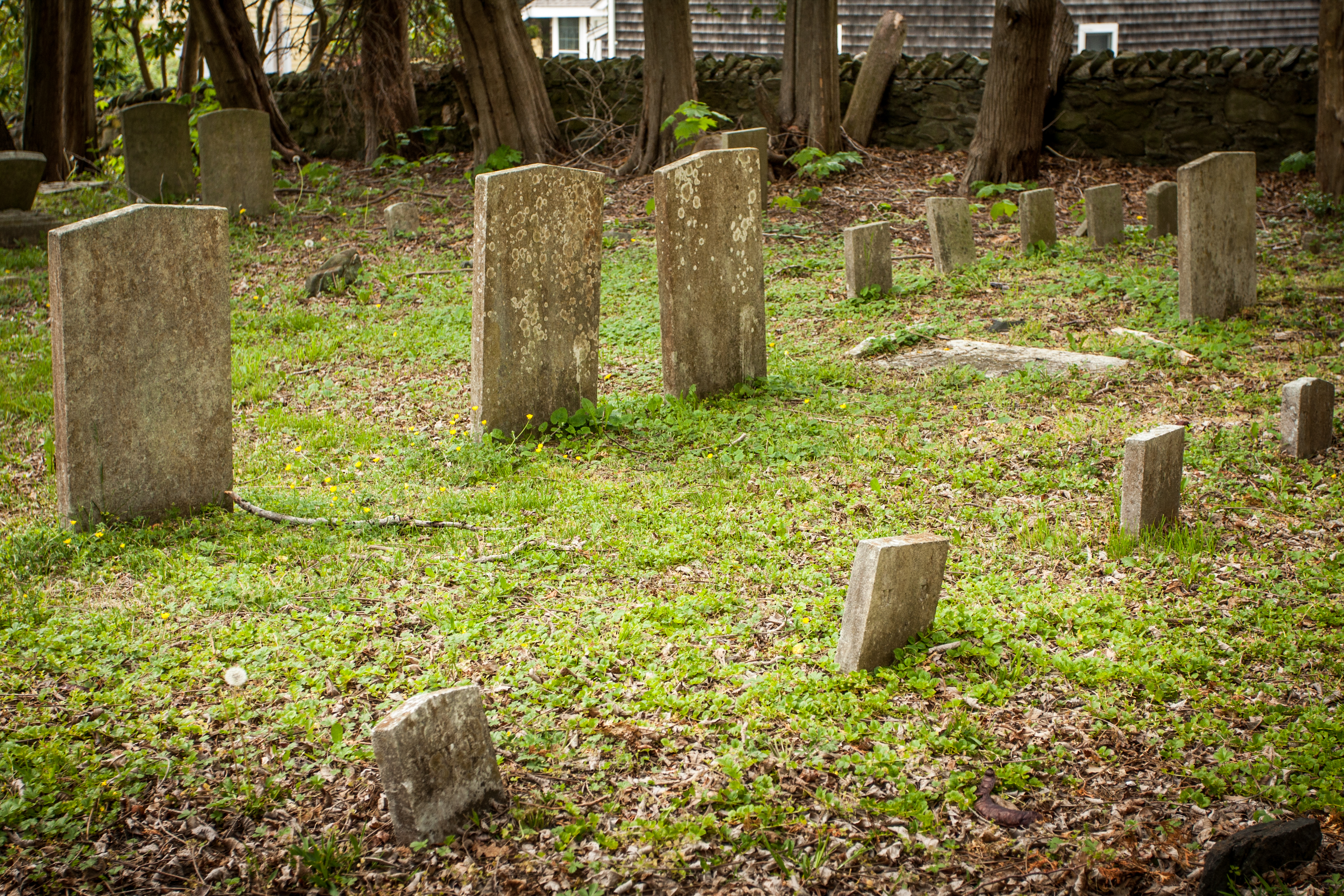
Old section of the cemetery

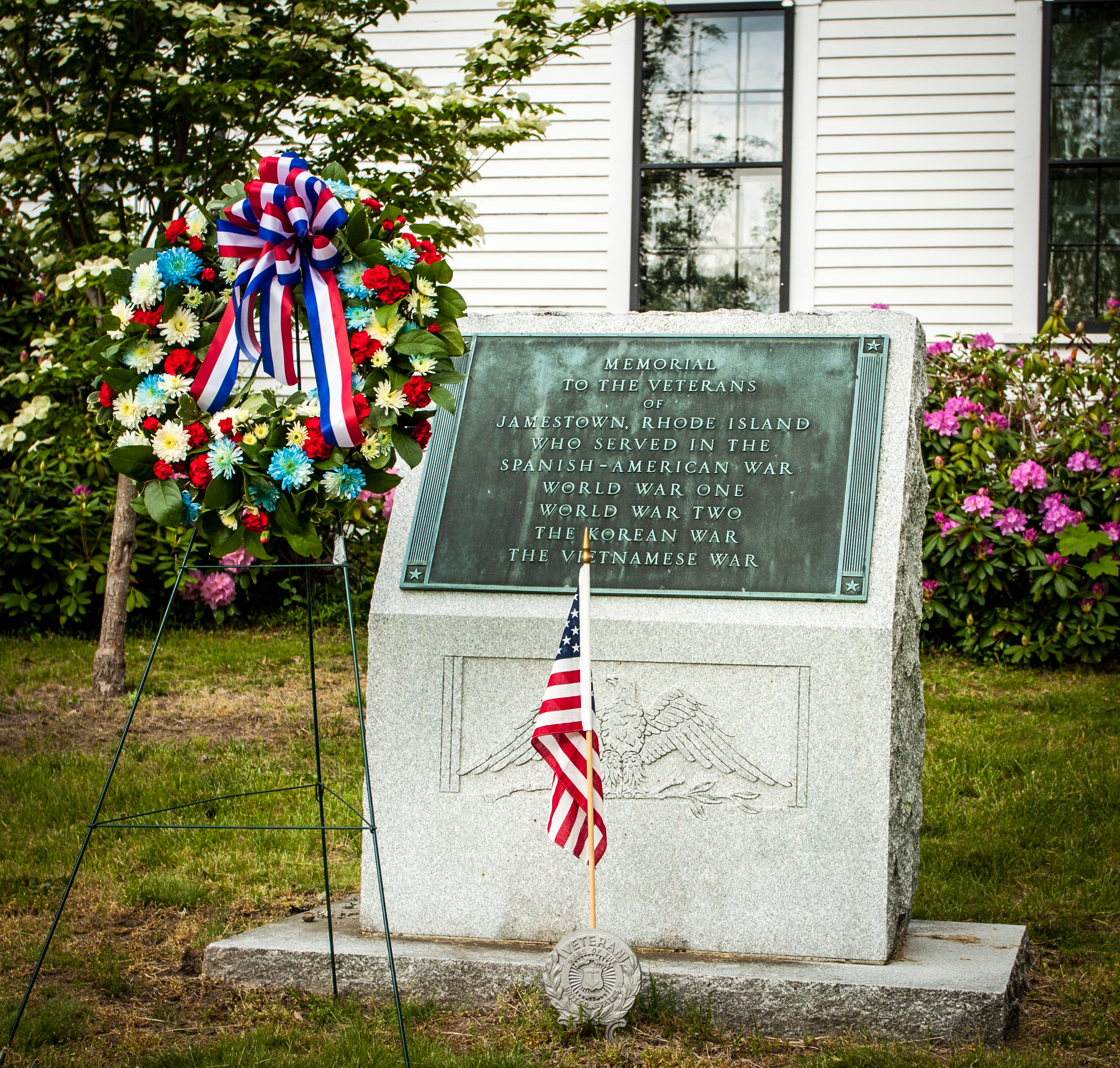
Memorial to veterans of Jamestown, RI

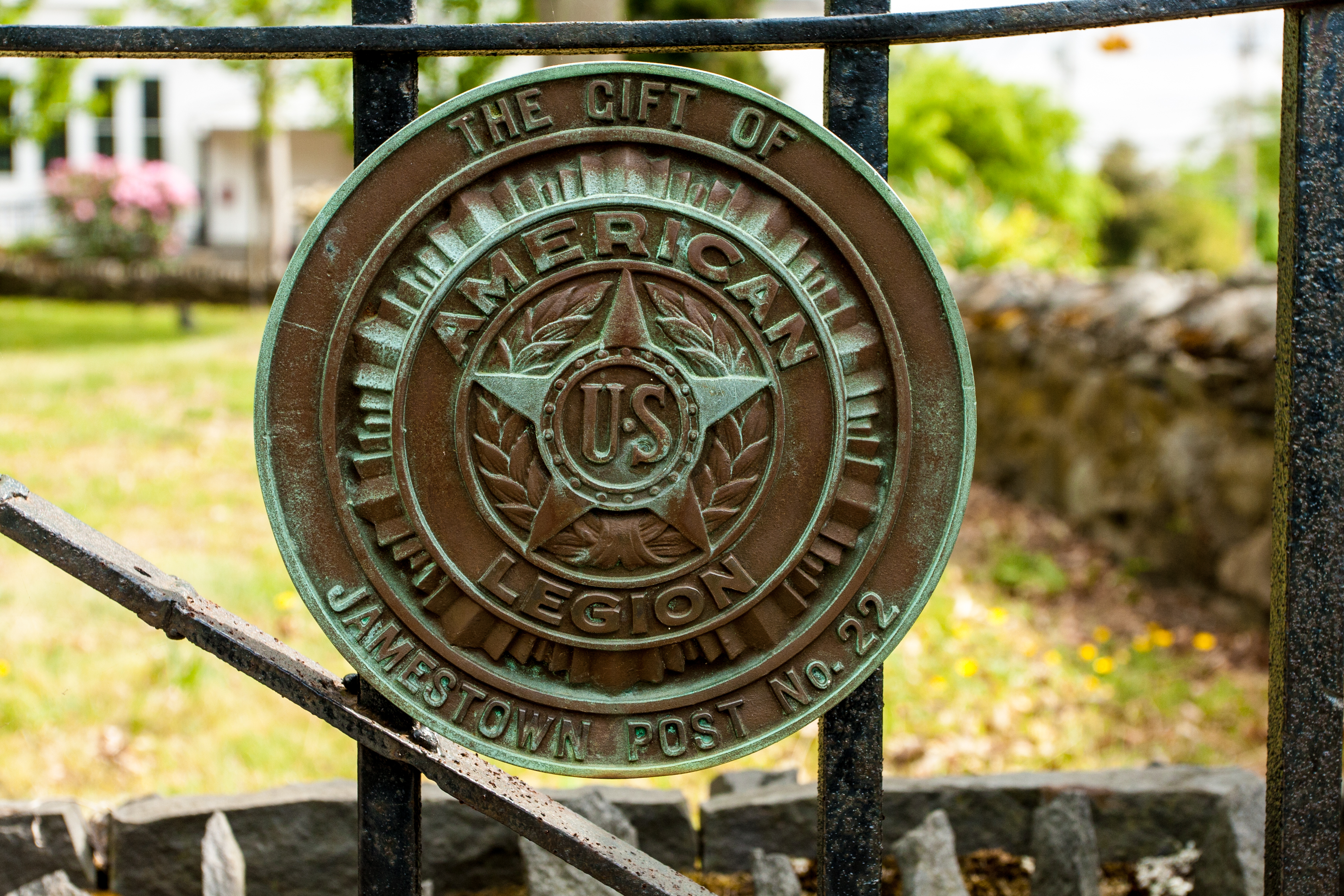
American Legion insignia on gate of cemetery

== See also ==
- National Register of Historic Places listings in Newport County, Rhode Island
- List of cemeteries in Rhode Island
