= Theodore Clapp =

American minister

Theodore Clapp (March 29, 1792 – April 17, 1866) was an American minister.

Clapp was born in Easthampton, Massachusetts, March 29, 1792.

He graduated from Yale College in 1814. He was for one year, 1818–19, a student in Andover Theological Seminary. In 1822, he became pastor of the First Presbyterian Church of New Orleans in which relation he continued till 1834, when having adopted Unitarian views, his connection with the Presbyterian Church was dissolved. He continued, however, to preach in the same church edifice, which had in the meantime become the property of a wealthy Jewish philanthropist, Judah Touro, a personal friend of Clapp, and to a congregation composed in part of his former parishioners. Clapp possessed great power as a pulpit orator, and by his devotion to the sick on repeated occasions when the city was visited by epidemics, endeared himself to all classes of the population.

He was made President of Orleans College in 1824, but did not last long in the post as it closed soon thereafter.

Clapp publicly defended the institution of slavery, but by 1849 he had come to see it as sinful. He opposed abolitionism, however, on the grounds that he saw no precedent in the New Testament for such political action.

Clapp served on the board of trustees of the Medical College of Louisiana, which was to become The Tulane University School of Medicine.

In 1847, he travelled in Europe, and in 1857, his health failing, and his church having been burned, he resigned his pastorate. He published in 1858, a volume of Autobiographical Sketches and Recollections of a 35 years' residence in New Orleans. The last nine years of his life were spent, chiefly in retirement, in Louisville, Kentucky. He died there on April 17, 1866, aged 74 years. He left a widow and two children.
