= Touro Synagogue (New Orleans) =

Reform synagogue in New Orleans, Louisiana, United States

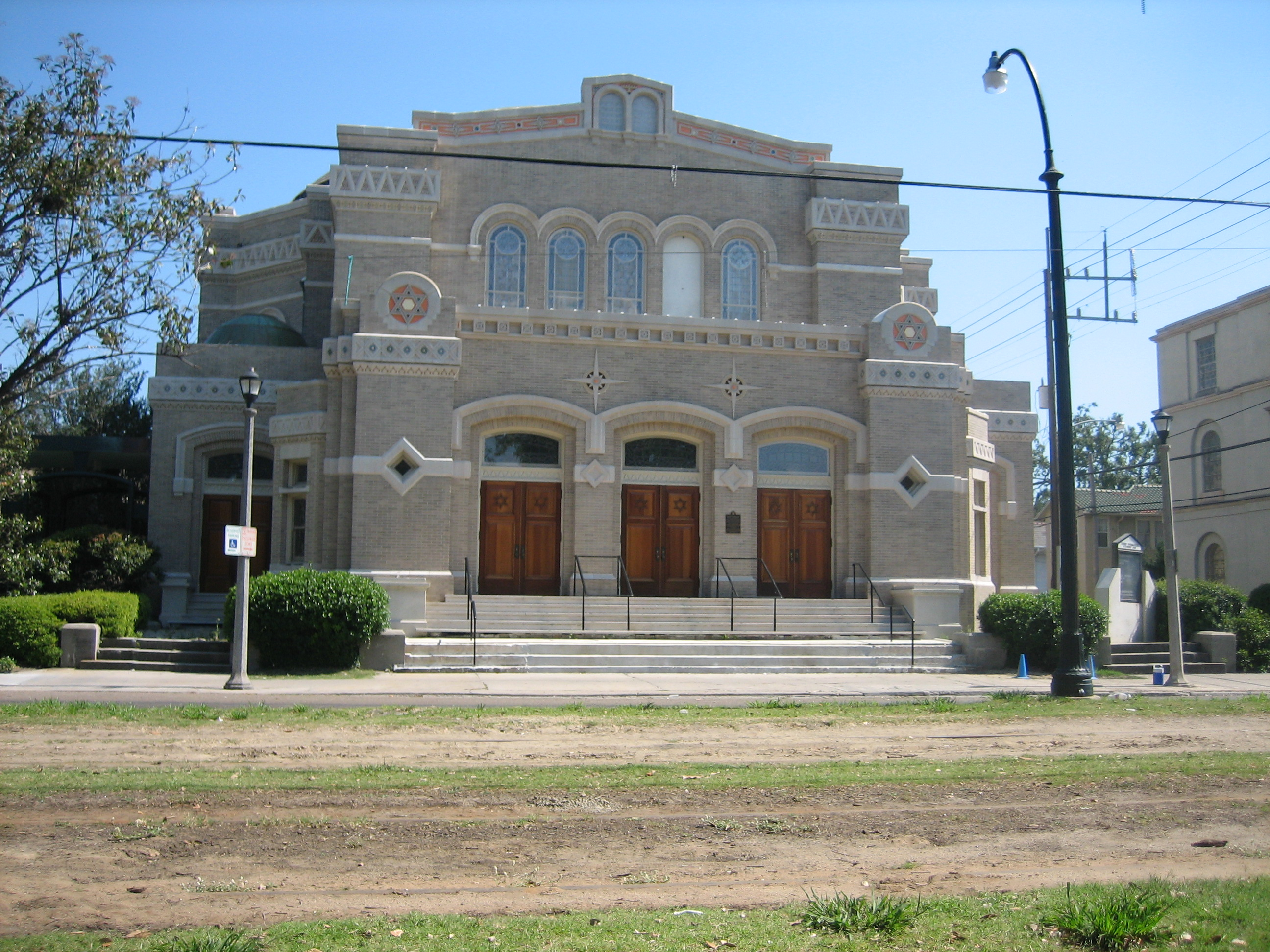
- Touro Synagogue building, in 2006

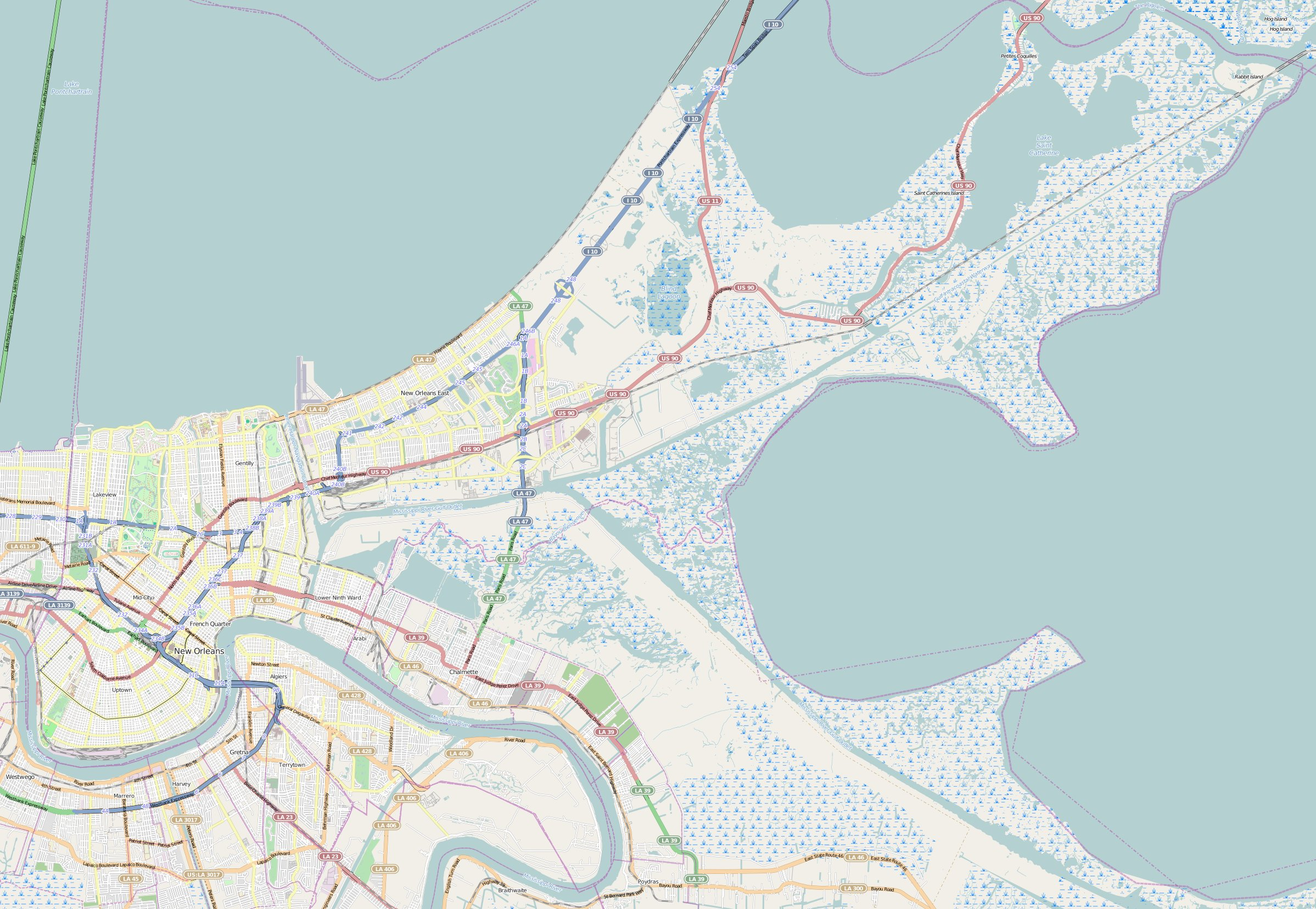
- Location in New Orleans, Louisiana

Religion
- Affiliation: Reform Judaism
- Ecclesiastical or organisational status: Synagogue
- Leadership: Rabbi Katie Bauman; Rabbi Todd Silverman; Cantor Kevin Margolius; Rabbi David Goldstein (Emeritus)
- Status: Active

Location
- Location: 4238 St. Charles Avenue in Uptown New Orleans, Louisiana 70115
- Country: United States
- Coordinates: 29°55′34″N 90°06′02″W

Architecture
- Architects: Emile Weil; George Glover
- Type: Synagogue
- Style: Byzantine Revival
- Established: 1881 (as a congregation)
- Completed: 1909

Specifications
- Capacity: 800 worshippers
- Dome: One
- Dome dia. (outer): 71 feet (22 m)
- Materials: Brick; terracotta; ceramic tiles

Website
- tourosynagogue.com

Touro Synagogue is a Reform Jewish synagogue located at 4238 St. Charles Avenue, in Uptown New Orleans Louisiana. It was named after Judah Touro, the son of Isaac Touro, the namesake of the country's oldest synagogue, Touro Synagogue in Newport, Rhode Island. The New Orleans Touro Synagogue is one of the oldest synagogues in the United States and the oldest in the country outside the original Thirteen Colonies.

== History ==
The current synagogue was founded in 1881 from the merger of two older (originally Orthodox) congregations: the Ashkenazi Shangarai Chasset (transliterated from Hebrew as "Gates of Mercy") congregation, founded in 1828, and the Sephardic Nefutzot Yehudah (transliterated from Hebrew as "Dispersed of Judah") congregation, founded in 1846, who split from Shangarai Chasset. The congregations reunited in 1881 and moved into a building on Carondelet Street. Judah Touro was a benefactor of both congregations, in addition to Roman Catholic and Protestant charities. The merged congregation assumed the Touro name in 1881 and joined the Union for Reform Judaism in 1891.

The sanctuary building on St. Charles Avenue in Uptown New Orleans was designed by Emile Weil, aged 29 years, and George Glover in the Byzantine Revival style, with a 71-foot-wide (22 m) dome. The synagogue was constructed in 1908 and dedicated 1 January 1909.

A religious school building, located adjacent to the synagogue, was completed in 1928, designed by Nathan Kohlman in the same general style and using the same materials. A multi-purpose addition was completed in 1963, designed by Robert Schenker in the Modernist style. The Norman Synagogue House, designed by Mark Baum and Lyons and Hudson in 1989, is in a neutral late-20th century style using materials that blend with the original structure. In 2019, the congregation began a restoration of the sanctuary's interior, delayed due to the impact of the COVID-19 pandemic.

== Rabbinical leaders ==
The following individuals have served as rabbi of the Touro Synagogue congregation

Ordinal	Officeholder	Term start	Term end	Time in office	Notes
1	Rabbi Isaac Leucht	1881	1914	32–33 years	
2	Rabbi Emil W. Leipziger	1914	1947	32–33 years	
3	Rabbi Leo A. Bergman	1948	1976	27–28 years	
4	Rabbi David Goldstein	1978	2005	26–27 years	
5	Rabbi Andrew Busch	2005	2008	2–3 years	
6	Rabbi Alexis Berk	2008	2019	10–11 years	
7	Rabbi Katie Bauman	2019	incumbent	6–7 years	
