= First Presbyterian Church of New Orleans =

Church building in Louisiana, United States

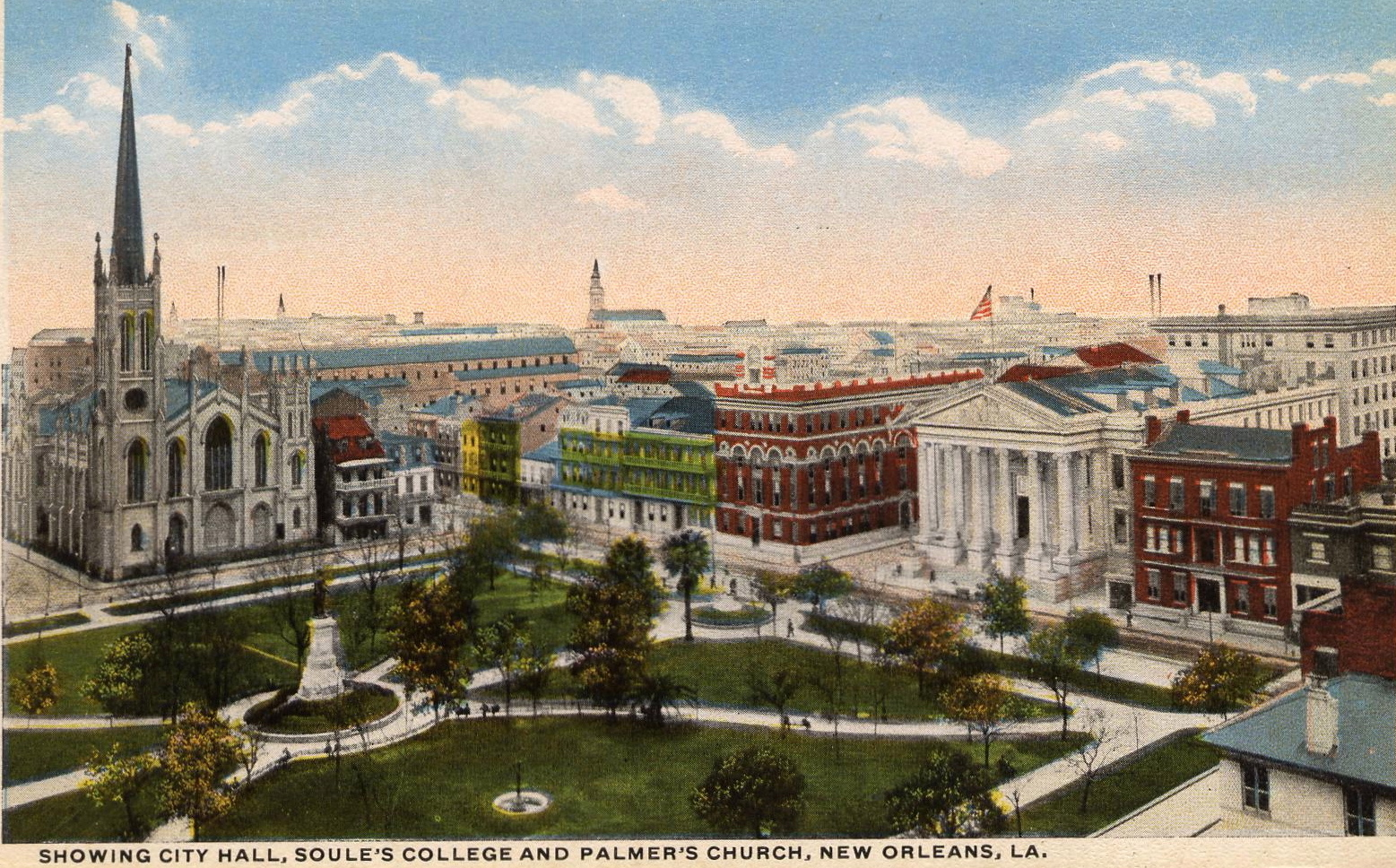
- First Presbyterian Church of New Orleans c. 1900
- First Presbyterian Church of New Orleans
- 29.9420°N 90.1097°W
- Location: New Orleans, Louisiana, United States
- Country: United States
- Denomination: Presbyterian
- Website: First Presbyterian Church of New Orleans website

History
- Founded: 1818

Architecture
- Style: Gothic

First Presbyterian Church of New Orleans is the oldest Presbyterian congregation in Louisiana (1818) and the second oldest Protestant congregation in the entire Mississippi Basin after Christ Church of New Orleans (1816). First Presbyterian Church of New Orleans (FPCNO) has played a pivotal role in the history of the Protestant church in the South as well as the history of New Orleans in the late 19th century, especially under the political and religious leadership of Rev. Dr. Benjamin Morgan Palmer who encouraged the Southern Presbyterian Church to secede at the beginning of the American Civil War, an action which was quickly imitated by most of the other Protestant denominations in the Confederate States of America. However, in the 21st century, FPCNO is now more widely known for its progressive stands on race, social justice and gender issues.

== History ==
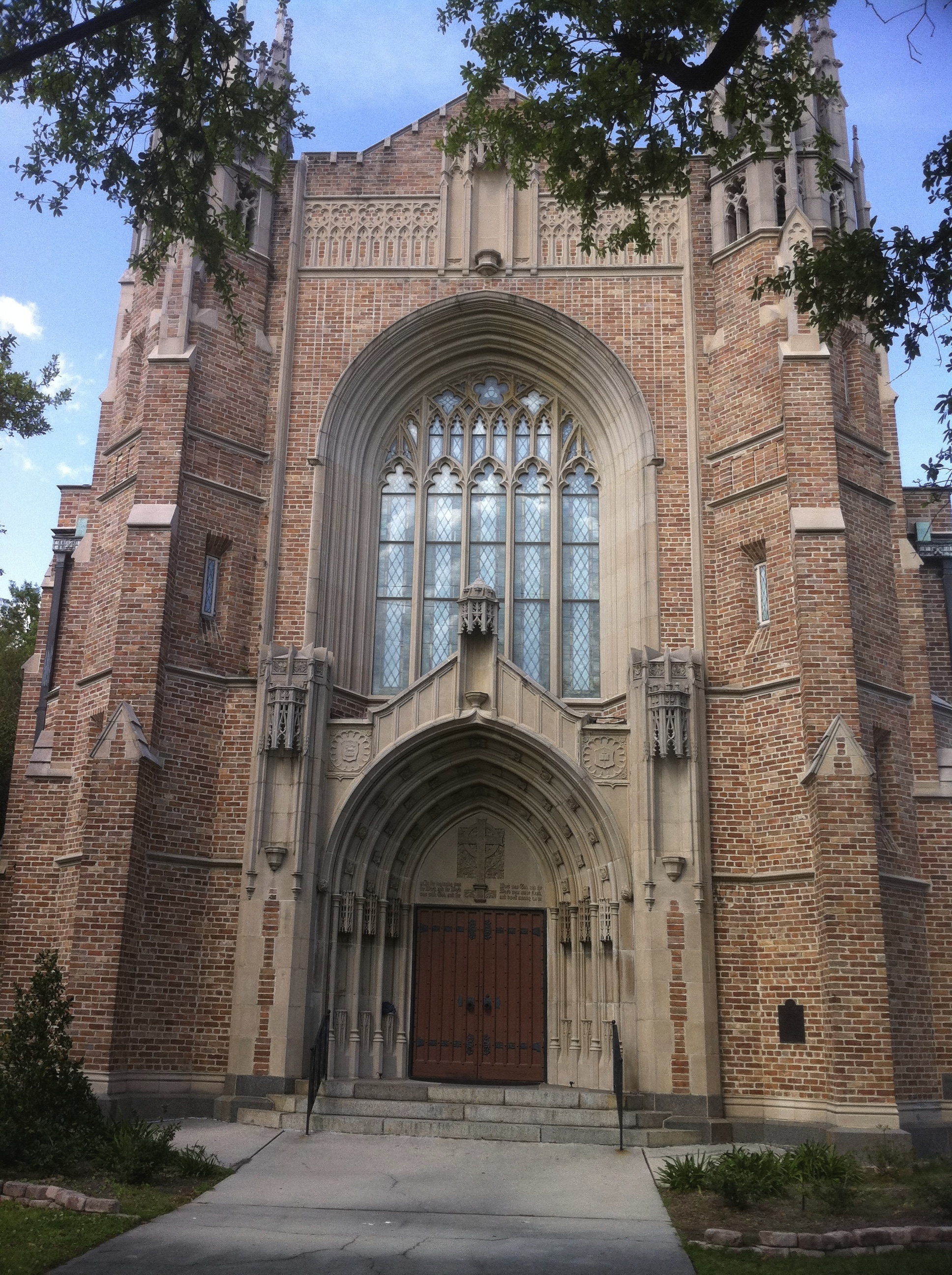
The exterior of the 1938 building

First Presbyterian Church of New Orleans was formed as a result of a public meeting on February 9, 1818, when a subscription list was opened to purchase a lot and build a church. Gifts were pledged by prospective members and interested citizens, and the City Council gave a lot and later $10,000. The first minister, Rev. Sylvester Larned, recruited by Rev. Elias Cornelius of the Connecticut Missionary Society, began conducting services on January 22, 1818. The cornerstone for the original building on St. Charles Avenue between Union and Gravier Streets was laid on January 8, 1819. An outstanding orator and popular pastor citywide, Larned died of yellow fever in August 1820 when 24 years old. He was succeeded by Dr. Theodore Clapp, whose theology split the congregation. In 1833 Clapp and the majority of the members formed a congregationalist church which in the 20th century affiliated with the Unitarian-Universalists (who now occupy the church building across the street from First Presbyterian Church). The nine members who remained were served by Dr. Joel Parker, who presided over the building of a new church on Lafayette Square in 1835.

After a shaky start, the church grew during the 1830s and -40s under Rev. Parker, Rev, John Breckenridge and Rev. William Anderson Scott. A spectacular fire destroyed the first church building in October 1854. Rebuilding began immediately, and services were held again in November 1857. The new building, in 14th-century Gothic style, was designed by Henry Howard who also designed the Pontalba Buildings and Nottoway Plantation. This third iteration of First Presbyterian Church seated 1,311 persons and had a steeple 219 feet from the ground, the tallest in the city. In 1856 Dr. Benjamin Morgan Palmer, was called as pastor and remained until his death in 1902. During the occupation of New Orleans in 1862, General Benjamin Butler used the bell at First Presbyterian Church of New Orleans to sound curfew, since it was the highest point in the city. Palmer was a leader in political as well as religious affairs. He was an ardent secessionist and was influential in not only bringing Louisiana, and his native South Carolina, to secession from the Union, but also became the first moderator of the Presbyterian Church in the Confederate States. So thoroughly had he created enmity that after the Civil War, not only were black members expelled from the denomination (a sizable minority), but it would take 118 years to reunite the Northern and Southern Presbyterian churches. Benjamin Palmer and First Presbyterian Church of New Orleans later spearheaded the drive that put the graft-riddled Louisiana State Lottery out of business in the 1880s.

On September 29, 1915, a disastrous hurricane destroyed the Lafayette Square church building except for rooms at the rear. Four hundred tons of debris were carted off. As before, rebuilding was swift, but it was decided to omit the upper portion of the spire. The congregation continued to worship on Lafayette Square until Easter Sunday, April 17, 1938. The federal government had indicated that it would like the site of the church for a new federal office building, and the congregation decided to sell. The present site in uptown on South Claiborne Ave (only two years after being reclaimed from swamp land) was purchased. Part of the agreement was that furnishings and materials could be salvaged before the church was torn down. These were incorporated into the new church, including the organ, bell, pews, the stained-glass windows except the one in the chancel, Benjamin Palmer’s marble topped communion table and his matching lectern are still in use, the four chairs and the settee in the chancel, mill work on the rear choir loft, and several marble plaques, one a memorial to the first preacher and another listing all the pastors and their years of service.

The church and the Palmer Hall education building to its left were dedicated Easter Sunday, April 9, 1939. An addition to connect the education building to the rear of the sanctuary was dedicated December 15, 1985. The Gothic style buildings built of brick with limestone trim, designed by Douglas Freret, sit on an entire square, bounded by Octavia, Jefferson, South Prieur Streets and South Claiborne Avenue. In the later part of the 20th century, First Presbyterian was successfully racially integrated by South African medical students working at nearby Tulane University, under the leadership of Dr. Wil MacIntosh, a first generation Scotsman, a civil rights proponent and a champion of inter-denominationalism.

At the time of Hurricane Katrina (2005), Rev. Cliff Nunn and Elder Zane Fisher passed through ten feet of flood water around the sanctuary to survey the damage, less than two days after the catastrophe, and immediately set about the task of cleaning up and rebuilding. First Presbyterian became "ground zero" for rebuilding the Broadmoor neighborhood and much of uptown—a job that took more than seven years and has involved over a thousand friends of First Presbyterian from all over the U. S. who have been housed at FPCNO and worked on projects throughout the city. During this time, First Presbyterian Church became deeply involved in assisting the large homeless population in uptown New Orleans, work that continues through the "Program of Hope" supported by several Presbyterian congregations.

These most recent pastors led the church from being a bastion of southern conservatism to being one of the most progressive and inclusive churches in the entire South. First Presbyterian has moved from barring her doors to African Americans in the 1860s to embracing diversity on many levels, of race, gender, ability, and sexual orientation. In 2007 First Presbyterian became the first More Light Presbyterian Church in Louisiana, welcoming the leadership of gay, lesbian, bisexual, and transgender people, which in turn led in 2012 to the call of the Rev. Fred J. Powell III, the first "out" gay pastor of a mainstream church in Louisiana.
