= Joel Parker (clergyman) =

United States Presbyterian clergyman and educator (1799–1873)

Joel Parker (born Bethel, Vermont, 27 August 1799; died New York City, 2 May 1873) was an American Presbyterian clergyman and educator.

== Biography ==
He graduated from Hamilton in 1824, and after studying at the Auburn Theological Seminary was ordained in the Presbyterian Church. He was pastor at Rochester in 1826–30. Attracted by the free church movement, in 1830 he went to New York City. The movement looked to provide church services to people who could not afford high pew rents. Parker organized the Dey Street Church in New York whose seats were free. He served as its pastor. In 1833, he was called to Louisiana to pastor First Presbyterian Church of New Orleans. In 1834 Rev. Parker went back up to New York to solicit subscriptions for a new church building. While away in New York rumors reached New Orleans that he had vilified the Roman Catholic community of New Orleans saint that "there were about 40,000 catholics in New Orleans, most of who were atheists (at least the men) and that they regarded religion as only good for women and servants". These reports were later proved to have been false, but before his returning November 1834 he was hung in effigy once or twice in the city. There were resolutions within the population of New Orleans demanding that First Presbyterian discharge him, but the congregation refused to bow to the pressure and Rev. Parker remained until June 1838 when he returned to New York. In 1838-40 he was in charge of the Tabernacle Presbyterian Church on Broadway in New York. Upon its being closed he became president of the Union Theological Seminary and occupied the chair of sacred rhetoric. He later held charges in Philadelphia in 1842–54, in New York at the Bleecker Street Presbyterian Church in 1854-63 and at Newark, New Jersey, in 1863–68.

== Literary work ==
He was for a time associate editor of the Presbyterian Quarterly Review and was author of:

- Lectures on Unitarianism (New York, 1829)
- Morals for a Young Student (1832)
- Invitations to True Happiness (1843)
- Notes on Twelve Psalms (1849)
- Reasonings of a Pastor (1849)
- Sermons (1852)
- Pastor's Initiatory Catechism (1855)

He edited the Sermons of Rev. John W. Adams, with a memoir (1851).
