= Judah Touro =

American businessman and philanthropist (1775–1854)

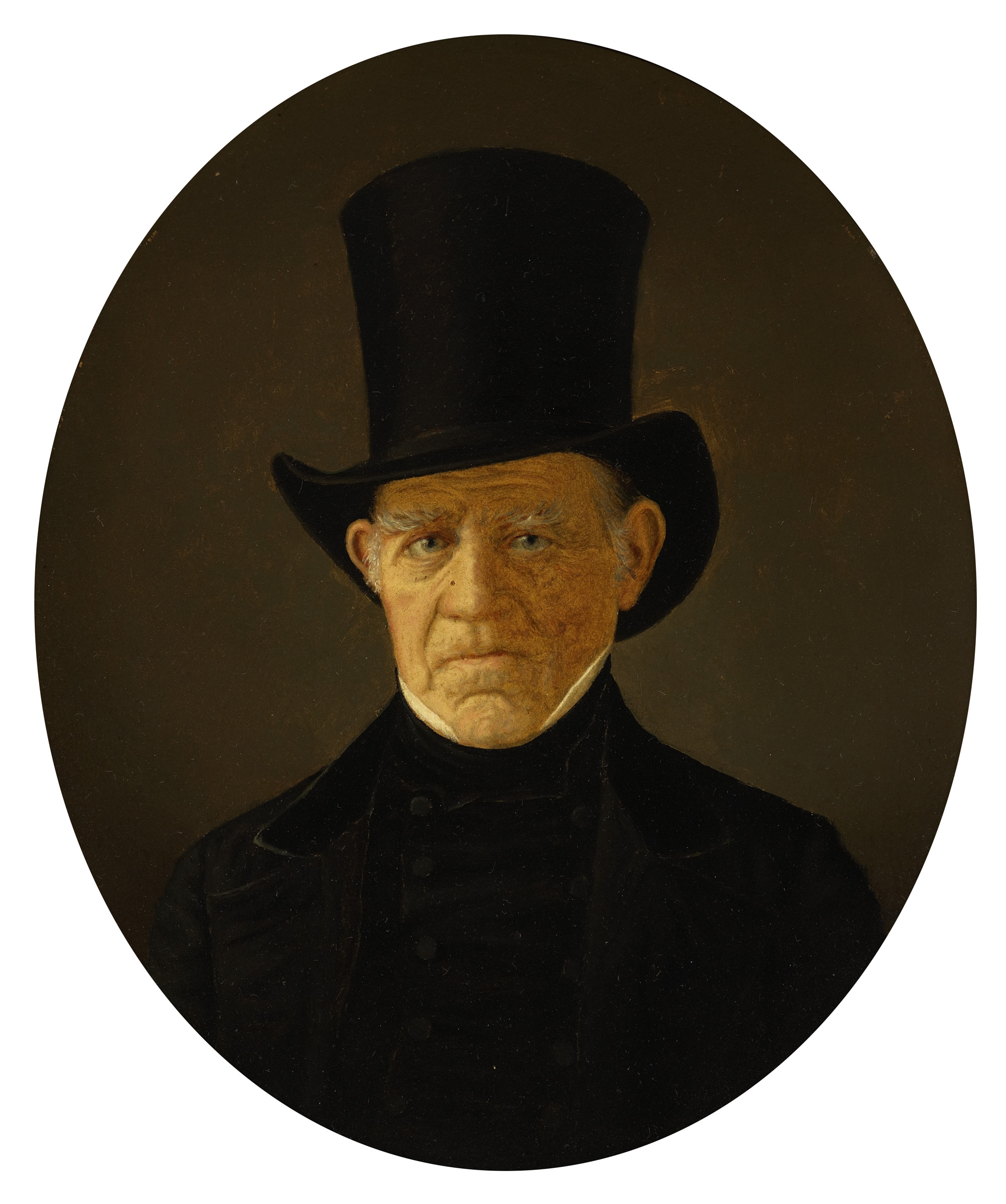
- Born: June 16, 1775; Newport, Colony of Rhode Island and Providence Plantations
- Died: January 18, 1854 (aged 78); New Orleans, Louisiana
- Occupations: Businessman, philanthropist
- Parent(s): Isaac Touro; Reyna Touro

Judah Touro (June 16, 1775 – January 18, 1854) was an American businessman and philanthropist whose estate funded many Jewish causes in the United States and pre-state Israel.

== Early life and career ==
Touro's father Isaac Touro of Holland was chosen as the hazzan at the Touro Synagogue in 1762, a Portuguese Sephardic congregation in Newport, Rhode Island. The family moved to New York in 1780 after the British occupied Newport during the American Revolutionary War; they moved to Kingston, Jamaica in 1782. Isaac died in 1783, and his wife Reyna moved the family to Boston to live with her brother Moses Michael Hays. She died in 1787, and Judah and his siblings were raised by his uncle, a merchant who helped found Boston's first bank.

Touro fell in love with his cousin but was forbidden marriage by her father, who sent him on a trading voyage to the Mediterranean in hopes of ending the romance. In 1801, Judah went to New Orleans, where he opened a small store. He sold soap, candles, codfish, and other exports of New England, eventually becoming a prominent merchant and ship owner, particularly after the Louisiana Purchase propelled the growth of the region and its commerce.

Despite his poor health, Touro enlisted in Andrew Jackson's army in the War of 1812. He was physically incapable of fighting, so he volunteered to carry ammunition to the batteries in the Battle of New Orleans, in which he was struck on the thigh by a 12-pound shot that tore off a large mass of flesh. He was given up for dead but saved by Rezin Davis Shepherd, a Virginia merchant. Shepherd helped nurse him back to health, and their close friendship continued throughout their lives. He recovered for a year after the war, then resumed building his business interests in shipping, trade, and real estate. He made a point of never mortgaging properties to acquire new ones, and lived a simple life in a small apartment. "I have saved a fortune by strict economy," he said, "while others had spent one by their liberal expenditures."

== Charitable works ==
Touro's lasting legacy was his philanthropy. He contributed $40,000—an immense sum at the time—to the Jewish cemetery at Newport, and bought the Old Stone Mill there, at that time thought to have been built by Norsemen, giving it to the city. The park surrounding it is known as Touro Park.

In New Orleans, he used his profits to buy and endow a cemetery, and to build a synagogue, an almshouse and an infirmary for sailors suffering from yellow fever, and a Unitarian church for a minister, Theodore Clapp, whom he greatly admired. The infirmary became Louisiana's largest free hospital, the Touro Infirmary. Touro was a major contributor to many Christian charities in New Orleans, as well as to such causes as the American Revolutionary War monument at Bunker Hill and the relief of victims of a large fire in Mobile, Alabama. In a New Orleans fund-raising drive for Christians suffering persecution in Jerusalem, he gave ten times more than any other donor. One profile of Touro particularly praised his willingness to give both to Jewish and non-Jewish religious causes: "An admirable trait evinced, was the unsectarian distribution of charity, while the donor ever continued a strict adherent to the principles of his faith." His $20,000 donation to The Jews' Hospital in New York City (now Mount Sinai Hospital) led to its opening in 1855.

Touro also participated in charity on a personal level, giving $1,500 to a woman who asked for help for her starving children and paying the $900 debt of an alcoholic man with a large family so that the man's children would be spared the separation from their parent. Clapp reported that Touro had given him not less than $20,000 over the course of their friendship. These stories are said to represent only a small portion of his personal giving, as he preferred to remain anonymous. Morais remarks, "It would be an impossibility to enumerate all the acts of munificent beneficence performed by Judah Touro."

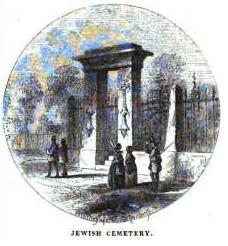
Touro Cemetery in Newport (1850)

Upon Touro's death, his estate provided endowments for nearly all the Jewish congregations in the United States, bequests to hospitals and orphanages in Massachusetts. A bequest to the Hebrew Education Society of Philadelphia led to the 1891 construction of a Jewish education center named Touro Hall in his honor. His will gave more than $500,000 to different causes, a sum equivalent to about $9 million in modern terms. His will also included another bequest, to his cousin Catherine Hays—"as an expression of the kind remembrance in which that esteemed friend is held by me." Hays, however, died in Virginia only days before Touro's own death.

Touro's estate also funded Mishkenot Sha'ananim, built around 1860 as the first Jewish residential settlement and almshouse outside the Old City of Jerusalem. The bequest, variously reported as $50,000 or $60,000, was left in trust to Sir Moses Montefiore for the relief of the Jewish poor of Jerusalem, and an inscription on the building's façade recorded that it "was established with the money bequeathed by the benefactor Judah Touro." Touro's role was later overshadowed by that of Montefiore, after whom the adjacent neighborhood of Yemin Moshe was named in 1892, though a lane there, Touro Lane, still bears Touro's name.

He is buried in the Jewish Touro Cemetery of Newport. The inscription on his tombstone reads: "To the Memory of / Judah Touro / He inscribed it in the Book of / Philanthropy / To be remembered forever."

Touro University (formerly Touro College) in New York State is named for him and his father Isaac.

== New Orleans ==
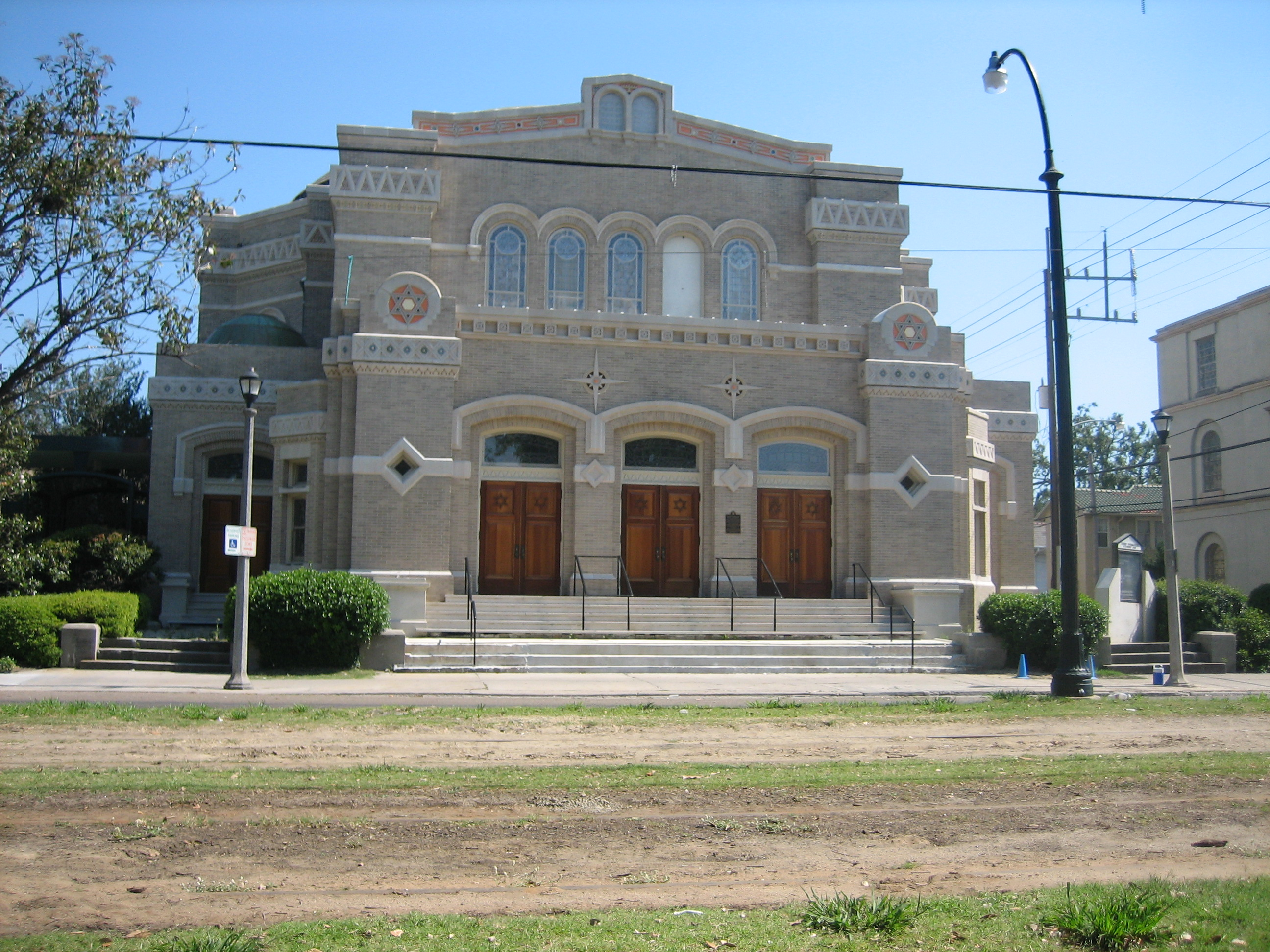
Touro Synagogue, Uptown New Orleans

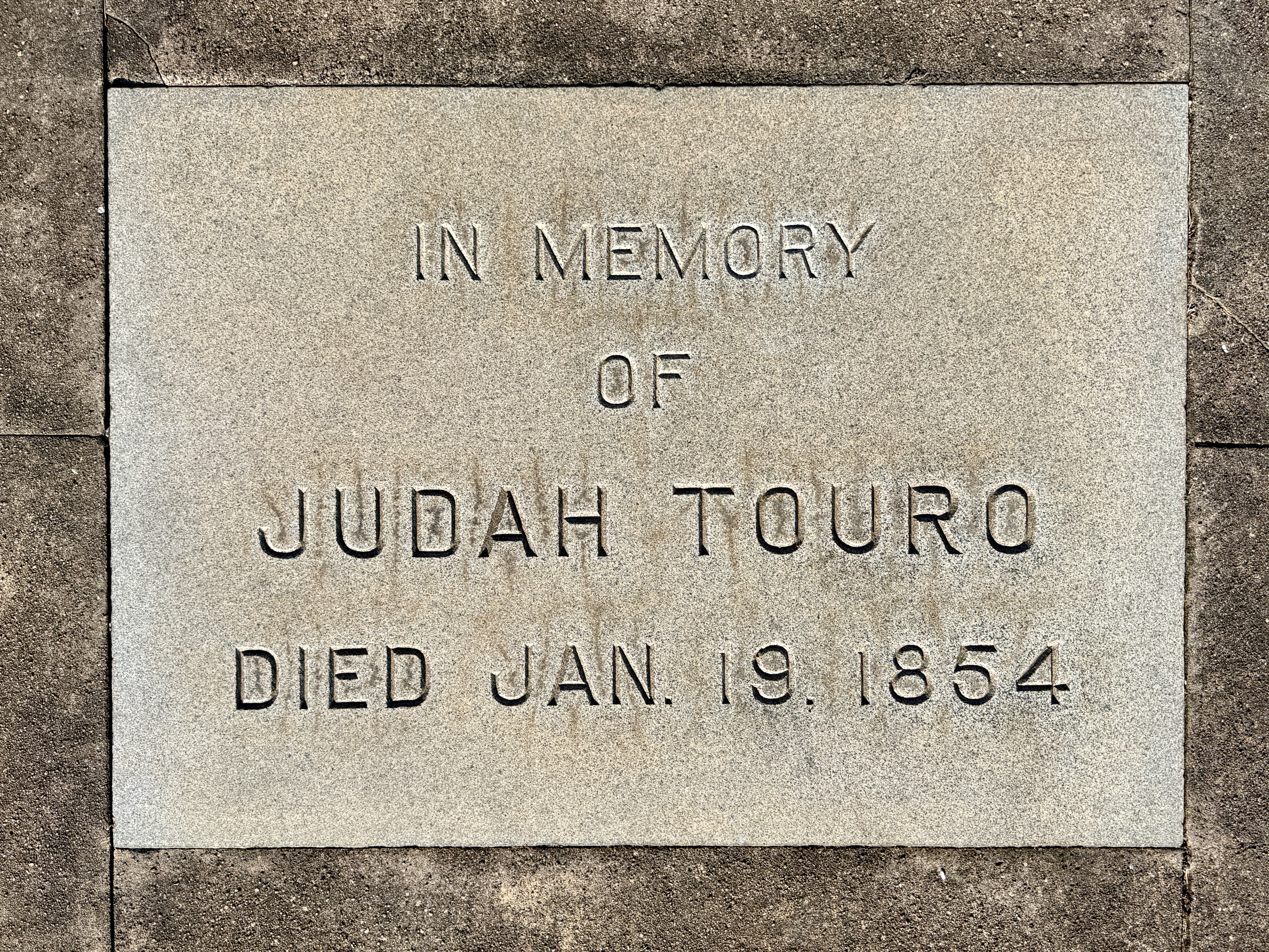
In memory or Judah Touro, Dispersed of Judah Cemetery

Touro lived in New Orleans for more than 50 years, and at the time of his death was one of the wealthiest and most prominent members of the city's Jewish community. Touro Infirmary and Touro Synagogue are named in his memory and thanks to his charity are among his more prominent legacies in the city.

A Judah Touro Scholarship is given at Tulane University in New Orleans. Among the winners of the award was the Louisiana Judge Henry L. Yelverton.
