= Touro Synagogue =

Historic synagogue in Rhode Island, United States

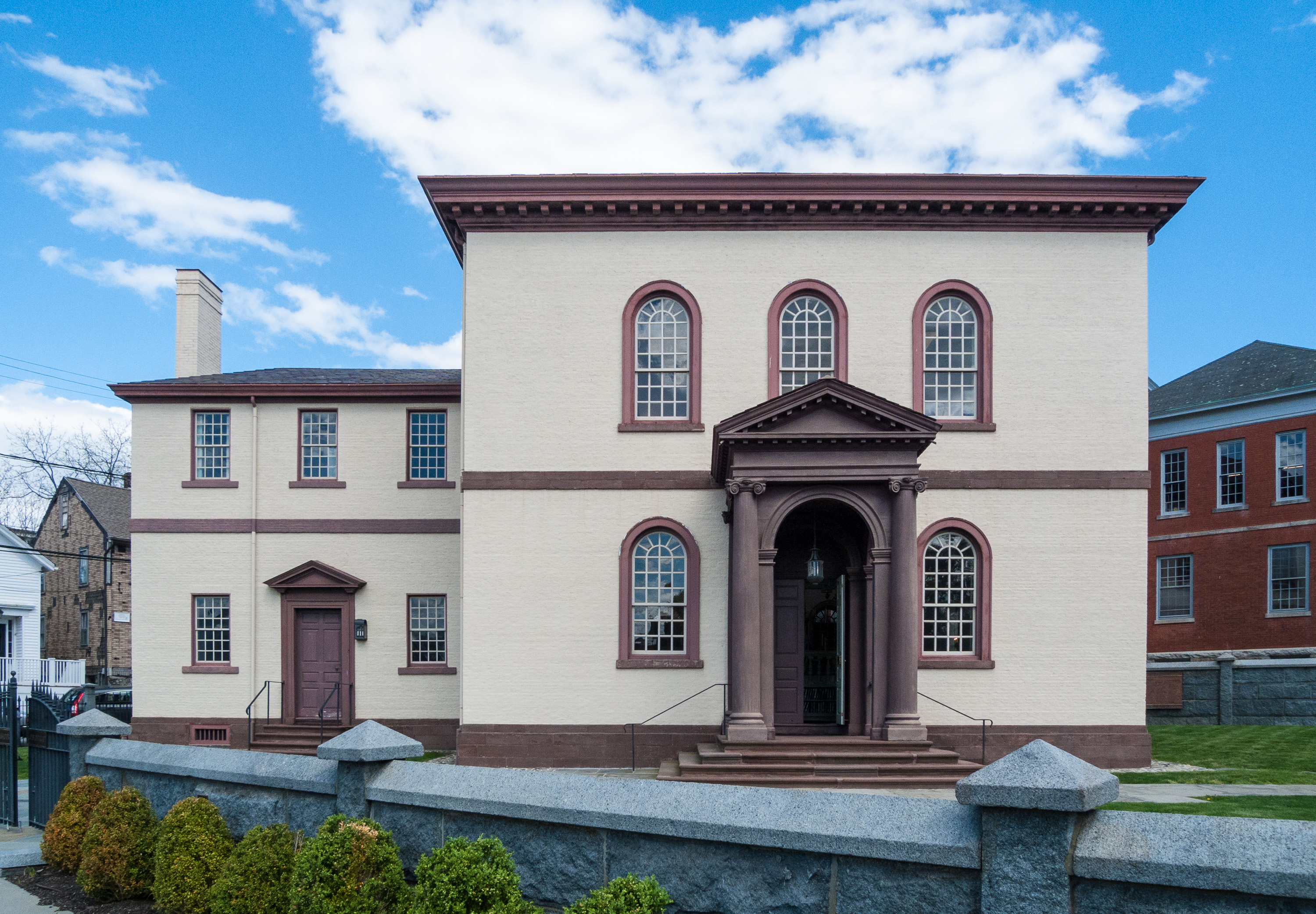
- Touro Synagogue, in 2017

- Location in Rhode Island

Religion
- Affiliation: Orthodox Judaism
- Rite: Ashkenazic (Nusach Sefard)
- Ecclesiastical or organisational status: Synagogue
- Ownership: Congregation Shearith Israel
- Status: Active

Location
- Location: Newport, Rhode Island
- Country: United States
- Coordinates: 41°29′22″N 71°18′43″W

Architecture
- Architect: Peter Harrison
- Type: Synagogue
- Established: c. 1654 (as a congregation)
- Completed: 1763
- Direction of façade: East

Website
- thetourosynagogue.org
- Touro Synagogue National Historic Site
- U.S. National Register of Historic Places
- U.S. National Historic Site
- U.S. National Historic Landmark District – Contributing property
- Area: 0.23 acres (0.00093 km^{2})
- Part of: Newport Historic District (ID68000001)
- NRHP reference No.: 66000927

Significant dates
- Added to NRHP: October 15, 1966
- Designated NHLDCP: November 24, 1968

The Touro Synagogue is a synagogue built in 1763 in Newport, Rhode Island. The building has been occupied by several different congregations over the years. The current occupant is known as Congregation Ahavath Israel (Hebrew: ק״ק אהבת ישראל). As the only surviving synagogue building in the U.S. dating to the colonial era, it is the oldest synagogue building still standing in the United States and North America. (Note: The oldest synagogue in continuous use on U.S. soil as a whole is St. Thomas Synagogue in the U.S. Virgin Islands.) In 1946, it was declared a National Historic Site.

Touro Synagogue represents a profound symbol of religious freedom, a cornerstone of Rhode Island's founding principles under Roger Williams. Rhode Island was established as a haven for those seeking freedom of conscience, and the synagogue's existence is a testament to the colony's early commitment to religious tolerance. The first congregation was composed of Sephardic Jews, believed to have migrated from the West Indies, where they had been part of the thriving trade networks connecting Dutch and English colonies. They followed the Spanish and Portuguese Jewish liturgy and customs, preserving their distinct cultural and religious heritage.

Amid the upheaval of the late 18th century, when threats of war loomed, the congregation entrusted the synagogue's deed and Torah scrolls to New York's Congregation Shearith Israel for safekeeping. Over time, the demographic shifted, and by the late 19th century, the congregation became predominantly Ashkenazi, reflecting the broader changes in Jewish immigration patterns to the United States.

In recent years, Touro Synagogue became the subject of a legal dispute over its ownership. In 2012, the Newport congregation sought to sell artifacts to finance the building's restoration, leading to a court case with Congregation Shearith Israel. In 2017, the United States Court of Appeals for the First Circuit ruled in favor of the New York congregation, a decision that was left standing when the U.S. Supreme Court declined to hear the case.

== History ==
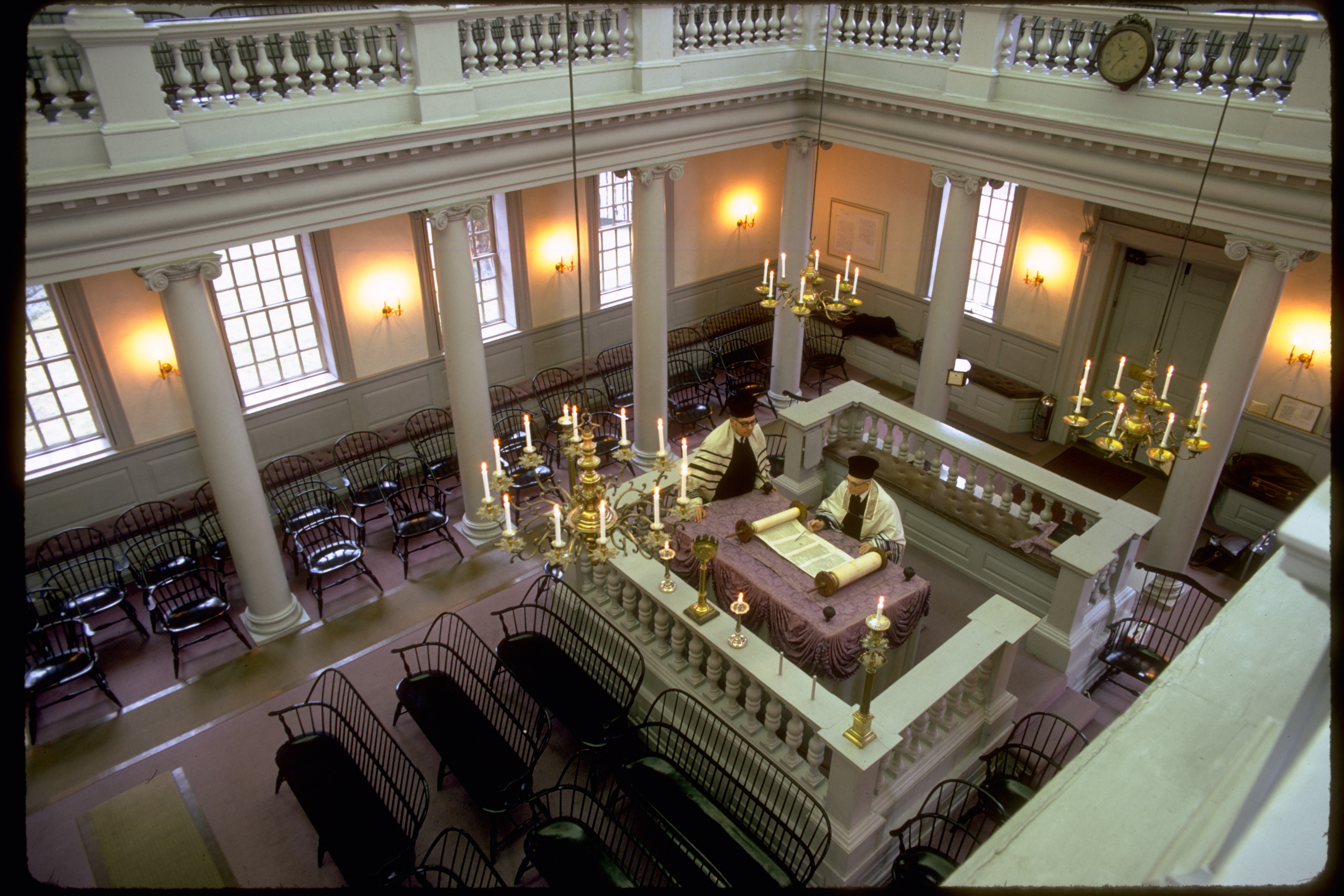
The synagogue's interior

Touro Synagogue was designed by Peter Harrison, a noted British architect, immigrant to British America, and Rhode Island resident. It is considered his most notable work. The interior is flanked by a series of twelve Ionic columns supporting balconies, which signify the twelve tribes of ancient Israel, and each column is carved from a single tree. The building is oriented to face east toward Jerusalem. The ark containing the Torah is on the east wall; above it is a mural representing the Ten Commandments in Hebrew, which was painted by Newport city clerk Benjamin Howland, the longest serving city clerk in Newport 1825-1875.

Touro Synagogue's original congregation was Shearith Jacob, later known as Shearith Israel, was founded in 1654, but they fled the original building during the American Revolutionary War. The Jeshuat Israel congregation dates to 1658, when 15 Spanish and Portuguese Jewish families arrived, probably from the Dutch or British West Indies. Many settled near Easton's Point.

The new Touro Synagogue building was formally dedicated on 2 December 1763 by the Jeshuat Israel congregation. Notable leaders of the synagogue included Abraham Pereira Mendes and Henry Samuel Morais (1900–01). The Touro Synagogue was built from 1759 to 1763 for the Jeshuat Israel congregation in Newport under the leadership of Cantor (Chazzan) Isaac Touro, a Dutch-born American rabbi. The cornerstone was laid by Aaron Lopez, a Portuguese-born and Newport-based merchant and philanthropist who was the wealthiest person in Newport. He supported Jewish causes and made his fortune through the trading of candles, whale oil, rum, slaves, in addition to being involved in the spermaceti candlemaking business and other commercial ventures. Judah Touro, the son of Isaac Touro and his wife Reyna, made a fortune as a merchant in New Orleans. He left $10,000 ($360,000 in current dollar terms) in his will for the upkeep of the Jewish cemetery and synagogue in Newport.

In 1946, Touro Synagogue was designated as a National Historic Site, and it is an affiliated area of the National Park Service. The synagogue was listed on the National Register of Historic Places on October 15, 1966. In 2001, the synagogue became an Affiliate Site of the National Trust for Historic Preservation, which was dissolved in November 2026 as a result of the ownership dispute and legal decisions in Congregation Shearith Israel v. Congregation Jeshuat Israel..

The Touro Synagogue is located at 72 Touro Street and remains an active Orthodox synagogue. The building underwent a restoration in 2005–2006, and a recreation of the original dedication ceremony was conducted in 2013 in honor of the 250th anniversary.

=== Annual recitation of the Washington–Seixas letter on religious pluralism ===
On August 18, 1790, President George Washington visited Newport as part of a tour of New England following Rhode Island's ratification of the Constitution. He met with various local religious groups including Christians, Freemasons, and the Touro Synagogue congregation, known as Congregation Yeshuat Israel at the time, and read open letters in a prearranged ceremony. Touro Synagogue's warden, Moses Seixas, wrote to Washington, expressing the support of the Congregation for Washington's administration and good wishes for him.

Washington sent a letter on August 21 in response, which read in part:

... the Government of the United States ... gives to bigotry no sanction, to persecution no assistance. ... May the children of the Stock of Abraham, who dwell in this land, continue to merit and enjoy the good will of the other Inhabitants; while every one shall sit in safety under his own vine and fig tree, and there shall be none to make him afraid. May the father of all mercies scatter light and not darkness in our paths, and make us all in our several vocations useful here, and in his own due time and way everlastingly happy.

— Letter of George Washington to the Hebrew Congregation in Newport, Rhode Island

The Touro congregation annually reads President Washington's letter on religious pluralism and celebrates the occasion with invited speakers. They have included Supreme Court justices Ruth Bader Ginsburg and Elena Kagan; and Brown University presidents Ruth Simmons and Christina Paxson.

As of June 2011, the original letter is owned by the Morris Morgenstern Foundation and is valued between $5 million and $10 million.

== Congregation ==
The congregation at Newport was initially composed of Jews with roots in the Sephardic Spanish and Portuguese diaspora, and by the eighteenth century, with some Ashkenazi Jews.

The first Jewish residents of Newport, fifteen Spanish Jewish families, arrived in 1658. It is presumed that they arrived via the communities in Curaçao, home to the oldest active Jewish congregation in the Americas, dating to 1651, and Suriname. The small community worshiped in rooms in private homes for more than a century before they could afford to build a synagogue.

The community purchased and dedicated the Jewish Cemetery at Newport in 1677.

In the late 1700s, the Jewish community removed the Torah scrolls and sent them for safekeeping, along with the deed to the building, to Congregation Shearith Israel in New York. The keys left the Jewish community and were passed to the Goulds, a Quaker family in Newport.

From the 1850s on, the building was occasionally opened for worship for the convenience of summer visitors. It was reopened on a regular basis in 1883 as Jewish life in Newport revived with the late nineteenth century immigration of eastern European Jews (Ashkenazim). The synagogue acquired a nearby building and ran a Hebrew school and other activities. It continues to serve as a thriving congregation with many year-round programs.

The congregation currently uses the ArtScroll Nusach Sefard prayer book.

Marc Mandel became the rabbi in July 2012. As of 2012, the congregation consisted of about 175 families. Stephen Belsky served as interim rabbi from 2023 to 2025. The current rabbi is Gershon Klapper.

== Restoration ==
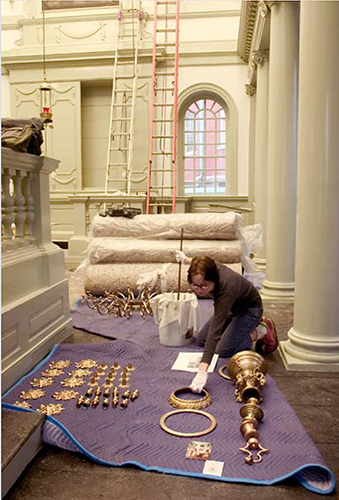
Restoration of metal artifacts at Touro Synagogue

During 2005 and 2006, Touro Synagogue invested in a restoration project for its valued antique metal artifacts. In total, 150 metal objects, from eighteenth century hardware to European chandeliers and silver rimonim (ceremonial bells used on the Torah), needed to be rebuilt, have their surfaces stabilized, and have missing parts replaced. The project was carried out by the Newport-based restoration company Newmans Ltd.

== Ownership controversy ==
Conflict over the ownership of the Touro building and its contents surfaced in 2012. Newport's Congregation Jeshuat Israel put up for sale ceremonial bells, called rimonim, to the Museum of Fine Arts, Boston, for $7.4 million. New York's Congregation Shearith Israel sued the Newport congregation, saying that Shearith Israel owns the Touro synagogue building and its contents, based on the 18th-century transfer of deed. They wanted to evict the Newport congregation from the Touro building and site. In April 2015 both sides of the dispute said several attempts at mediation had failed and they were preparing for trial.

In May 2016 a federal judge ruled on the matter, rejecting Congregation Shearith Israel's claim to oversight. U.S. District Judge John J. McConnell, Jr. noted that "for at least the past 20 years, Shearith Israel has not taken any meaningful action in its capacity as trustee for the Touro Synagogue and lands." In June 2016 Congregation Shearith Israel announced it would appeal the decision. Congregation Shearith Israel was awarded ownership on August 2, 2017, by the United States Court of Appeals for the First Circuit in Boston.

On March 18, 2019, the United States Supreme Court declined to take up the case; thus, the lower court ruling that Congregation Shearith Israel owns Touro stands.

On April 10, 2025, the Rhode Island Supreme Court affirmed Shearith Israel's right to immediate possession of the synagogue in Congregation Shearith Israel v. Congregation Jeshuat Israel. Following the eviction, Shearith Israel sued Jeshuat Israel in May 2025 over alleged uncompleted repairs, removed religious items, and upkeep funds. In May 2026, Rhose Island Superior Court Judge Sarah Taft-Carter ruled that Jeshuat Israel could worship across the street from the synagogue at the Levi Gale House, while barring both congregations from drawing on roughly $4.7 million in disputed trust funds.

== Images ==
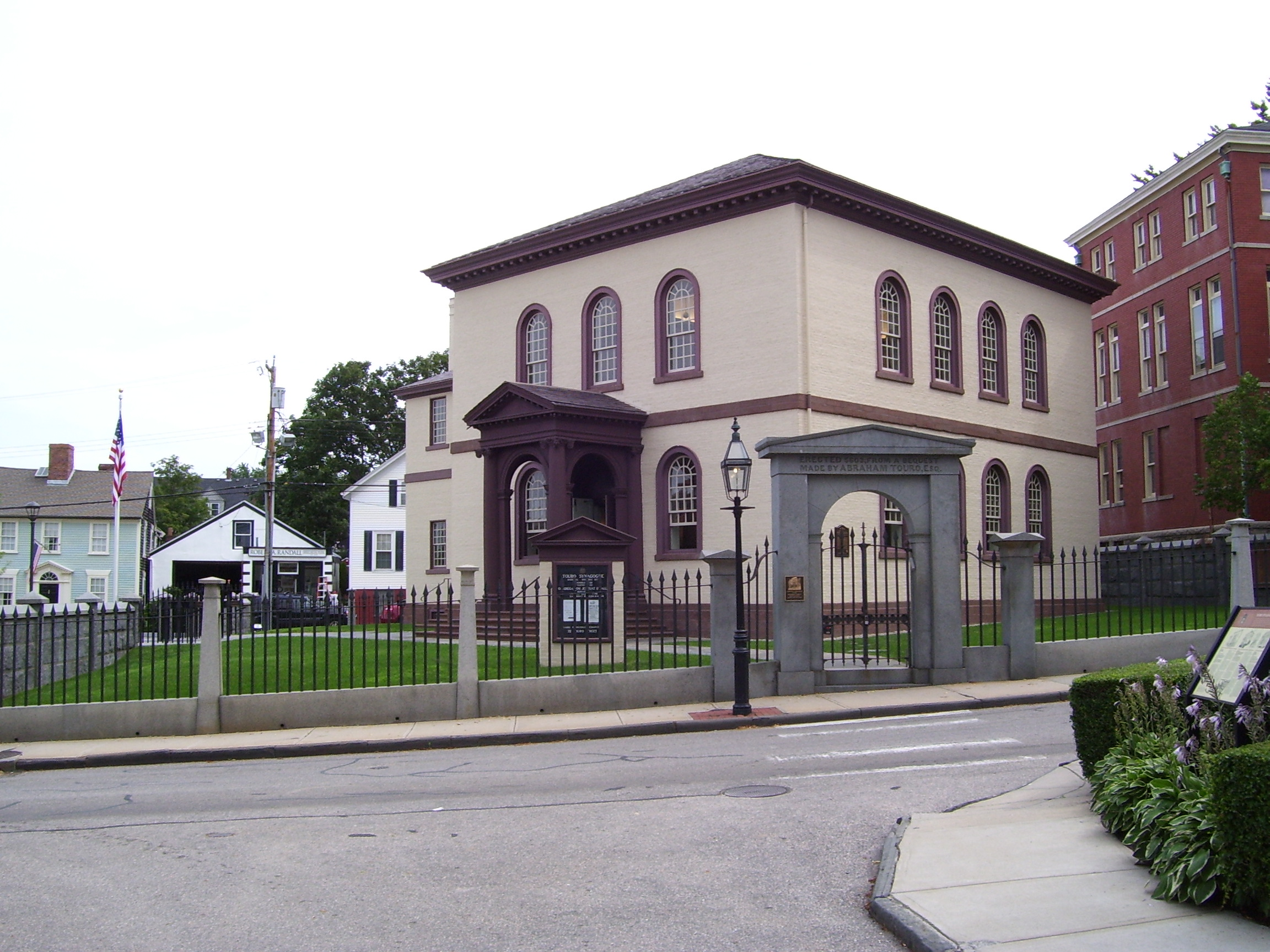
The building's exterior in 2009

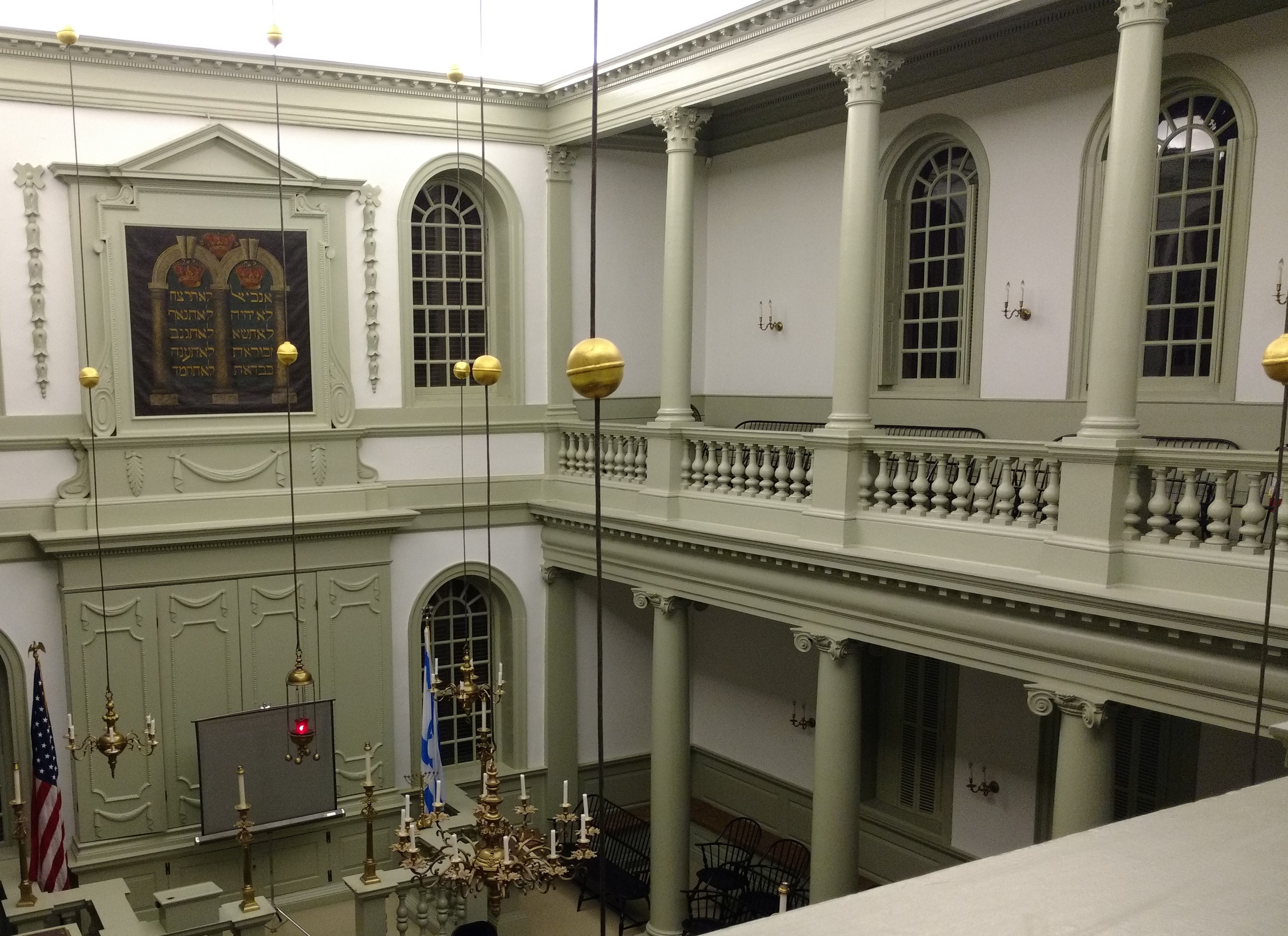
The synagogue's interior in 2019

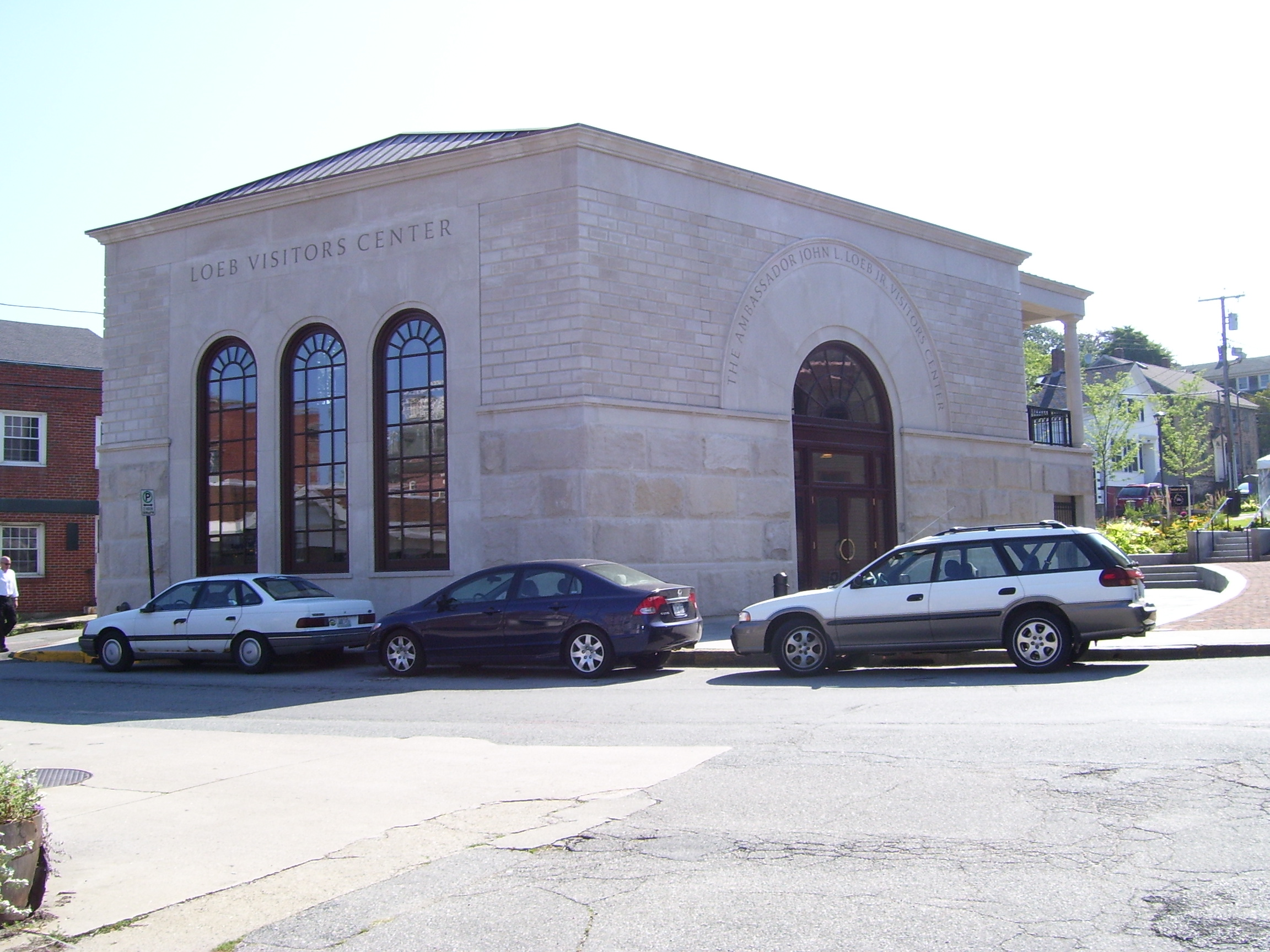
Loeb Visitors Center, built in 2009

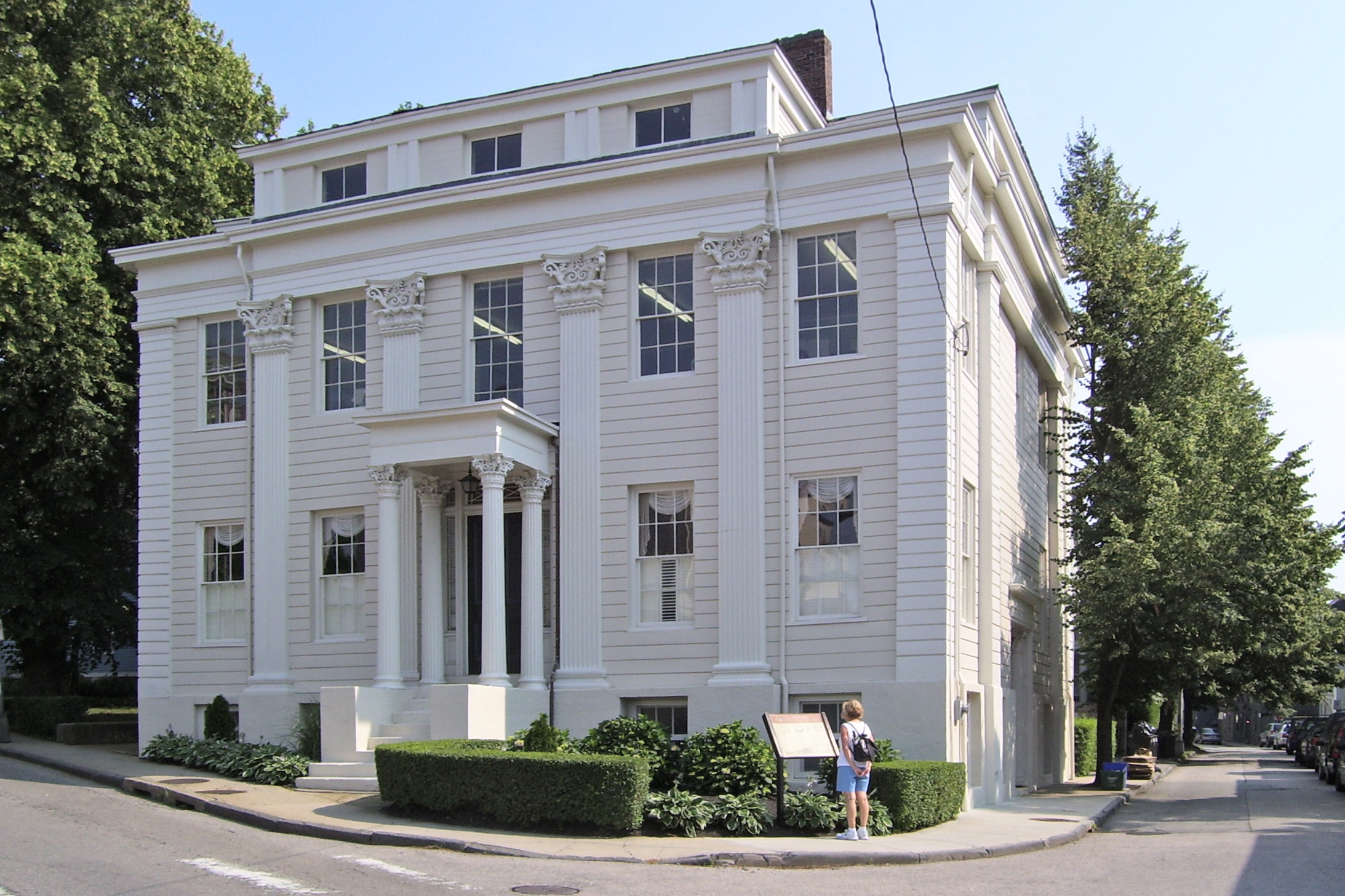
The adjacent Levi H. Gale House is owned by the Abraham Touro Fund

== See also ==
- Touro Cemetery
- Touro Synagogue (New Orleans)
- Congregation Jeshuat Israel
- Kahal Kadosh Beth Elohim
- Partners for Sacred Places
- List of the oldest synagogues in the United States
- National Register of Historic Places listings in Newport County, Rhode Island
