= Isaac Touro =

Colonial American rabbi (1738–1783)

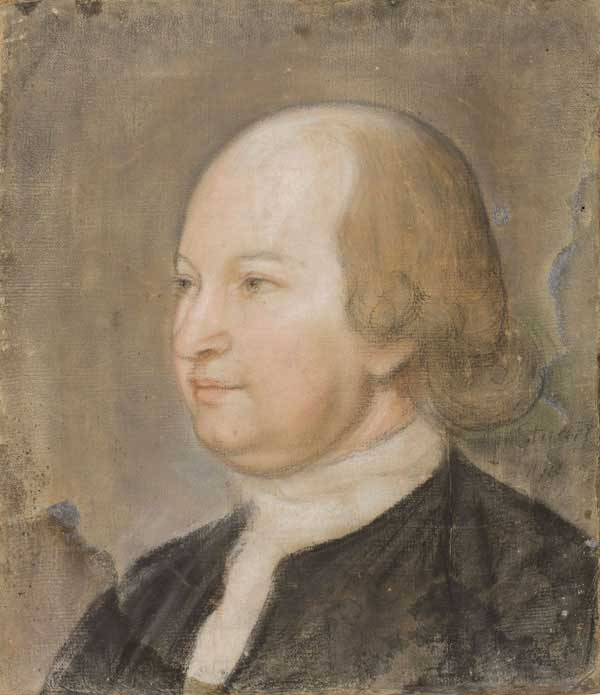
- portrait by Gilbert Stuart
- Born: 1738
- Occupation: Rabbi
- Children: Judah Touro

Isaac Touro (1738 – 8 December 1783) was a Dutch-born American rabbi. He was a Jewish leader in colonial America. Born in Amsterdam, in 1758 he left for Jamaica. In 1760, he arrived in Newport, Rhode Island, to serve as hazzan and spiritual leader of Jeshuath Israel, a Portuguese Sephardic congregation. Soon after his arrival, the congregation built the Touro Synagogue, the oldest synagogue in the United States.

When the American Revolution broke out, Touro was a Loyalist, and when the British captured Newport in 1776, he remained in the city with his wife Reyna and their children, while many of his Whig congregants fled. In 1779, he moved with the British to New York, but he had no means of supporting himself there, and was dependent on British charity, so in 1782 he moved to Kingston, Jamaica, where he died in 1783.

His sons Abraham and Judah were renowned philanthropists.

== Touro College ==
Touro College, chartered in New York State in 1970, is named for the Touro family. Judah and Isaac Touro were Jewish community leaders of colonial America, who represent the ideals upon which Touro College bases its mission. Inspired by the democratic ethos enunciated by founding US President George Washington at Newport, Rhode Island, when he visited the Touro Synagogue in 1790, the Touro family provided major endowments for universities, the first free library in North America, community health facilities in the United States, and pioneering settlements in Israel.
