= List of hospitals in the Bronx =

This is a list of hospitals in the Bronx, sorted by hospital name, with addresses and a brief description of their formation and development. Hospital names were obtained from these sources. A list of hospitals in New York (state) is also available.

== Hospitals ==
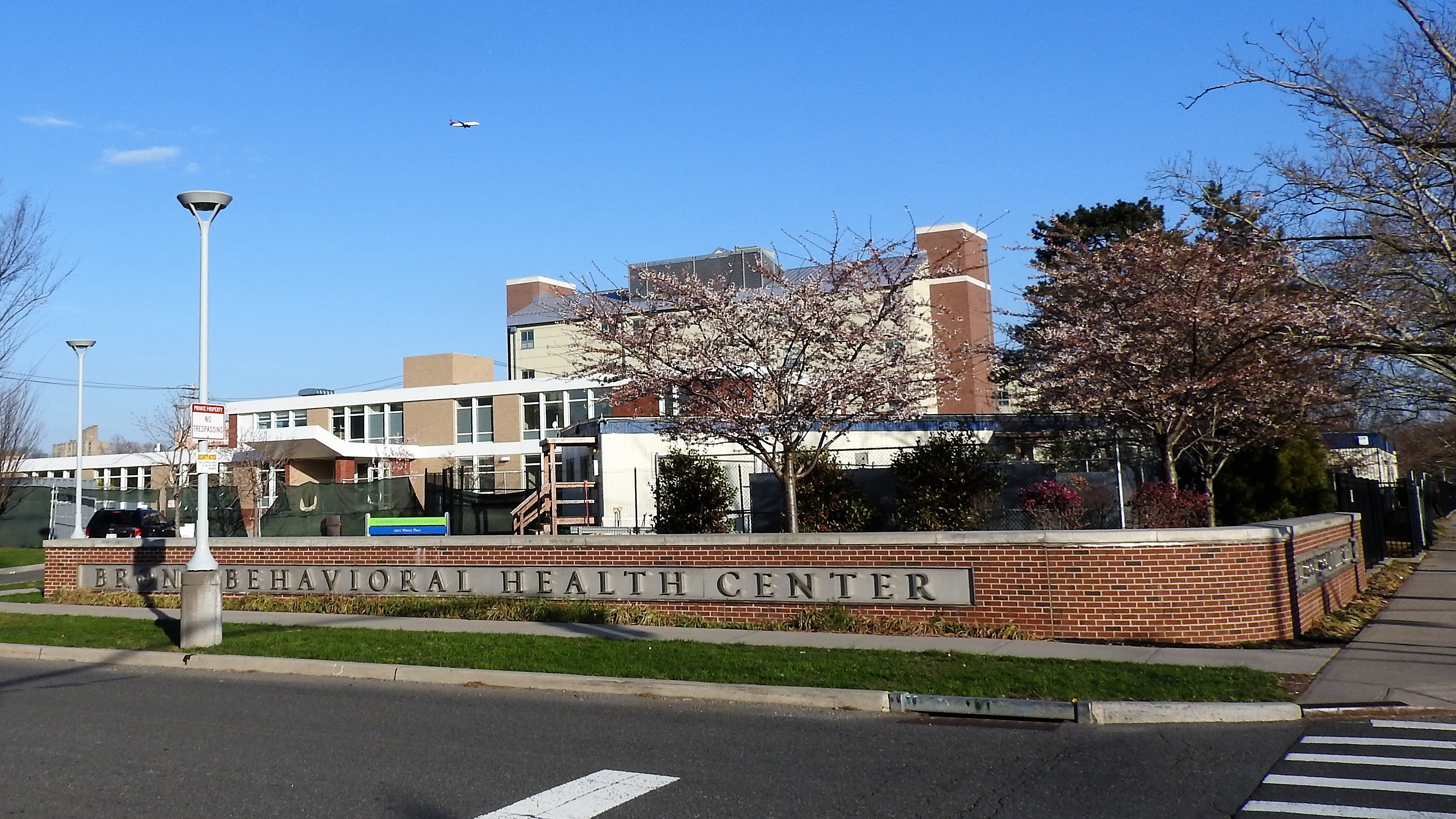
Bronx Behavioral Health Center

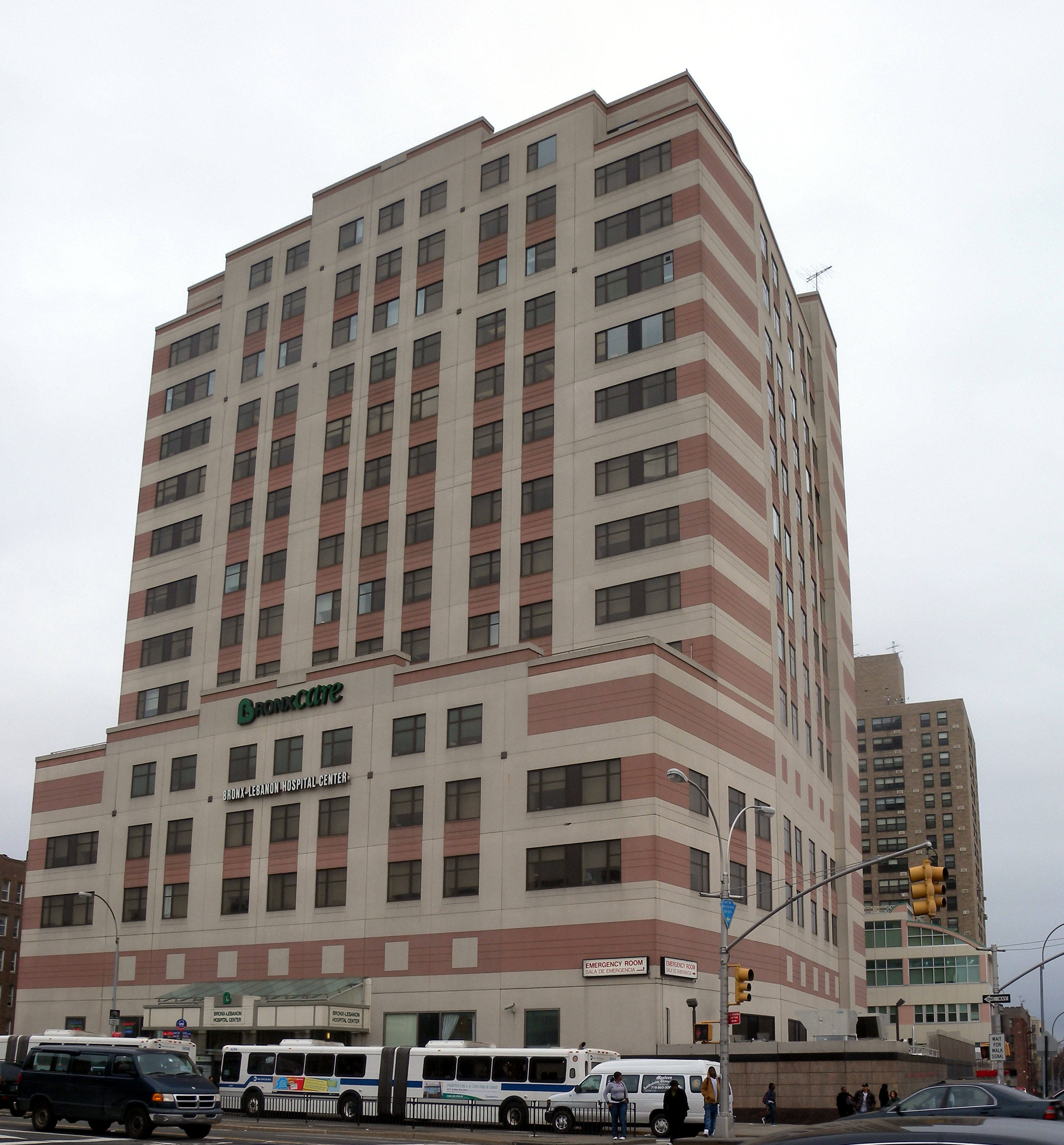
BronxCare Health System

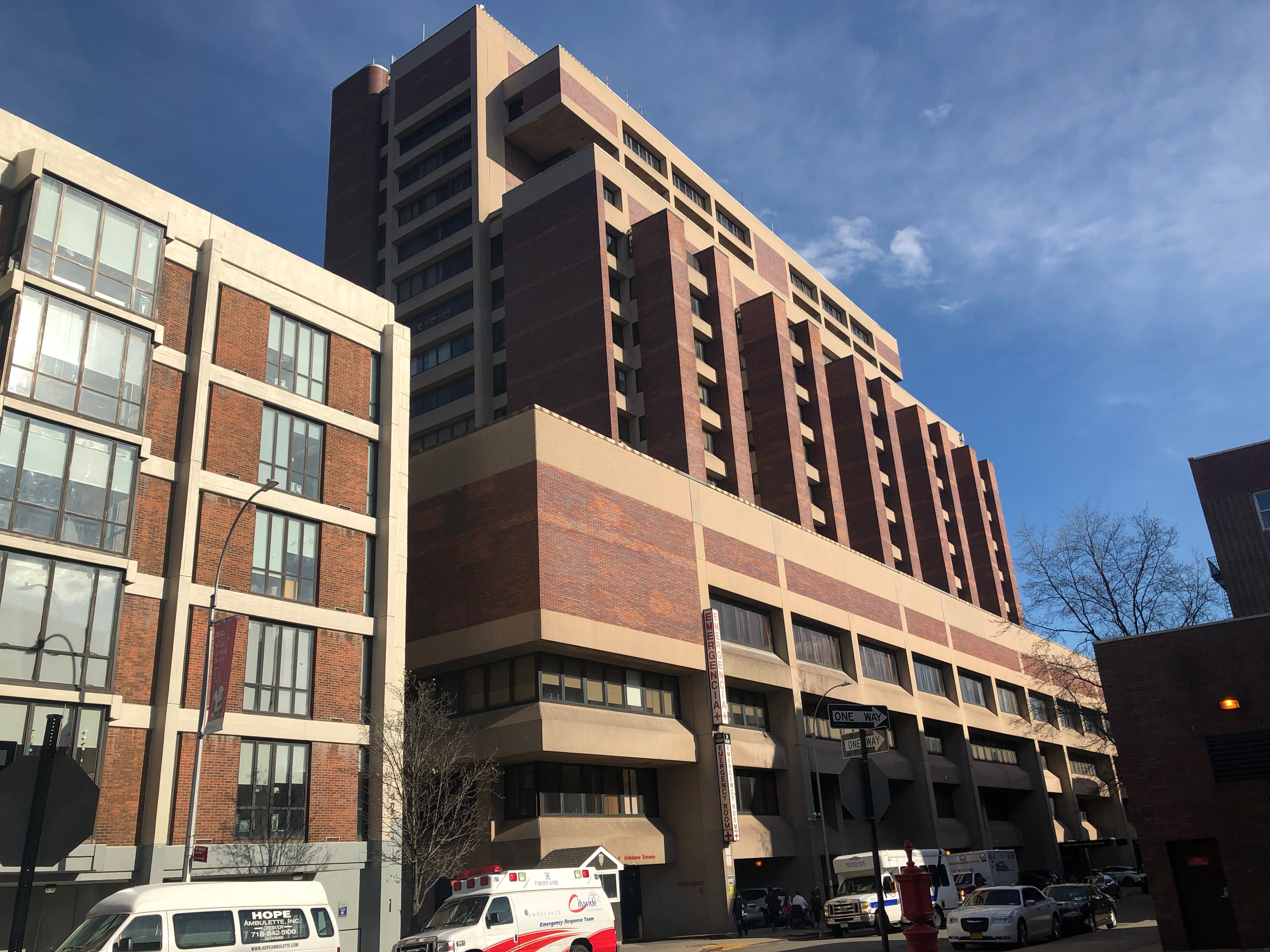
North Central Bronx Hospital

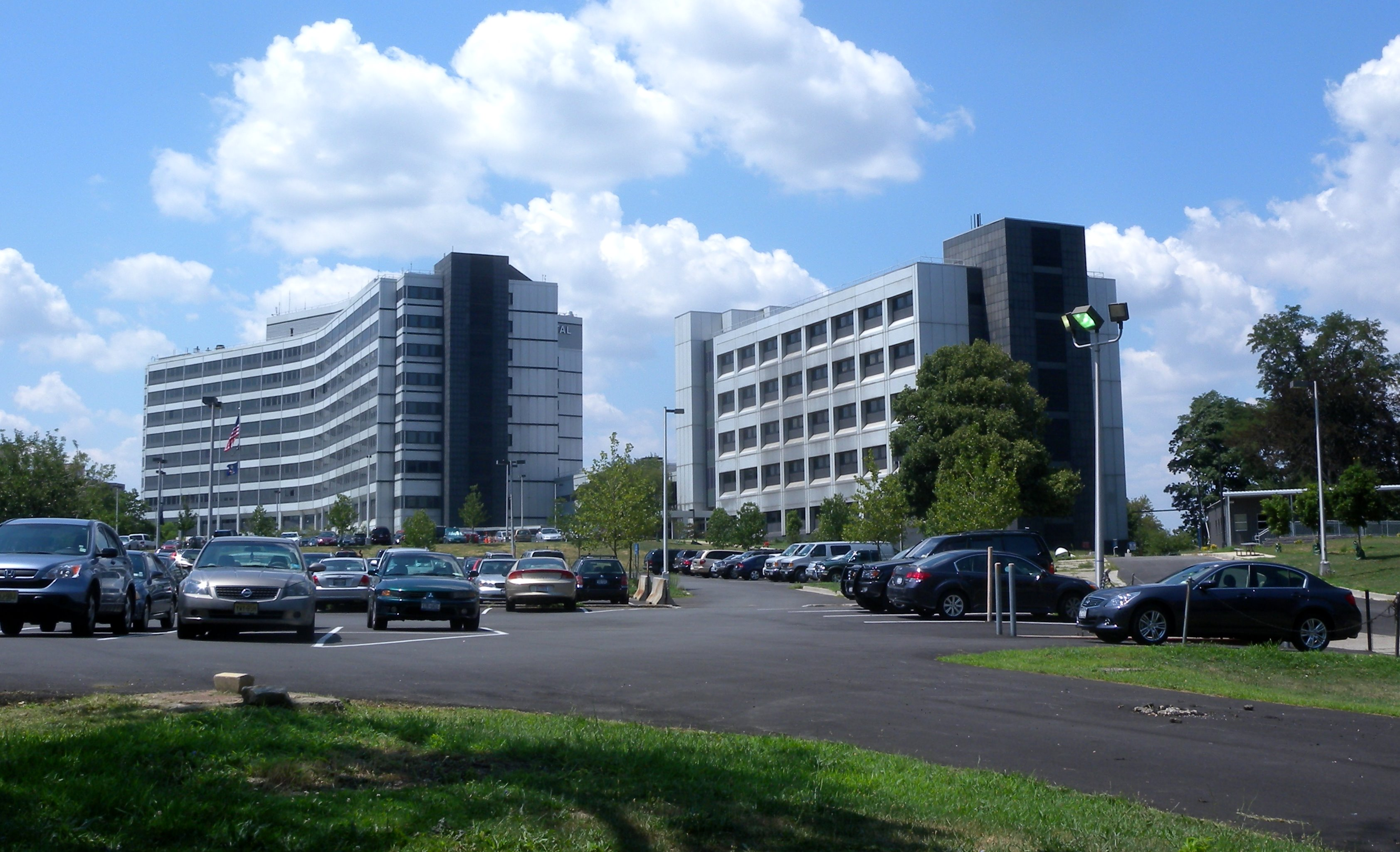
Bronx Veterans Hospital (James J. Peters VA Medical Center)

- Beth Abraham Center, 612 Allerton Avenue, opened as Beth Abraham Home for Incurables on March 21, 1920, in memory of Avraham Eliezer Alperstein by his wife Bertha Alperstein
- BronxCare Health System, renamed in 2017 from Bronx-Lebanon Hospital Center, which was formed via the merger of Bronx Hospital and Lebanon Hospital on October 8, 1962.
  - Concourse Division, 1650 Grand Concourse, the Bronx. Incorporated as Lebanon Hospital on July 17, 1890. Opened on the block bounded by Westchester Avenue, East 150th Street, Cauldwell Avenue, and Trinity Avenue on February 22, 1893. Moved to its current location in June 1946.
  - Fulton Division, 1276 Fulton Avenue, the Bronx. Opened on May 9, 1920.
- Bronx Psychiatric Center, (Bronx Behavioral Health Center) 1300 Waters Place, the Bronx.
- Calvary Hospital, 1740 Eastchester Road, the Bronx. Founded as Women of Calvary in 1899, treating patients in their private homes at 7 and 9 Perry Street in Manhattan. Renamed House of Calvary, moved to 1600 Macombs Road in the Bronx in 1915, renamed Calvary Hospital in 1968. Moved to current location in 1978. Primary focus is on end-of-life and hospice care.
- Jacobi Medical Center, 1400 Pelham Parkway South, the Bronx. Named after Abraham Jacobi and opened on July 1, 1955 as part of Bronx Municipal Hospital Center.
- James J. Peters VA Medical Center, 130 West Kingsbridge Road, the Bronx. Opened as United States Veterans' Hospital no. 81 on April 15, 1922. Named after James J. Peters in 2002.
- Lincoln Medical Center, 234 East 149th Street, the Bronx. Founded by the Society for the Relief of Worthy Aged Indigent Colored Persons as the Home for the Colored Aged at West 51st Street and the Hudson River in Manhattan in 1841, moved to Park Avenue and East 40th Street in 1843, moved to First Avenue between East 64th and East 65th Streets in 1850, renamed the Colored Home and Hospital in 1882, moved to Concord Avenue and East 141st Street in the Bronx in 1898, renamed Lincoln Hospital and Home in 1902, renamed Lincoln Medical Center and opened in its current location in 1976.
- Montefiore Medical Center – named for Sir Moses Montefiore. Affiliated with the Albert Einstein College of Medicine.
  - Moses Division ("Montefiore Hospital"), 111 East 210th Street, the Bronx. Founded as Montefiore Home for Chronic Invalids located at Avenue A and East 84th Street in Manhattan and opened on October 26, 1884, the day Moses Montefiore became 100 years old. Moved to Broadway and West 138th Street in 1888, renamed Montefiore Hospital for Chronic Diseases in 1901, moved to its current location and renamed Montefiore Home and Hospital for Chronic Diseases on November 30, 1913, renamed Montefiore Hospital for Chronic Diseases in 1920, renamed Montefiore Hospital and Medical Center on October 11, 1964, renamed the Henry and Lucy Moses Division of Montefiore Medical Center in 1981.
  - Children's Hospital at Montefiore
  - Weiler Division ("Einstein Hospital"), 1825 Eastchester Road, the Bronx. Opened as the Hospital of the Albert Einstein College of Medicine in 1966, renamed for Jack D. Weiler in 1979. Its daily operations have been run by Montefiore since 1969.
  - Wakefield Division, 600 East 233rd Street, the Bronx. Founded by the Congregation of the Sisters of Misericorde as Misericordia Hospital on Staten Island in 1887, moved to 531 East 86th Street in Manhattan in 1889, moved to its current location in 1958, renamed Our Lady of Mercy Hospital in 1985, acquired by Montefiore Medical Center in 2008 and renamed as their North Division, then renamed the Wakefield Division of Montefiore.
  - Westchester Square Medical Center, 2475 St. Raymond Avenue, the Bronx. Opened in 1930 as Westchester Square Hospital, closed in 2013, currently houses an emergency room, operating rooms, and offices for Montefiore Medical Center.
- North Central Bronx Hospital, 3424 Kossuth Avenue, the Bronx. Opened on October 25, 1976.
- St. Barnabas Hospital, 4422 Third Avenue, the Bronx. The first hospital for chronic diseases in the United States. Founded by the Reverend Washington Rodman in West Farms as the Home for the Incurables on April 6, 1866, moved to its present site in 1873, renamed St. Barnabas Hospital for Chronic Diseases in 1947, renamed St. Barnabas Health System in 2014. Became affiliated with the CUNY School of Medicine in 2016.

== Closed hospitals ==
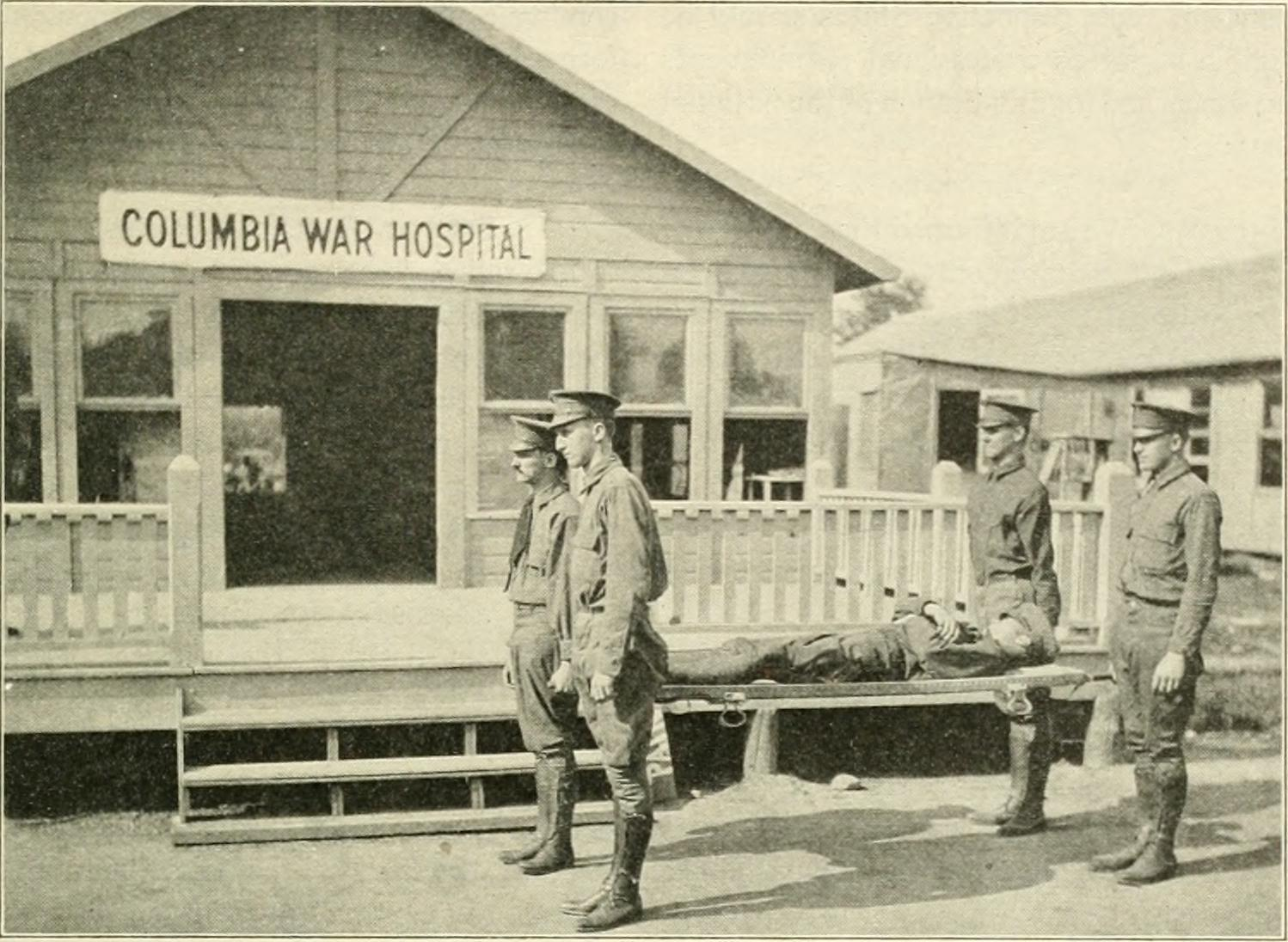
Columbia War Hospital (U.S. Army General Hospital No. 1)

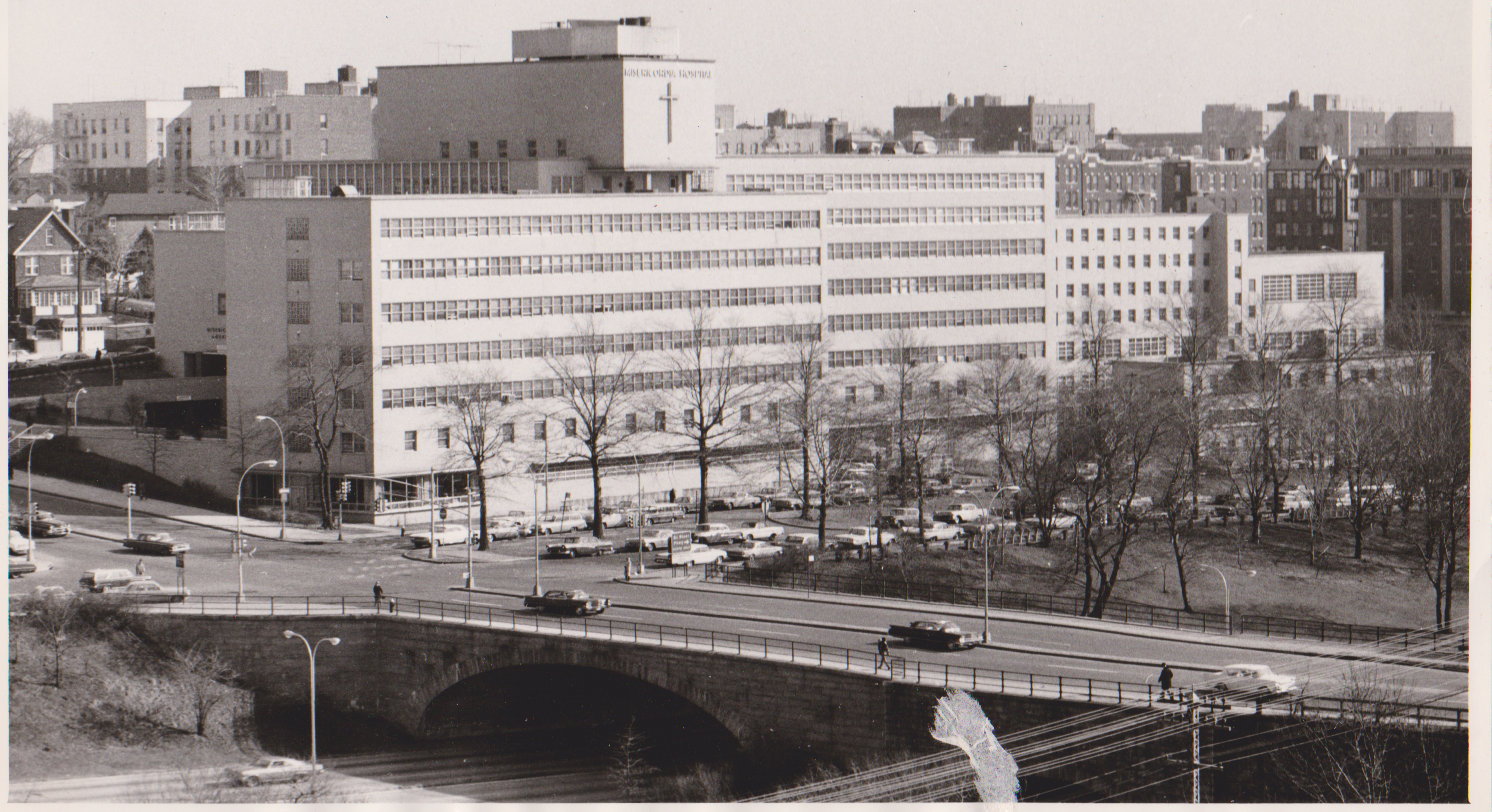
Misericordia Hospital

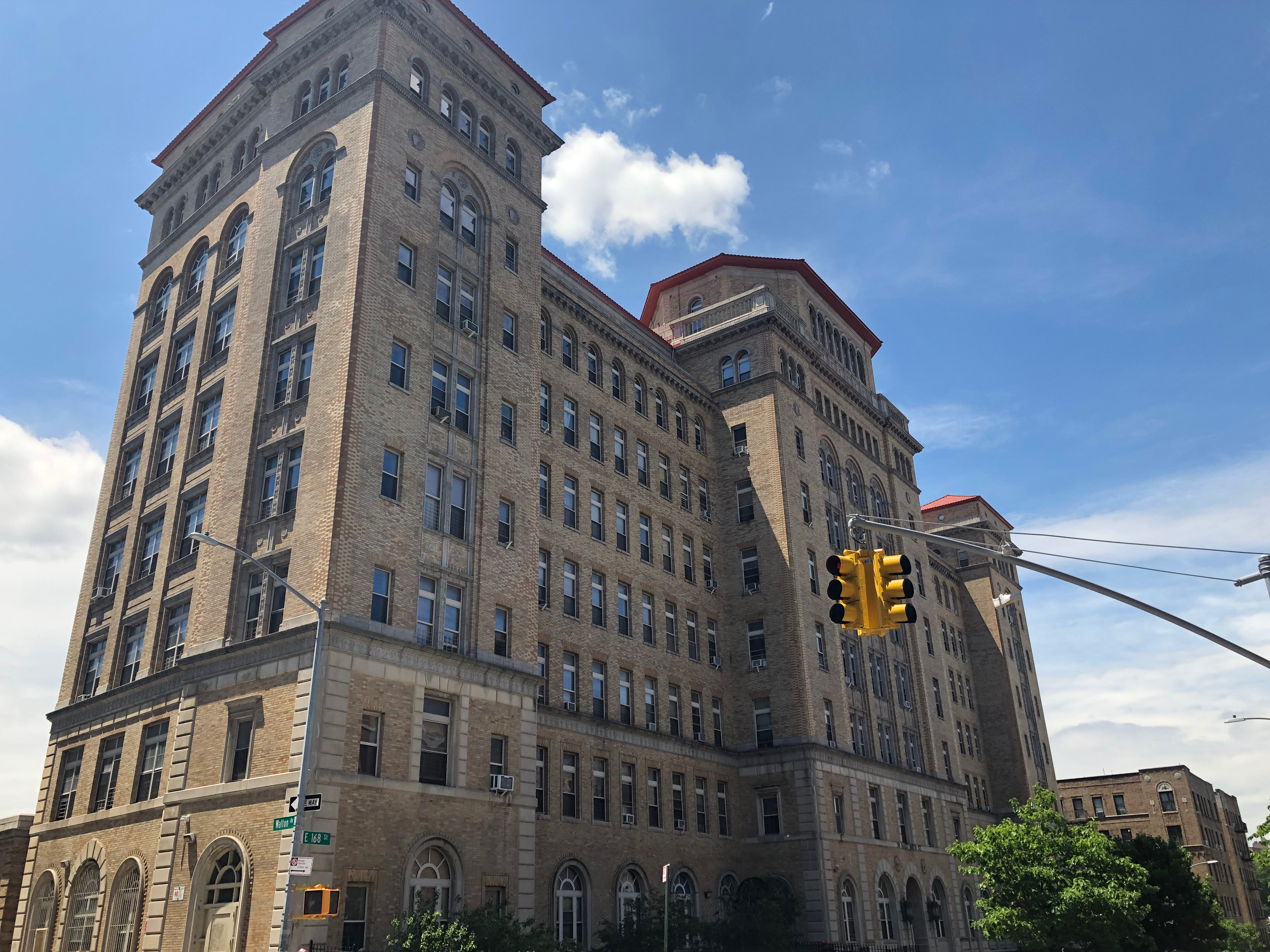
Morrisania Hospital

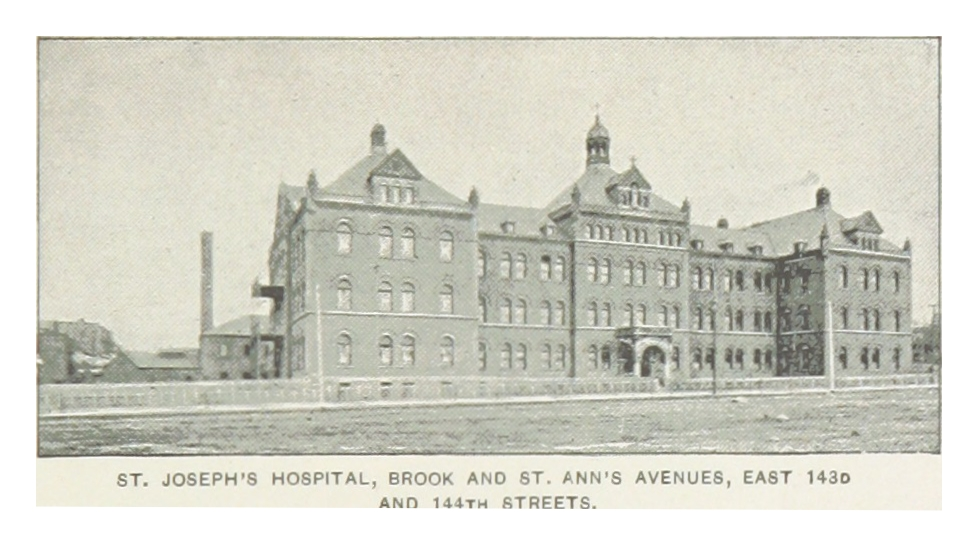
St. Joseph's Hospital, Brook & St. Anns Avenues, East 143rd & 144th streets

Includes former names of hospitals

=== A-B ===
- Black's Sanitarium, 1427 Zerega Avenue, the Bronx 10462. The site now contains 2005-built low-income housing.
- Bronx Area Station Hospital, 1650 Grand Concourse, the Bronx. Built as a new location for Lebanon Hospital and completed in 1943, but was used by the Army for its personnel and their wives and children from July 10, 1943 to September 30, 1945. Lebanon Hospital moved into the building in June 1946.
- Bronx Eye and Ear Hospital, 321 East Tremont Avenue, the Bronx. Opened as Bronx Eye and Ear Hospital on East 142nd Street prior to 1909, moved to 459-461 East 143rd Street in 1912 or 1913, moved to East Tremont Avenue on October 15, 1937, renamed Bronx Eye Hospital by 1968, unknown closing date.
- Bronx Hospital, 1276 Fulton Avenue, the Bronx. See the Fulton Division of Bronx-Lebanon Hospital Center, above.
- Bronx Maternity Hospital, 1072 Grand Concourse at 166th Street, the Bronx. Opened on October 31, 1931. Unknown closing date.
- Bronx Municipal Hospital Center, 1400 Pelham Parkway South, the Bronx. Opened in 1954. This was the name for Jacobi Medical Center and Van Etten Hospital as well as their associated buildings. The name fell out of use in the 1980s.
- Bronx Sanitarium, the Bronx
- Bryant Sanitarium, 1214 Hoe Avenue, the Bronx

=== C-F ===
- Central Maternity Hospital, 1831 Grand Concourse, the Bronx. Opened 1938. Closed 1958. Operated by Dr. Morris Leff.
- Columbia War Hospital, see U.S. Army General Hospital No. 1
- Concourse Hospital, the Bronx
- Convalescent Hospital, Hart Island, the Bronx (1877). Also see Hart Island (Bronx).
- Crotona Park Hospital, 1790 Marmion Avenue, the Bronx
- Dr. Bregman's Sanitarium, 1884 Marmion Avenue, the Bronx.
- Dr. Morris Leff Maternity Hospital, See Central Maternity Hospital.
- Elton Maternity Hospital, the Bronx.
- Fitch's Sanitarium, 123 West 183 Street, the Bronx. Founded in 1920, closed in the early 1960s, now University Heights Senior Housing.
- Fordham Hospital, Southern Boulevard and Crotona Avenue, the Bronx. Opened in 1892 on Valentine Avenue near Kingsbridge Road in 1892, moved to Aqueduct Avenue and St. James Place in 1898, moved to Southern Boulevard and Crotona Avenue on May 11, 1907, and closed on July 15, 1976. The site is now a parking lot.
- Franklin Maternity Sanitarium, 1355 Franklin Avenue, the Bronx.

=== G-O ===
- Halcyon Hospital, 754 Boston Road, the Bronx.
- House of the Holy Comforter, 2751 Grand Concourse, the Bronx. Founded in 1800.
- Hunts Point Hospital, Lafayette Avenue & Manida Street, the Bronx. Closed 1945.
- Lebanon Hospital, 1650 Grand Concourse, the Bronx. See the Concourse Division of Bronx-Lebanon Hospital Center, above.
- McDougall Hospital, at Fort Schuyler, the Bronx.
- Misericordia Hospital, 531 East 86th Street, Manhattan, and 600 East 233rd Street, the Bronx. Opened on Staten Island in 1887, moved to 531 East 86th Street in Manhattan in 1889, moved 600 East 233rd Street in the Bronx in 1958, renamed Our Lady of Mercy Hospital in 1985, acquired by Montefiore Medical Center in 2008 and renamed as their North Division, then renamed the Wakefield Division of Montefiore.
- Morrisania Hospital, 50 East 168th Street, the Bronx. Opened on July 1, 1929, and closed on June 30, 1976. Apartments.
- Mount Eden Hospital, 199 East Mount Eden Avenue, the Bronx. Razed in 2011.
- Our Lady of Mercy Medical Center, 600 East 233rd Street, the Bronx. Opened as Misericordia Hospital on Staten Island in 1887, moved to 531 East 86th Street in Manhattan in 1889, moved 600 East 233rd Street in the Bronx in 1958, renamed Our Lady of Mercy Hospital in 1985, acquired by Montefiore Medical Center and renamed as their North Division in 2008, then renamed the Wakefield Division of Montefiore.

=== P-S ===
- Parkchester General Hospital, 1424 Parker Street, the Bronx. Opened 1941, Closed on March 19, 1978. Building demolished, as of 2005 an eight-story senior residence.
- Pelham Bay General Hospital, 1870 Pelham Parkway South, the Bronx. Later Florence D’urso Pavilion of Our Lady of Mercy Medical Center. Now apartments.
- Prospect Hospital, 730 Kelly Street, the Bronx. Closed March 18, 1985. Now a homeless shelter. Prospect had opened there 1963.
- Royal Hospital, 2021 Grand Concourse, the Bronx. Now private medical offices.
- St. Francis Hospital, 525 East 142nd Street, the Bronx. Founded on May 1, 1865 by the Poor Sisters of St. Francis at 407-409 East 5th Street, then 609 East 5th Street in Manhattan, moved to the Bronx on March 15, 1906, closed on December 31, 1966. Demolished, replaced by apartments.
- St. Joseph's Hospital for Chest Diseases, Brook Avenue and East 143rd Street, the Bronx. Founded in 1882. Also called St Joseph's Hospital for Consumptives.
- Seton Hospital, Henry Hudson Parkway, Riverdale, the Bronx. Opened by the Sisters of Charity of St. Vincent's de Paul in 1895, sold to New York City in 1948, closed in 1955.

=== T-Z ===
- Union Hospital, 260 East 188th Street, the Bronx, now a community health center.
- University Heights Hospital, 74 West Tremont Ave, the Bronx.
- U.S. Army General Hospital No. 1, Gun Hill Road and Bainbridge Avenue, the Bronx. Also called Columbia War Hospital. Temporary structures erected as an emergency war hospital on property of Columbia University, with additional facilities in the Montefiore Home, the Messiah Home, the Camp Estate (all also in the Bronx), and Bloomingdale Hospital (in White Plains), and run by Columbia University from July 1917 to October 15, 1919.
- Van Etten Hospital, 1400 Pelham Parkway South, the Bronx. Opened in September 1954 as part of Bronx Municipal Hospital Center and named after Nathan Bristol van Etten, a physician who practiced nearby in the Bronx and was the first president of the Bronx County Medical Society and later became President of the American Medical Association. The building is now a teaching center for the Albert Einstein College of Medicine across the street, and houses the Bronx offices of the Chief Medical Examiner of New York City, a children's clinic, and a research center.
- Webb Sanitarium, 188th Street and Webb Avenue, the Bronx.
- West Eden Sanitarium, 71 West 174th Street, the Bronx.
- Woodlawn Sanitarium, 354 East 138th Street, the Bronx.
- Woodstock Hospital, the Bronx.

== See also ==
- List of hospitals in New York (state)
  - List of hospitals in New York City
    - List of hospitals in Brooklyn
    - List of hospitals in Manhattan
    - List of hospitals in Queens
    - List of hospitals in Staten Island
