= Safety net hospital =

Type of medical center in the United States

A safety-net hospital is a type of medical center in the United States that by legal obligation or mission provides healthcare for individuals regardless of their insurance status (the United States does not have a policy of universal health care) or ability to pay.

This legal mandate forces safety-net hospitals (SNHs) to serve all populations. Such hospitals typically serve a proportionately higher number of uninsured, Medicaid, Medicare, Children's Health Insurance Program (CHiP), low-income, and other vulnerable individuals than their "non-safety-net hospital" counterpart.

Safety-net hospitals are not defined by their ownership terms; they can be either publicly or privately owned. The mission of safety-net hospitals is rather to provide the best possible care for those who are barred from health care due to the various possible adverse circumstances. These circumstances mostly revolve around problems with financial payments, insurance plans, or health conditions. Safety-net hospitals are known for maintaining an open-door policy for their services.

Some safety-net hospitals even offer high-cost services like burn care, trauma care, neonatal treatments, and inpatient behavioral health. Some also provide training for healthcare professionals. The NYC Health + Hospitals in New York City , the John H. Stroger Jr. Hospital of Cook County (formerly the Cook County Health and Hospital System) in Chicago, and the Parkland Health & Hospital System in Dallas are three of the United States' largest safety-net hospitals.

== History ==
The presence of philanthropic medical institutions during the 19th century pre-date the modern American safety-net hospital. These hospitals were funded by religious groups or wealthy benefactors, and their target population was the poor. However, towards the turn of the century, these institutions began transitioning into for-profit organizations, as they began to accept patients from all socioeconomic backgrounds.

Towards 1922, as these businesses grew, revenue from patient care accounted for 65.2 percent of the total revenue for these community hospitals. Along with the introduction of private insurance, Medicare, and Medicaid during the 1980s, by the time 1994 arrived, 94 percent of the revenue came from patient care. However, in 1996, approximately forty-three million people (one-fifth of the U.S. population under age 65) had no medical insurance and an additional twenty-nine million were underinsured. These numbers were also expected to rise in the next decade.

This led to the advent of what we consider a safety-net hospital. Hospitals were already practicing uncompensated health care during the 1980s, with the help of state funding and disproportionate share hospital (DHS) programs, in order to provide medical treatment to the uninsured and the underinsured in urban cities. However, this practice became more commonplace when the state of health care began to look difficult.

== Financing a safety-net hospital ==
Safety-net hospitals oftentimes find themselves in difficult financial positions due to the vulnerable financial state of the patients and lack of sufficient federal, state and local funding; safety-net hospitals have high rates of Medicaid and Medicare payers (Medicaid has unreliable/insufficient processes of government-to-hospital repayment) and a large proportion of safety-net hospital patients serve traditionally low income and marginalized/vulnerable populations.

There is a complex array of public funding that comes to safety-net hospitals (as being legally defined as a safety-net hospital entitles these entities to financial compensation to overcome the cost of medical expenses not paid for by patients) mostly through Medicaid disproportionate share hospital payments, Medicaid Upper Payment Limit Payments, Medicaid Indirect Medical Education Payments, and state/local indigent health programs. However, these financial entities created to sustain safety-net hospitals in repayments are often not enough.

According to the National Rural Health Association, eighty-three rural hospitals have closed since 2010 due to the substantial financial pressure. In 2013, hospitals across the United States generated $44.6 billion in uncompensated care costs; uncompensated care costs are costs accrued from services that the hospitals provided to patients that were not able to pay and that also went unpaid by government entities. Additionally, there tends to be a lack of socioeconomic development and a lack of health care providers (both general and specialized) in the geographical regions where safety-net hospitals tend to be located; this observation is made by Waitzkin and he refers to these facts as part of the social and structural "contradictions" that safety-net hospitals face further negatively impact there financial stability and care performance.

Besides, many of the level I trauma centers are within safety-net hospitals and their financial stability is highly affected by policy changes. In a study, they found that county SNHs were the last in net revenue income compared to non-profit SNHs and non-SNHs ($41.6 million vs $111.4 million vs $287.1 million, respectively). Although ACA has changed the financial situation of SNHs, county SNHs still faced a negative margins in 2015. However, for many hospital types, the net patient revenue increased.

=== Prospects for safety-net hospitals under the Patient Protection and Affordable Care Act ===
Under statute, Medicaid and Medicare issue disproportionate share hospital (DSH) payments that offset hospitals' expenditures for uncompensated care. These payments are intended to improve access for Medicaid recipients and uninsured patients, as well as to shore up the financial stability of safety-net hospitals. Prior to the Patient Protection and Affordable Care Act (ACA, also known as "Obamacare"), the Medicare portion of the program has already been limited, and under the ACA the Medicaid portion of the program is also scheduled to be restricted.

This was built into the law under the assumption that the amount of uncompensated care would decline substantially under the ACA due to expanded coverage. However, coverage did not expand as much as anticipated in many states due to the unanticipated choice not to expand Medicaid access under the Act (a result of National Federation of Independent Business v. Sebelius).

An additional issue with Obamacare and safety-net hospitals arises from the coverage gap for those who have too high of an income to qualify for Medicaid but have too low of an income to afford a private plan; it is projected that even with the implementation of the health care law in 2016, roughly thirty million people are still expected to be without insurance coverage and find service in safety-net hospitals. Another issue revolves around the fact that hospitals are required to provide care for patients in the emergency department, even if the person cannot pay or is an illegal immigrant.

=== Safety-net hospitals under the Trump Administration ===
The American Health Care Act of 2017 (AHCA), if passed, would have repealed part of the Patient Protection and Affordable Care Act in such that it would have cut Medicaid coverage for lower-income Americans and effectively stopped ACA's Medicaid expansion, which was projected to result in loss of coverage for twenty-four million people by 2026. In addition, it would have placed a limit on federal funding that states could receive to cover health insurance to millions of low-income patients.

These federal cuts and increased enrollment criteria for federal welfare programs were projected to create an inevitable cost shift on patients and make it more difficult for Americans to be able to participate and receive aid from federal programs. Less money allocated to federal programs and the simultaneous repeals to Obamacare was expected to lead to less patients receiving financial help and qualifying for insurance programs, meaning that they would have had to pay more out of pocket for any services received. It was estimated that there would be fifteen million fewer individuals insured with "Trumpcare" than with Obamacare.

This was expected to directly impact safety-net hospitals because of increases in the number of patients without insurance and decreased financial support from the federal government. The aforementioned proposed act was criticized for its potential to increase financial burdens and operational constraints on both patients and safety-net hospitals.

It was predicted that under the AHCA, hospitals in both expanded Medicaid and nonexpanded states would have negative operating margins by 2026, endangering the quality of patient care for low-income communities, and ultimately, threatening hospital closures. The act failed to pass in the United States Senate.

== Types of safety-net providers ==
=== Federally Qualified Health Centers (FQHCs) ===
Federally Qualified Health Centers are public and private non-profit health-care organizations that meet federally mandated requirements to provide comprehensive and appropriate health care services to medically underserved populations. They must also adjust service fees to patient capacity to pay, have an ongoing qualify-assurance program, and have a governing board of directors.

In turn, FQHCs receive reimbursements from Medicaid through their Prospective Payment System (PPS). They can also apply for the Health Center Program grant from the U.S. Department of Health and Human Resources and Services Administration.

=== Federally Qualified Health Center Look-Alikes (FQHC look-alikes) ===
FQHCs that meet all the federal health-center-program requirements but do not receive health-center grant funding are called FQHC look-alikes. These FQHCs are typically non-profit community health centers and regional clinical associations.

=== Rural health centers ===
Rural health centers (RHC) are public, private, or non-profit health centers that provide primary care to Medicaid and Medicare populations in rural areas. RHC status is designated by the Centers for Medicare and Medicaid Services, providing enhanced reimbursements rates for services. A health center cannot be both an RHC and a FQHC.

=== Disproportionate share hospitals (DSH) ===
Disproportionate share hospitals are characterized by a significantly high number of low-income patients that is disproportionate. These hospitals do not receive payment for their services and are not reimbursed by Medicare, Medical, health insurance, or the Children's Health Insurance Program.

States submit independent certified audits along with an annual report detailing their payments to each DSH. After doing so, the states receive Federal Financial Participation (FFP), an annual allotment.

=== Community health centers ===
Community health centers are clinics with a mission to provide care to low-income populations regardless of their ability to pay. However, they do not have to meet any federal requirements because they do not receive federal funding or reimbursements from Medicare or Medicaid. They usually operate through donations.

== List of safety-net hospitals in the United States ==
=== Alabama ===
- DCH Regional Health System
- East Alabama Medical Center - Lanier
- Princeton Baptist Medical Center
- St. Vincent's East Hospital
- UAB Hospital

=== Arizona ===
- Valleywise Health (Formerly Maricopa Integrated Health System)
- Northern Arizona Healthcare
  - Flagstaff Medical Center
  - Verde Valley Medical Center
- Yuma Regional Medical Center

=== Arkansas ===
- University of Arkansas for Medical Sciences

=== California ===
The twenty-one hospitals that are a part of California's health-care safety-net system is represented by the California Association of Public Hospitals and Health Systems. These twenty-one hospitals are six percent of all the hospitals in California but provide care for eighty percent of the state's population. Forty percent of their total hospital services is for uninsured patients and thirty-five percent is for Medicaid Patients.

- Alameda Health System
  - Alameda Hospital
  - Fairmont Hospital
  - Highland Hospital
  - John George Psychiatric Hospital
  - San Leandro Hospital
- Arrowhead Regional Medical Center
- City and County of San Francisco Department of Public Health
  - Laguna Honda Hospital and Rehabilitation Center
  - Zuckerberg San Francisco General Hospital and Trauma Center
- Contra Costa Regional Medical Center
- Kern Medical
- Los Angeles County Department of Health Services
  - Antelope Valley Medical Center
  - Children's Hospital Los Angeles
  - Harbor-UCLA Medical Center
  - High Desert Regional Health Center
  - LAC + USC Medical Center
  - Olive View-UCLA Medical Center
  - Rancho Los Amigos National Rehabilitation Center
- Natividad Medical Center
- Riverside University Health System - Medical Center
- San Joaquin GeneralHospital
- San Mateo Medical Center
- Santa Clara Valley Health & Hospital System
  - Santa Clara Valley Medical Center
- University of California
  - Shiley Eye Center
  - UC Davis Medical Center
  - UC Irvine Medical Center
  - UC San Diego Health System
  - UCSF Benioff Children's Hospital
  - UCSF Medical Center at Mount Zion
- Ventura County Health Care Agency
  - Santa Paula Hospital
  - Ventura County Medical Center

=== Colorado ===
- Denver Health Medical Center

=== Connecticut ===
- Stamford Health

=== Delaware ===
- Christiana Care Health Systems

=== District of Columbia ===
- Children's National Hospital
- Howard University Hospital
- MedStar Washington Hospital Center

=== Florida ===
- Baycare Health System
- Broward Health
- Halifax Health
- Health Care District of Palm Beach County
- Jackson Health System
- Lawnwood Hospital of Fort Pierce
- Lee Health
- Memorial Healthcare System
- Orlando Health
- Tampa General Hospital
- University of Florida Health
  - UF Health Jacksonville
  - UF Health Shands Children's Hospital
  - UF Health Shands Hospital
  - UF Health Shands Psychiatric Hospital
  - UF Health Shands Rehab Hospital

=== Georgia ===
- Grady Health System
- Atrium Health Navicent Medical Center
- Augusta University Medical Center
- South Georgia Medical Center

=== Idaho ===
- St. Luke's Health System

=== Illinois ===
- Ascension St. Mary Chicago
- Cook County Health & Hospital System
- Jackson Park Hospital & Medical Center
- Norwegian American Hospital
- Sinai Health System
- The University of Chicago Medicine
  - Bernard Mitchell Hospital
  - Comer Children's Hospital
- University of Illinois Hospital & Health Sciences System
- Roseland Community Hospital
- Loretto Hospital
- Humboldt Park Health
- Insight Hospital and Medical Center

=== Indiana ===
- Health and Hospital Corporation of Marion County
- Indiana University Health
- Eskenazi Health

=== Iowa ===
- Broadlawns Medical Center

=== Kansas ===
- The University of Kansas Health System

=== Kentucky ===
- UK HealthCare

=== Louisiana ===
- University Medical Center New Orleans

=== Maryland ===
- Bon Secours Hospital

=== Massachusetts ===
- Baystate Health Medical Center
- Boston Medical Center
- Cambridge Health Alliance
- Signature Healthcare Brockton Hospital
- UMass Memorial Health Care
- Merrimack Health

=== Michigan ===
- Henry Ford Allegiance Health
- Hurley Medical Center

=== Minnesota ===
- Hennepin County Medical Center
- Regions Hospital HealthPartners

=== Mississippi ===
- The University of Mississippi Health Care

=== Missouri ===
- Saint Louis University Hospital
- Truman Medical Centers
- University of Missouri Health Care

=== Montana ===
- Benefis Health System

=== Nebraska ===
- Nebraska Medicine

=== Nevada ===
- University Medical Center of Southern Nevada

=== New Jersey ===
- Carepoint Health
- Cooper Norcross Health Care
- RWJBarnabas Health
- St. Joseph's Regional Medical Center
- University Hospital

=== New Mexico ===
- University of New Mexico Hospital

=== New York ===
- Brooklyn Hospital Center
- Erie County Medical Center
- Nassau University Medical Center (NuHealth)
- NYC Health + Hospitals
  - Bellevue
  - Elmhurst
  - Harlem
  - Jacobi
  - Kings County
  - Lincoln
  - Metropolitan
  - North Central Bronx
  - Queens
  - South Brooklyn
  - Woodhull
- One Brooklyn Health
  - Brookdale University Hospital and Medical Center
  - Interfaith Medical Center
  - Kingsbrook Jewish Medical Center
- St. Barnabas Hospital
- St. John's Episcopal Hospital
- SUNY Downstate Medical Center
- Westchester Medical Center
- Wyckoff Heights Medical Center

=== North Carolina ===
- Atrium Health
- Vidant Health
- WakeMedHealth & Hospitals
- UNC Health

=== Ohio ===
- Cleveland Clinic Foundation (some affiliated hospitals, not the main hospital)
- Summa Health Systems
- The MetroHealth System
- The Ohio State University Wexner Medical Center
- UC Health

=== Oregon ===
- Oregon Health & Science University

=== Pennsylvania ===
- Einstein Healthcare Network
- Temple Health

=== Rhode Island ===
- Care New England Health System
- Rhode Island Hospital

=== South Carolina ===
- Prisma Health
- Medical University of South Carolina - University Hospital
- Spartanburg Regional Healthcare System

=== Tennessee ===
- Erlanger Health System
- Nashville General Hospital at Meharry
- Regional One Health
- University of Tennessee Medical Center

=== Texas ===
- Harris Health System
- JPS Health Network
- Parkland Health & Hospital System
- The University of Texas Medical Branch
- University Health System
- University Medical Center of El Paso
- UT Health Northeast

=== Utah ===
- University of Utah Health Care

=== Vermont ===
- UVM Health Network

=== Virginia ===
- Carilion Clinic
- University of Virginia Health System
- Virginia Commonwealth University Health System

=== Washington ===
- UW Medicine - Harborview Medical Center
- Mason General Hospital

=== West Virginia ===
- West Virginia University Medicine
  - Berkeley MedicalCenter
  - Camden Clark Medical Center
  - Chestnut Ridge Center
  - Jefferson Medical Center
  - Ruby Memorial Hospital
  - United Hospital Center
  - WVU Children's hospital

== Patient experience in safety-net hospitals ==
Studies have shown that safety-net hospitals, when compared to non-safety-net hospitals (and other health-care institutions), do not perform as well in overall patient-care and patient-experience ratings. In response to these critiques, some safety-net hospitals have begun to offer customer-service trainings, conduct employee evaluations and advocate for policy changes that could improve the patient experience.

Hospitals are trying to increase their compassion and quality of care in order to satisfy patient experiences. Patients with a satisfying care experience are more likely to recommend hospitals to others.

== See also ==
- Lists of hospitals in the United States
