= Alperstein =

Alperstein (Jewish (Ashkenazic): variant of Halpern with the addition of German stein "rock") is a surname. Notable people with the surname include:

- Avraham Eliezer Alperstein (1853–1917), American Orthodox rabbi
- Paul Alperstein, founder the American Wrestling Federation

== See also ==
- Alberstein
