= Pelham Bay General Hospital =

Defunct hospital in The Bronx/NYC, subsequently a nursing home

Florence D’urso Pavilion of Our Lady of Mercy Medical Center
- Our Lady of Mercy Medical Center

Geography
- Location: The Bronx, New York, United States
- Coordinates: 40.85554712161185°N 73.83073603211359°W

Organization
- Care system: Private
- Religious affiliation: (Originally) Roman Catholicism

History
- Former name: Pelham Bay General Hospital
- Opened: 1960
- Closed: 2008

Links
- Lists: Hospitals in New York State
- Other links: Hospitals in The Bronx

Pelham Bay General Hospital (now defunct) was a 1960-built Bronx hospital that became the Florence D’urso Pavilion of Our Lady of Mercy Medical Center. Following 2007 financial failure of the latter, the five story building, after being vacant for many years, was converted to housing units.

== Post hospital building use ==
"It had been Pelham Bay General Hospital for years" and then D'urso Pavilion of former Our Lady of Mercy Medical Center." After renovatations in 2008, it was transformed into housing units using the name Pelham Grand. By mid 2014 more than 20 units were occupied.
