= Royal Hospital (New York City) =

Defunct Bronx hospital

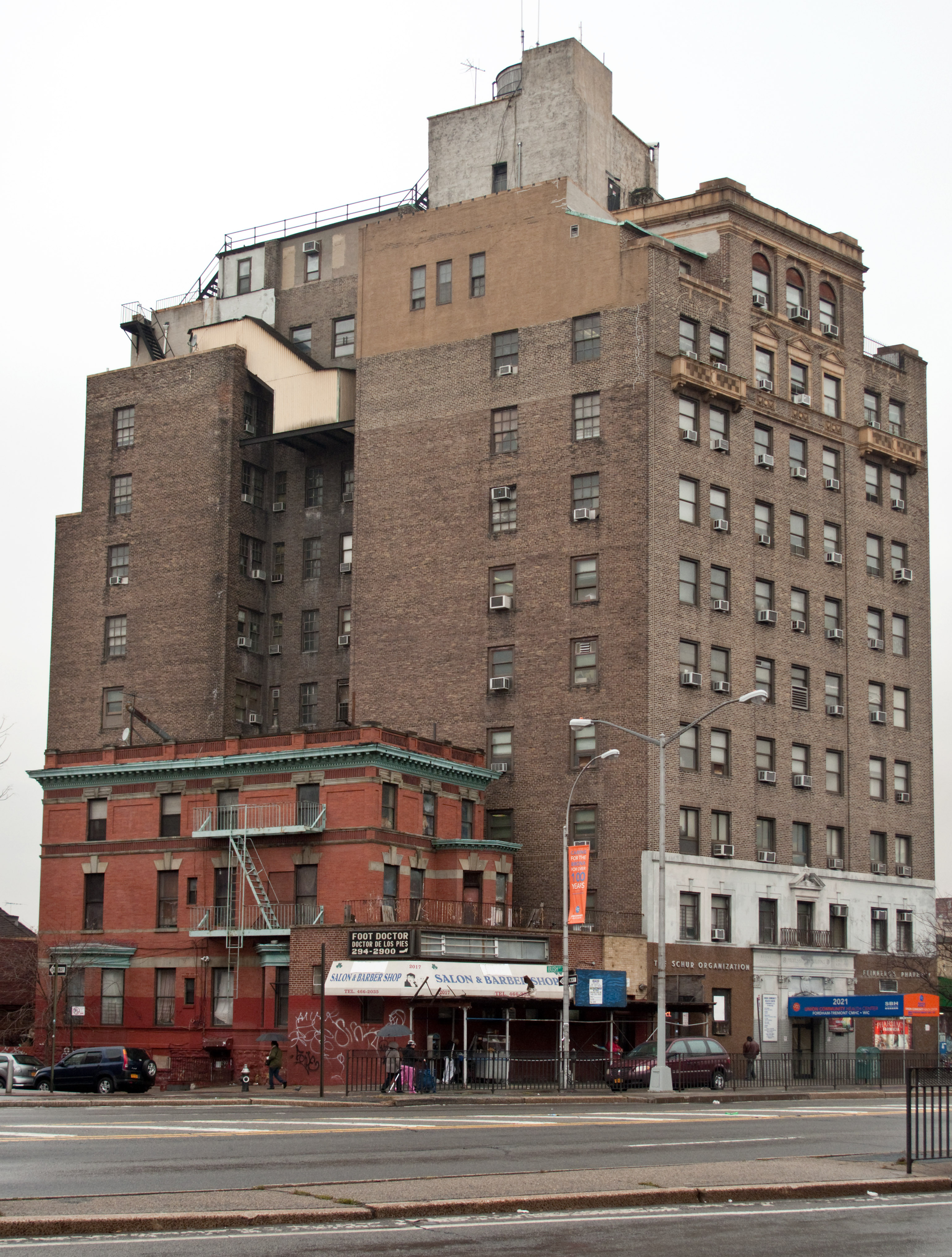
- "The Professional Building", site of the former Royal Hospital, in 2012

Geography
- Location: 2021 Grand Concourse, Bronx, New York, United States
- Coordinates: 40.8519°N 73.9044°W

Services
- Beds: 91

History
- Opened: Before February, 1942
- Closed: After October, 1975

Links
- Lists: Hospitals in New York State
- Other links: List of hospitals in the Bronx

Royal Hospital was a medical facility housed in a privately owned New York City structure called the Professional Building.

== History ==
Royal Hospital, at 2021 Grand Concourse, Bronx, New York, 10453, was a 91-bed private hospital. In 1942 it was owned by Dr. Morris A. Mason.

By the mid-1970s, as the neighborhood declined, the focus of the hospital was increasingly abortions; New York Magazine wrote in 1973 that the hospital had been "completely remodeled in the past eight years" but concluded that it had "seen better days."
