= BronxCare Hospital System =

BronxCare Health System
- BronxCare Health System

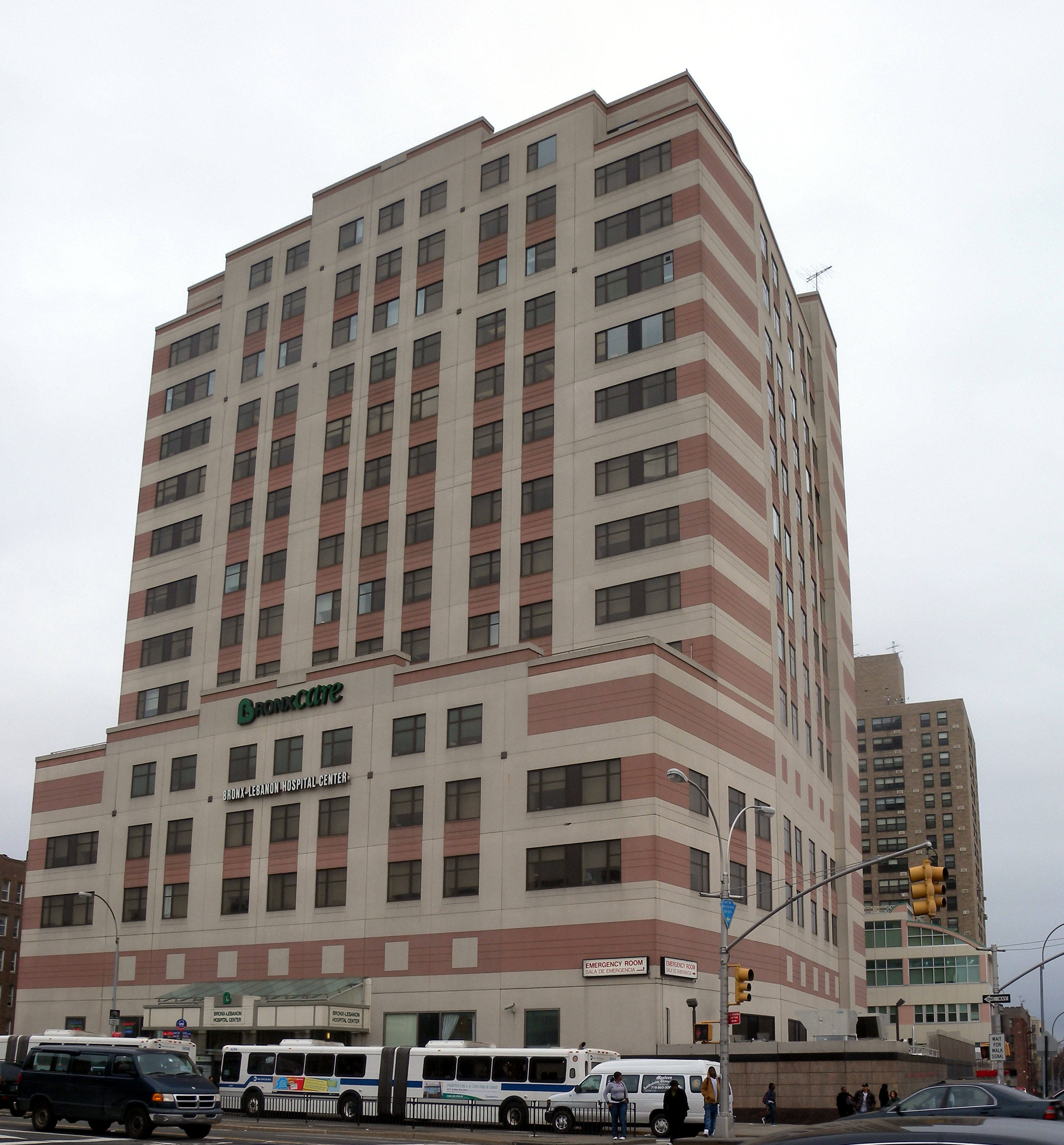

Geography
- Location: 1650 Grand Concourse, The Bronx, New York, United States
- Coordinates: 40.8435°N 73.9108°W

Organization
- Care system: Private
- Type: Teaching
- Affiliated university: Mount Sinai School of Medicine

Services
- Standards: Joint Commission
- Emergency department: Yes
- Beds: 859

History
- Former names: Lebanon Hospital (1890); Bronx Hospital (1911); Bronx-Lebanon Hospital Center (merger, 1962)

Links
- Website: www.bronxcare.org
- Lists: Hospitals in New York State
- Other links: Hospitals in The Bronx

The BronxCare Health System, previously known as "Bronx-Lebanon Hospital Center", is a hospital in the Bronx, New York City. It was founded as the Lebanon Hospital by Jonas Weil in 1890. In 1962, Lebanon Hospital merged with Bronx Hospital, and since 2016, the combined center has served as a teaching hospital for Mount Sinai School of Medicine.

== History ==
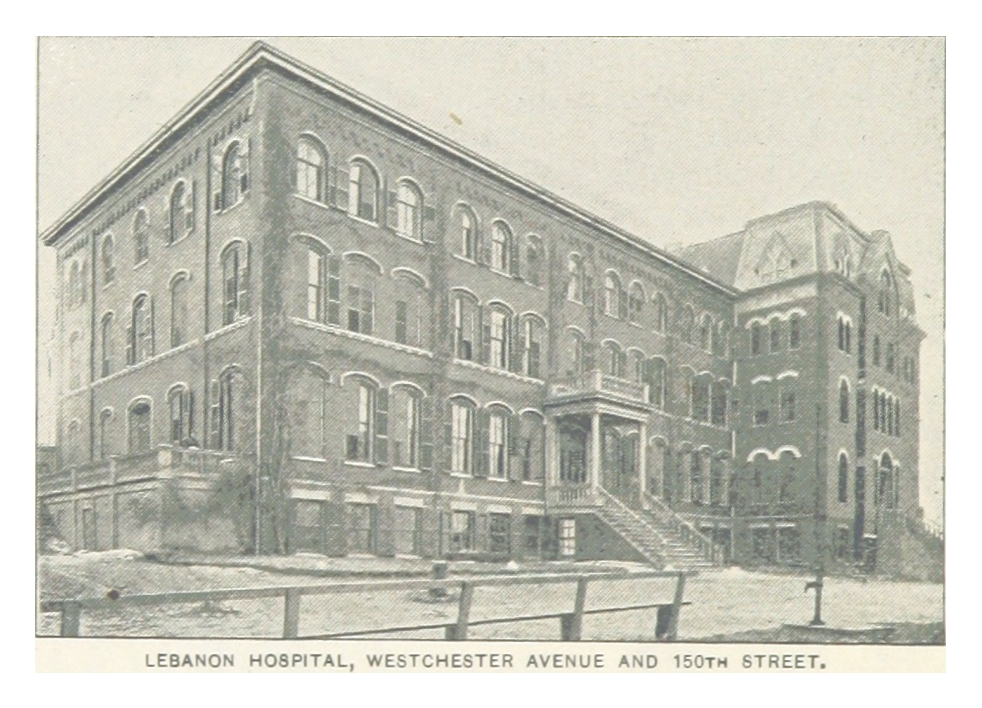
Lebanon Hospital, 1893

=== Lebanon Hospital ===
The current hospital center owes its origins to the immigration of European Jews in the late 19th century that caused an even greater strain on the area's hospitals. Jonas Weil, after a poor experience in trying to obtain treatment for a friend decided to look for a solution to this problem. The first step in this process was the creation of the Lebanon Hospital Association via his own donation of $10,175. Further monies followed from others, and the Lebanon Hospital was chartered in 1890 and opened in 1893 at the corner of Westchester Avenue and 151st Street. A nursing school was added in 1894, and several expansions followed that coincided with continued population growth in the region.

Finally, Lebanon Hospital moved to a newer building on Grand Concourse at Mount Eden Parkway in 1946. During World War II, it had served as "the Army's Bronx Area Station Hospital."

=== Bronx Hospital ===
The Bronx Hospital, meanwhile, was founded in 1911 to meet the healthcare needs of the growing South Bronx community and was caring for more than 30,000 patients per year within its first seven years of operation. The operational team of the new hospital purchased the Eichler estate on Fulton Avenue and turned the home into a 110-bed hospital. Within an additional seven years, the local population grew further, necessitating a 310-bed hospital.

=== 1950s and 1962 merger ===
By the time the 1950s had drawn to a close, the two hospital boards shared staff and resources in order to serve the needs of the Bronx's still-growing population, and Bronx-Lebanon Hospital Center was created in 1962. The current center consists of two major facilities: one at the Lebanon Hospital Grand Concourse site, a 17-story tower that provides medical, specialty, outpatient and emergency services; and one on Bronx Hospital's Fulton site, now a psychiatric and substance abuse program and a 240-bed skilled nursing facility. The hospital's promise is that it does not turn anyone away, although it has come under scrutiny due to its billing practices that left some patients facing large bills.

=== BronxCare ===
On December 6, 2017, the organization's name was changed from Bronx-Lebanon Hospital Center to BronxCare Health System. In addition to the hospital on the Grand Concourse and the building that houses the psychiatric and substance abuse program and the skilled nursing facility, BronxCare has more than 30 ambulatory medical practices throughout the community.

=== 2017 attack ===
At approximately 3 p.m. on June 30, 2017, gunman Dr. Henry William Bello, a doctor who left Bronx-Lebanon after sexual harassment complaints, entered the building with an AR-15 rifle concealed under a lab coat. He attempted to locate a female target, then shot other medical staff, killing one doctor and wounding six other people. Approximately one hour later police found him dead from a self-inflicted gunshot wound.
