= Union Hospital (The Bronx, N.Y.) =

Geography
- Location: The Bronx, New York, United States
- Coordinates: 40.8605°N 73.8959°W

History
- Opened: 1922
- Closed: 1983

Links
- Lists: Hospitals in New York State
- Other links: List of hospitals in the Bronx

Union Hospital was located in The Bronx.

== History ==
It opened in 1922 and, after it closed, the building was repurposed as a community health center. In 1983, Union was taken over by St Barnabas, a nearby hospital, and "turned into an ambulatory care clinic."
