= Webb Sanitarium =

Defunct Bronx hospital

Geography
- Location: 2400 Webb Avenue, (188th Street & Webb Avenue), Fordham, The Bronx, New York, United States
- Coordinates: 40.8640°N 73.9068°W

Organization
- Care system: Private
- Type: General

Links
- Lists: Hospitals in New York State
- Other links: List of hospitals in the Bronx

Webb Sanitarium was a Bronx hospital that expanded in 1938. Even prior to that, Webb (located at 188th Street and Webb Avenue) served as a general hospital, including medical/surgical and maternity services.

== Notable deaths ==
- Edward J. Walsh
