= Central Maternity Hospital =

Defunct Bronx hospital

Geography
- Location: The Bronx, New York, United States
- Coordinates: 40.8477°N 73.9081°W

Organization
- Type: Specialist

Services
- Speciality: Maternity hospital

History
- Opened: 1938
- Closed: 1958

Links
- Lists: Hospitals in New York State
- Other links: List of hospitals in the Bronx

Central Maternity Hospital was a Bronx hospital which opened 1938 and closed 1958. It was operated by Dr. Morris Leff, who initially called his facility Dr. Morris Leff Maternity Hospital.

== Controversy ==
Dr. Morris Leff Maternity Hospital was the first name used, "in the days when doctors ran their own hospitals." Although Leff "was carted off to jail for carrying out abortions" his notoriety also included baby-selling, sourcing the babies from unwed mothers. The New York Times headlined "Dr. Leff Pleads Not Guilty."
