= Woodlawn Sanitarium =

Defunct Bronx hospital

Geography
- Location: 354 East 238th Street, Woodlawn Heights, Bronx, New York, United States
- Coordinates: 40°53′59.12″N 73°51′55.64″W

Links
- Lists: Hospitals in New York State
- Other links: List of hospitals in the Bronx

Woodlawn Sanitarium (referred to as Woodlawn Sanitarium, Inc. by the NYC Municipal Civil Service Commission) was an early 20th century hospital located in the Woodlawn section of The Bronx.

In 1936, the hospital's president, Dr. Arthur F. Cody apparently committed suicide.
