= Mount Eden Hospital =

Razed defunct hospital in The Bronx/NYC

Geography
- Location: Bronx, New York, United States
- Coordinates: 40°50′36″N 73°54′35″W

Organization
- Type: General

History
- Demolished: 2011

Links
- Lists: Hospitals in New York State
- Other links: Hospitals in The Bronx

Mount Eden Hospital (also known as Mt. Eden Hospital or Mt. Eden General Hospital) was located in the Bronx; it was razed in 2011. The BronxCare Health and Wellness Center, an outpatient medical facility, now exists at that location.
