= Hunts Point Hospital =

Defunct Bronx hospital

Geography
- Location: Lafayette Avenue & Manida Street, Hunts Point, Bronx, New York, United States
- Coordinates: 40.81672°N 73.88953°W

Organization
- Type: Community

Services
- Beds: 100

Links
- Lists: Hospitals in New York State
- Other links: Hospitals in the Bronx

Hunts Point Hospital was a 100-bed Bronx hospital that closed, and was sold in 1945; the building was subsequently abandoned.

They had served the local community for general medical/surgical and maternity needs.

== Controversy ==
The NYC Fire Commissioner disclosed that the hospital allegedly refused "to admit a 6-year-old boy who was dying from electric burns and shock."

The hospital closed months later, and its building was sold.

Twenty years prior to this boy's death another allegation was made regarding claims by a nurse about plans for starving to death a girl born mentally weak.
