= Robert H. Goetz =

American surgeon

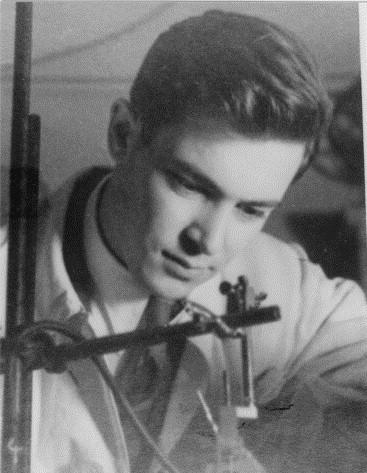
Robert Hans Goetz

Robert Hans Goetz (17 April 1910, Frankfurt – 15 December 2000, Scarsdale, New York) was the surgeon who performed the first successful clinical (i.e., human) coronary artery bypass graft surgery. The surgery was performed May 2, 1960 using the left internal thoracic artery. The graft remained patent, as demonstrated by angiography, and the patient remained free of angina for one year. While names such as Michael Debakey, Christiaan Barnard (a student of Goetz in Cape Town), and others are well known, Goetz gained little recognition.

Goetz was associate professor of surgery at the Albert Einstein College of Medicine in 1957 and later professor of surgery at Bronx Municipal Hospital in 1961. He retired in 1982.
