= Bronx Eye and Ear Hospital =

Defunct Bronx specialty hospital

Geography
- Location: The Bronx, New York, United States

Organization
- Type: Specialist

Services
- Speciality: Eye and ear hospital

History
- Opened: about 1909
- Closed: closed

Links
- Lists: Hospitals in New York State
- Other links: List of hospitals in the Bronx

Bronx Eye and Ear Hospital was a hospital already using that name in 1909. The New York Times headlined about them in 1937 "Most Complete in World." They moved more than once, and renamed as Bronx Eye Hospital by 1968. The hospital has since closed.

== History ==
They acquired a new facility in 1912. Their locations, all in The Bronx, included:

- East 142nd Street
- 459-161 East 143rd Street
- 321 East Tremont Avenue

The New York Times reported in 1939 that the prior year, having opened in what was to be their final location, the hospital "had 19,472 patients."

NYC building records of 2021 show the long since closed hospital's building serving as an infirmary.
