= Misericordia Hospital =

Hospital in the Bronx, New York

Montefiore Wakefield Hospital
- Montefiore Health System

Geography
- Location: Wakefield, The Bronx, New York, United States
- Coordinates: 40.89400710435465°N 73.86099485269823°W

Organization
- Care system: Private
- Type: Teaching
- Religious affiliation: (Originally) Roman Catholicism
- Affiliated university: Albert Einstein College of Medicine

History
- Former names: Misericordia Hospital (1887)); Our Lady of Mercy Hospital (1985); Our Lady of Mercy Medical Center (1985); Montefiore Medical Center North Division (2008)
- Opened: 1887; 139 years ago (Staten Island); 1889 (Yorkville, Manhattan); 1955; 71 years ago (Wakefield, Bronx)

Links
- Website: www.montefiore.org/wakefield
- Lists: Hospitals in New York State
- Other links: Hospitals in The Bronx

Misericordia Hospital is a 3-block medical center in the Bronx, New York City. It opened in 1887 in Staten Island, moved to Manhattan in 1889, and moved to The Bronx in 1958. The hospital was renamed Our Lady of Mercy Hospital in 1985, acquired by Montefiore Medical Center in 2008 and renamed as their North Division, then renamed the Wakefield Division of Montefiore. Misericordia is a not-for-profit voluntary teaching hospital.

== History ==
There are other hospitals that use the Misericordia name. This one originated well over a century ago. They share the word misericorde which the New York Times translates to English as mercy.

=== Staten Island ===
"Six Roman Catholic Sisters of Misercorde with a capital of $1" opened Misericordia Hospital in 1887 in "a tumble-down old residence on Staten Island."

=== Manhattan ===
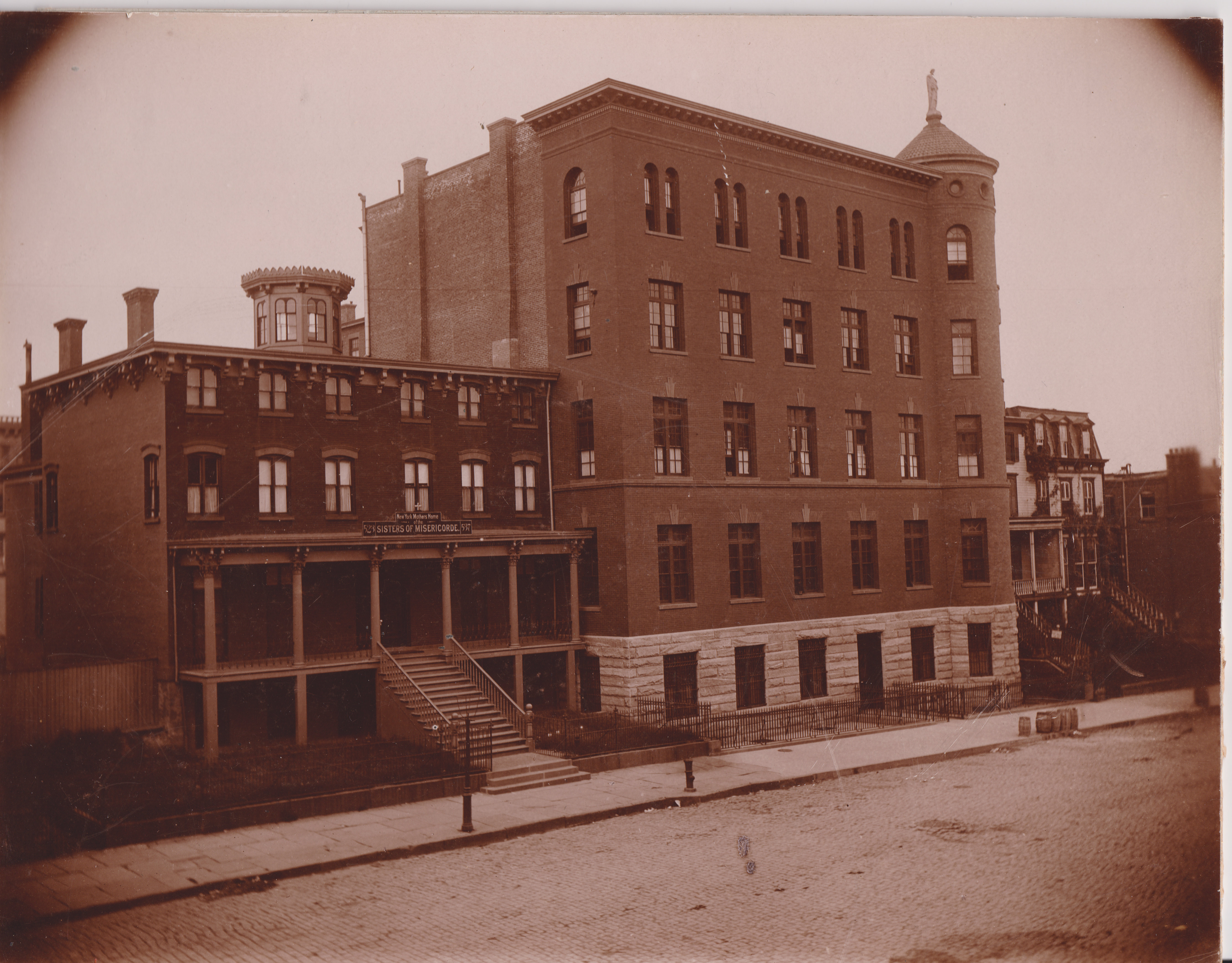
Misericordia Hospital at 86th Street in Manhattan.

The hospital moved from Staten Island to Manhattan in 1889. The facility's mailing address was 531 East 86th Street, New York City in the Yorkville, Manhattan neighborhood.

=== The Bronx ===
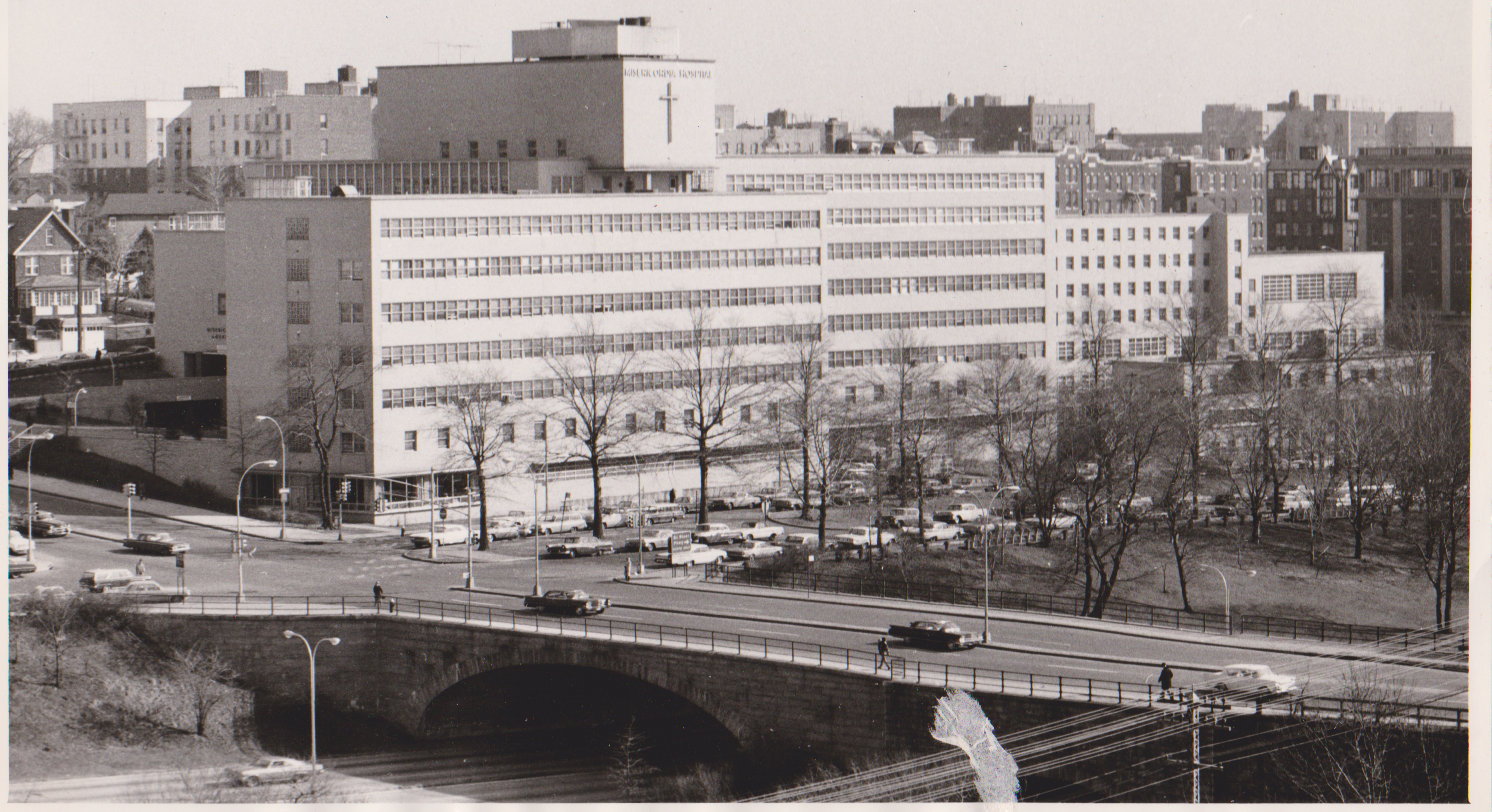
Misericordia Hospital, in The Bronx

In 1955 the hospital announced that it had purchased land in the Bronx and was beginning construction of a modern 3-block medical center. Their 531 East Eighty-sixth Street building in Manhattan was sold, via a real-estate agent, to "erect a tall apartment house on the site."

The reported $9 million construction costs were higher than the $7,250,000 that had been announced 3 years prior.

=== Renamings ===
Beginning in 1985 the hospital underwent a series of name changes:

- 1985: Our Lady of Mercy Hospital / Our Lady of Mercy Medical Center
- 2008: acquired by Montefiore Medical Center
  - renamed as their North Division
  - then renamed the Wakefield Division of Montefiore.

== Affiliation ==
Beginning in 1963, Misericordia had "an affiliation agreement, whereby it supplies medical personnel to Fordham." In 1971 this led to Misericordia letting go "85 physicians and other personnel assigned to Fordham Hospital under an affiliation contract, because of what it described as a $1.4-million cutback by the city's Health and Hospitals corporation." Another affiliation, this time with Lincoln Hospital, began in 1976. That same year, New York City's Health and Hospitals Corporation "questioned the large proportion of foreign-trained physicians on the Misericordia staff, in the belief that training in the United States was generally superior." In 1979 these doctors unionized.

== Controversy ==
Since Lincoln Hospital's doctors were supplied by Misericordia, and the latter, for religious reasons, "have never performed abortions," this created a conflict with the mayor's "policy to provide abortion services for poor women in the communities where they live."

== See also ==
- List of hospitals in the Bronx
