= Prospect Hospital =

Defunct hospital in The Bronx/NYC, subsequently a nursing home

Geography
- Location: The Bronx, New York, United States
- Coordinates: 40.816606570616°N 73.89954078793602°W

Organization
- Type: General

Services
- Beds: 175

History
- Opened: 1963
- Closed: 1985

Links
- Lists: Hospitals in New York State
- Other links: List of hospitals in the Bronx

Prospect Hospital on Kelly Street was a small private hospital in existence prior to the 175-bed seven-story private hospital located in The Bronx that opened at 730 Kelly Street in 1963 and closed in 1985, and is now a homeless shelter.

== History ==
Prospect, which owned "15 brownstone buildings that are used for drug and alcohol rehabilitation and other social programs," was owned by a locally-born man, Dr. Jacob B. Freedman, who built it in 1963. The hospital was the linchpin of the now-landmarked South Bronx neighborhood, Longwood.

An attempt was made by a group of doctors to reopen, but it was not successful. The 175-bed seven-story facility was purchased to become "family inns" rather than being termed "homeless shelters" or "welfare hotels." The latter were described as "rooms that are often cramped and squalid." The building, located at 730 Kelly Street, was renamed Prospect Family Inn; one part of it is Prospect Family Nursery, a two-room "around the clock" setup "where parents in crisis can leave their children for up to 72 hours."

At another location, there was a predecessor medical facility "that traced its beginnings to 1919."
