= University Heights Hospital =

Defunct Bronx hospital

Geography
- Location: The Bronx, New York, United States
- Coordinates: 40.8509°N 73.9120°W

History
- Closed: Closed

Links
- Lists: Hospitals in New York State

University Heights Hospital was a proprietary hospital located in the 18th Electoral District (ED) of The Bronx. This private hospital served its local community for births and deaths but was more limited in-between.

They were included in a study of patient racial composition published in 1984. The hospital closed, and the site was repurposed as a store.
