= NYC Health + Hospitals =

Operator of public hospitals and clinics in New York City

Not-for-profit overview
- Formed: 1969; 57 years ago
- Jurisdiction: New York City
- Headquarters: 50 Water Street, New York, NY 10004
- Employees: ~ 45,000
- Not-for-profit executive: Dr. Mitchell H. Katz, President & CEO; José A. Pagán, Chair
- Key document: New York City Health And Hospitals Corporation Act
- Website: nychealthandhospitals.org

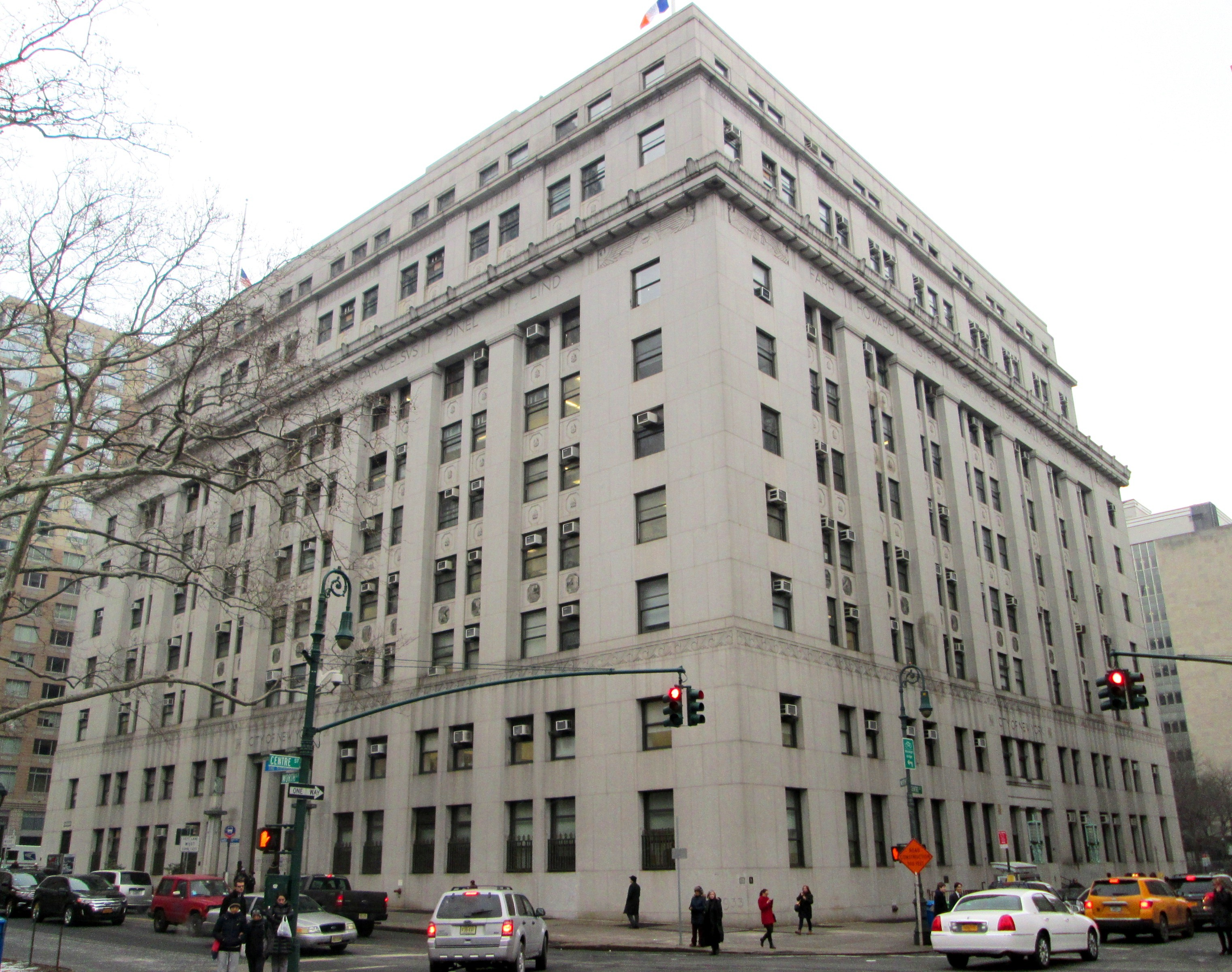
125 Worth Street, headquarters of HHC and of the New York City Department of Health and Mental Hygiene and the Department of Sanitation

NYC Health + Hospitals, officially the New York City Health and Hospitals Corporation (HHC), operates the public hospitals and clinics in New York City as a public benefit corporation. NYC Health + Hospitals is the largest municipal health system in the United States with about 45,000 employees. Its main mission is to ensure healthcare access through its network of safety net hospitals, long-term/rehabilitation centers and outpatient clinics.

HHC was created in 1969 by the New York State Legislature as a public benefit corporation. It is similar to a municipal agency, but has a board of directors.

== History ==
In 1736 HHC's oldest hospital, Bellevue Hospital, was founded as an infirmary for smallpox and other contagious diseases on the top floor of a public workhouse and jail. Bellevue Hospital was formally named in 1825. At the turn of the 20th century, Bellevue's medical college merged with University Medical College into what would later become the New York University College of Medicine.

In 1920, Bellevue founded the Children's Psychiatric Service, the first program in the United States devoted to the study of child autism and training child psychiatrists. Bellevue continues to provide through this day comprehensive pediatric services and renowned psychiatric services, as well as highly regarded emergency and trauma services. Bellevue remains the principal teaching hospital for its affiliated New York University School of Medicine. HHC's other hospitals were founded in the late 19th century and early-to-mid-20th century.

In 1965, Medicare and Medicaid were created and quickly accounted for 86 percent of the income received by the municipal hospital system. Patients with private insurance opted to use private hospitals and Medicaid raised its eligibility. As a consequence, New York City hospitals saw patient numbers and funding decline precipitously. According to a 1967 study just two years later, the conditions and quality of care at public hospitals in New York City were deplorable.

In 1969, New York State created HHC to replace the city's Department of Hospitals in operating city hospitals and other health care facilities. HHC was formed as a quasi public agency to enable it to benefit from private revenues and funding. HCC's fiscal condition nevertheless has varied periodically since its formation, and it has gone through periods of instability. In June 1970 it took over the city's public hospitals.

The most well known hospital in the HHC system is Bellevue Hospital – the oldest public hospital in the United States. Bellevue is the designated hospital for treatment of the President of the United States and other world leaders if they become ill or injured while in New York City.

The organization underwent a rebranding initiative in November 2015, shortening its name from 40 characters to 19 characters, as "NYC Health + Hospitals".

As of 2021, HHC is the largest municipal healthcare system in the United States with $10.9 billion in annual revenues, serving 1.4 million patients, including more than 475,000 uninsured city residents, providing services interpreted in more than 190 languages.

In 2022, HHC revised its food procurement policy to make plant-based meals the default option for patients, with animal source foods available only on request. As of 2023, a majority of meals served in HHC facilities were vegetarian, and food-related greenhouse gas emissions had fallen by 36% relative to before the program was implemented.

The organization is headquartered at 125 Worth Street in the Civic Center neighborhood of Manhattan.

== Facilities ==
NYC Health + Hospitals operates 11 hospitals across the city:

- Bellevue
- Elmhurst
- Harlem
- Jacobi
- Kings County
- Lincoln
- Metropolitan
- North Central Bronx
- Queens
- South Brooklyn
- Woodhull

HHC operates 5 long-term care centers:

- Carter
- Coler
- Gouverneur
- McKinney
- Sea View

The HHC network also includes 30 community-based clinics throughout the city under the Gotham Health name.

== Awards and grants ==
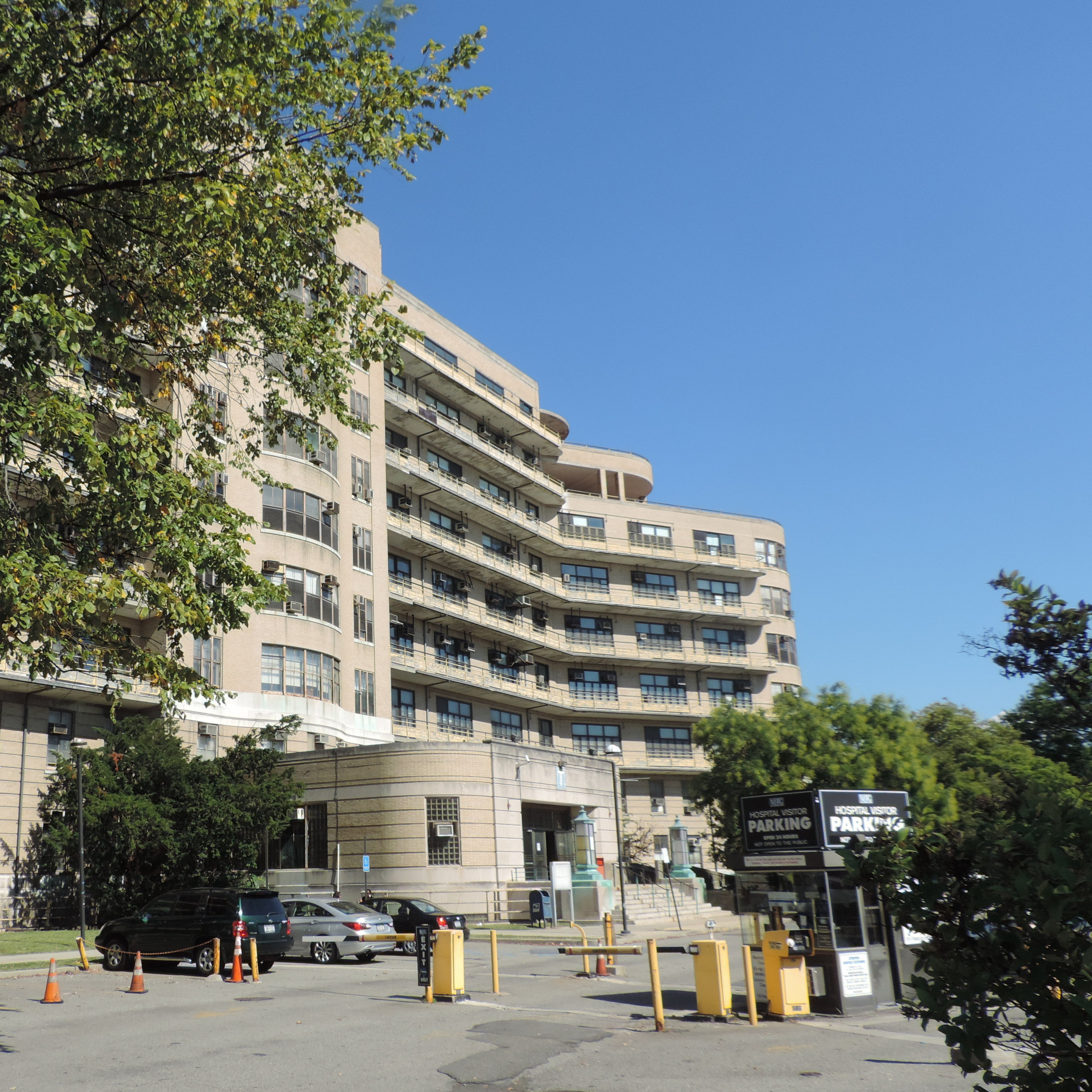
The former Triboro Tuberculosis Hospital at Queens Hospital Center

HHC has won a number of awards and grants in recent years for its quality of care and innovative community-based programs. In 2006, a study by the federal Centers for Medicare and Medicaid Services (CMS) ranked quality of care at HHC among the highest in New York City in the areas of heart attack, heart failure and pneumonia. HHC reported that of the 50 hospitals in New York City that voluntarily submitted quality data to CMS, HHC hospitals held seven of the top nine places – and all ranked in the top 17 – when judged by 10 specific measures of healthcare quality for the treatment of patients with life-threatening heart and pulmonary conditions, and that Brooklyn's Coney Island Hospital achieved a first-place ranking among all New York City hospitals, public or private.

On September 30, 2008, the Centers for Disease Control and Prevention (CDC) awarded HHC a $10 million grant to be administered by the National Institute for Occupational Safety and Health (NIOSH). The grant, which will provide up to $30 million over three years, is to provide health services to non-responder populations in New York City affected by the World Trade Center attack. Under the grant, HHC will provide medical examinations, diagnostic testing, referral and treatment for residents, students, and others in the community that were directly affected by the dust and debris from the collapse of the World Trade Center buildings on Sept. 11, 2001. Other recent grants to HHC include to expand access to neonatal care and to improve health literacy among low literacy patients.

=== Technology systems ===
In recent years, HHC has received recognition for its advanced clinical information system which includes a comprehensive electronic health record (also known as an electronic medical record). HHC public hospitals have won the Nicholas E. Davies award for the use of clinical information technology. HHC President Alan Aviles received the CEO IT Achievement Award from the Healthcare Information and Management Systems Society and Modern Healthcare Magazine for leading use of information technology to advance healthcare excellence. And HHC's North Bronx Healthcare Network was awarded Hospitals and Health Networks' Most Wired Award four consecutive years for its use of information technology in safety, quality, customer service, business processes and workforce training.

== Public safety ==
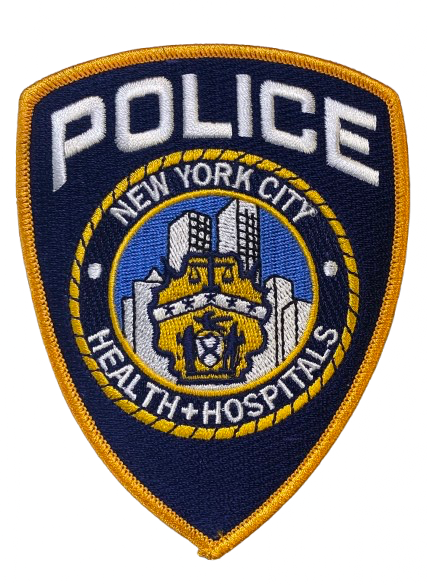
NYC H+H Police Patch

This agency employs Special Officers who provide on site safety and security services at 18 NYC Health and Hospital facilities. They have very limited peace officer officer authority in connection with their employment pursuant to New York State Criminal Procedure Law § 2.10 sub division 40, and Health + Hospitals Corporation policy. They are required to complete a New York State basic peace officer academy located at Jacobi Hospital. Health + Hospitals Special officers are prohibited by state law from carrying a firearm.

The New York City Police Department is the primary policing and investigation agency within New York City as per the NYC Charter, They respond to all incidents that occur at NYC Health and Hospitals facilities

== Controversies ==
=== Lawsuit and investigation ===
Conditions at the psychiatric unit of the Kings County Hospital Center in Brooklyn, one of 11 HHC hospitals, remain the subject of a lawsuit and scrutiny by the press. In May 2007, the New York State Mental Hygiene Legal Service, the New York Civil Liberties Union, and Kirkland & Ellis, a private law firm, filed a lawsuit against Kings County Hospital. The plaintiffs charged that its psychiatric unit was "a chamber of filth, decay, indifference and danger." The May 2007 lawsuit alleged that patients at the Kings County Hospital "are subjected to overcrowded and squalid conditions often accompanied by physical abuse and unnecessary and punitive injections of mind-altering drugs."

In December 2007, the U.S. Department of Justice and the U.S. Attorney's Office for the Eastern District of New York began a separate investigation.

In June 2008, the plaintiffs in the May 2007 lawsuit released a video of Esmin Green, a 49-year-old patient, dying on the floor of a waiting room in King County Hospital after waiting to be seen by at the psychiatric emergency department for more than 24 hours. Shortly after the release of the video, which was highly publicized, HHC officials agreed in court to implement emergency reforms. Alan Aviles, HHC president, released a statement that he was shocked and distressed by the situation and promised a thorough investigation. Six HHC employees were fired and reforms were implemented. The particular conditions at Kings County Hospital appear to be largely limited to that unit. As part of a broader transparency initiative, HHC voluntarily reported health and safety data for 2008, showing significant declines in infection and mortality rates across its participating hospitals on its website. Procedures across HHC hospitals and centers, however, are largely unstandardized and conditions vary widely.

On February 5, 2009, the plaintiffs in the May 2007 lawsuit issued a joint statement acknowledging that reforms had been implemented but stating that further reforms are needed. Plaintiffs stated:

[T]he hospital remains a dangerous place where patient health and safety is at risk on a daily basis. … Clearly, much more works needs to be done. The federal government's involvement brings a vast array of expertise and resources, and we look forward to working with the DOJ and the U.S. Attorney's Office in our efforts to make Kings County Hospital a safe, effective, and therapeutic environment in which New Yorkers can receive the professional care and treatment they deserve. It is our hope and expectation that the express willingness of the defendants to work with DOJ and Plaintiff's counsel will, in fact, result in the change that KCHC so desperately needs.

Bloomberg has stressed the need for, and improvements in, accountability and transparency at HHC, stating in March 2009, “New York City's public hospitals are also national leaders in reporting on patient safety, including the rate of infections acquired during hospital stays – a very troubling problem nationwide. Our taxpayers deserve to know that. That's what accountability is about – and we need to make accountability the norm throughout the country, in big cities and small towns."

=== 2009 state funding cut ===
In March 2009, HHC announced spending reductions of $105 million and said that it would eliminate 400 jobs because of Medicaid cuts, rising expenses and a growing number of uninsured patients. Alan Aviles, HHC President, said regarding the cuts, "We can try and ensure that patients who are adversely affected can be linked to alternative care. That, of course, will become more and more difficult as we have to dig deeper and deeper."

Local DC 37, a union representing some of HHC's 30,000 workers, announced:

If there is one thing that should be obvious in this economic climate it is that layoffs are not a solution but only compound the problems we're facing. District Council 37 will address this issue aggressively. We are talking to the State to make sure that the federal stimulus moneys are used for the purpose for which they are intended.

Cutbacks will include four school-based health programs, three community clinics, two mental health day treatment programs, and the consolidation of three other hospital-based programs. At the time of the March 2009 announcement, Aviles said these cuts address a fraction of the problem and pointed to additional reductions in the future.

In early April, Aviles circulated a letter to HHC's employees and its community advisory board stating that due to decisions by Governor Paterson the cuts would be significantly deeper than those reported in March. The effect of the initial and additional funding cutbacks on the ability of HHC to deliver effective community care is unclear. The process by which the cuts were decided upon by Governor Paterson has not yet been reported.

== See also ==
- New York City Department of Health and Mental Hygiene
- List of hospitals in New York City
- List of hospitals in New York
