= Kamenitz =

Kamenitz is a Yiddish and German name of the following places:

- Kamyenyets, Belarus
- Kamianets-Podilskyi, Ukraine
- Kamenice (Jihlava District), Czech Republic

== See also ==
- Kaminetz
- Kamenica (disambiguation)
