= North Central Bronx Hospital =

NYC Health + Hospitals/North Central Bronx
- NYC Health + Hospitals
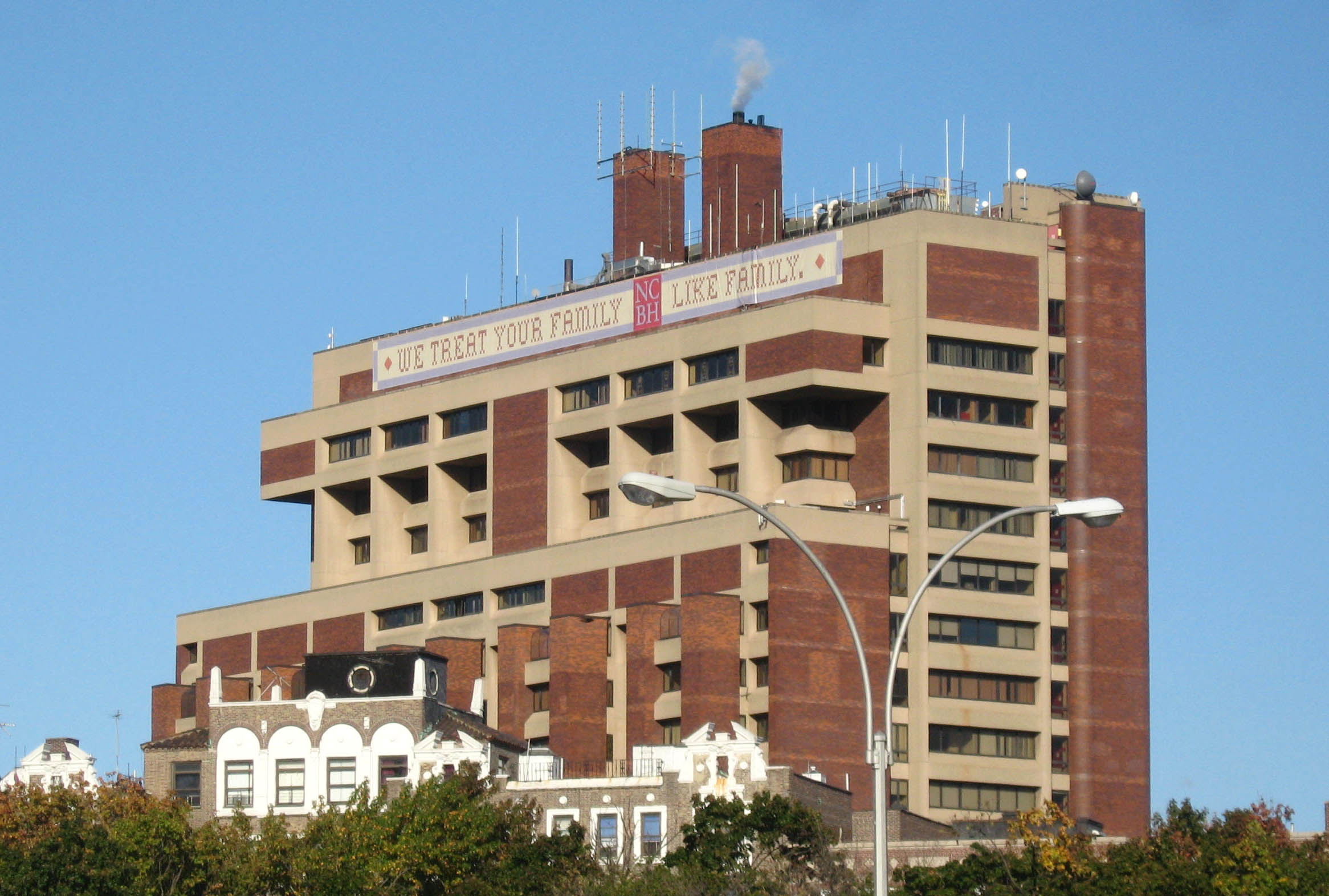

Geography
- Location: 3424 Kossuth Avenue, The Bronx, New York, United States
- Coordinates: 40°52′49.55″N 73°52′53.05″W

Organization
- Type: Teaching
- Affiliated university: James J. Peters VA Medical Center
- Network: North Bronx Health Network

Services
- Standards: Joint Commission
- Emergency department: Yes
- Beds: 213 permanent & 120 additional temporary beds
- Speciality: Community

History
- Former name: North Central Bronx Hospital
- Opened: 1976; 50 years ago

Links
- Website: www.nychealthandhospitals.org/northcentralbronx/
- Lists: Hospitals in New York State
- Other links: Hospitals in The Bronx

NYC Health + Hospitals/North Central Bronx, better known as North Central Bronx Hospital, is a municipal hospital founded in 1976 and operated by NYC Health + Hospitals. The 17 story Brutalist style building is located next to the Montefiore Medical Center in the Norwood neighborhood of The Bronx in New York City.

North Central Bronx Hospital is one of the 11 acute care hospitals of the NYC Health + Hospitals corporation. The hospital is a partner in the North Bronx Healthcare Network along with the Jacobi Medical Center.

The hospital has an educational affiliation with James J. Peters VA Medical Center.

== History ==
The $100 million Brutalist architecture facility opened on October 25, 1976. A $12.5 million a year contract with nearby Montefiore Medical Center to provide some medical services was in place at the time.

In 1977 the hospital began a birth center program that includes midwives. The birth center was renovated in 2013 and re-opened in 2014.

In 2020, the 215 bed hospital began a rapid expansion of 120 additional intensive care unit (ICU) beds to assist the hospital's response to the COVID-19 pandemic. The first 20 of the additional beds were opened as a COVID-19 specific ICU on May 5, 2020.

In 2024, North Central Bronx added an employee wellness room to promote emotional health for their staff.

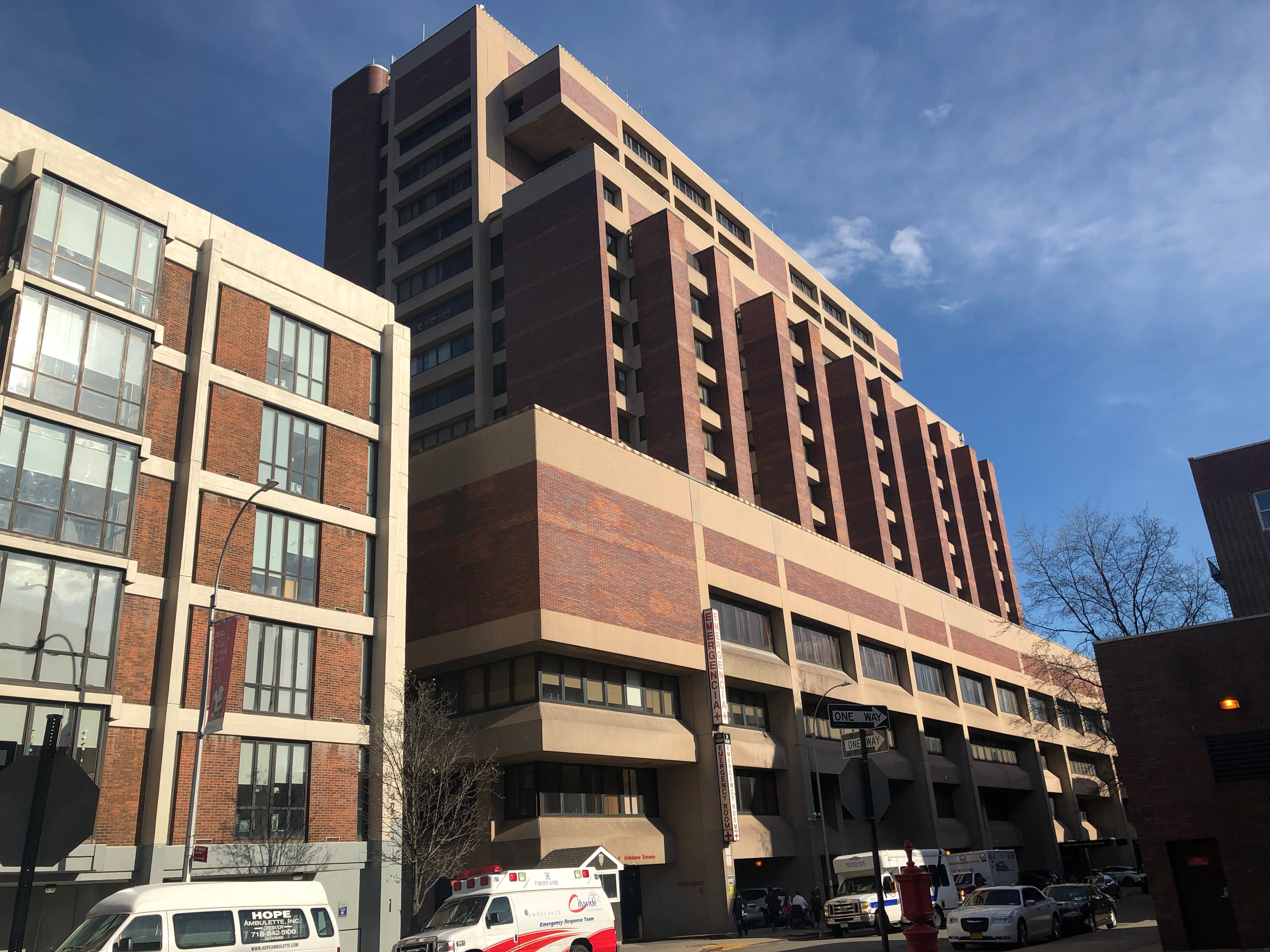
North Central Bronx Hospital

== See also ==
- NYC Health + Hospitals
- Montefiore Medical Center
- List of hospitals in the Bronx
