= Bronx Maternity Hospital =

Defunct Bronx hospital

Geography
- Location: The Bronx, New York, United States
- Coordinates: 40.8319°N 73.9192°W

History
- Opened: 1920
- Closed: after 1951

Links
- Lists: Hospitals in New York State

Bronx Maternity Hospital was a growing medical facility which was heralded "POOR TO BE TREATED FREE: Forty Beds to be Devoted Exclusively to Mothers and Ailing Children" in 1920 when they outgrew their prior location.

== History ==
From a 1914 MATERNITY HOSPITAL FAIR to a 1920 dedication "attended by a thousand or more men and women" they grew. In 1930 The New York Times headlined "Maternity Institution Plans a $1,000,000 Structure"

Twenty-one years later a "Building Plans Filed" headline followed. The hospital has since closed.
