= Crotona Park Hospital =

Defunct hospital in The Bronx/NYC, now a Detox/Drug rehab

Crotona Park Hospital was a hospital in The Bronx. Today that location houses a "substance abuse treatment rehabilitation center." The building was designed by Louis Abramson.

The hospital's name comes from its location, "southeast corner of Crotona Park East and Charlotte Street" rather than "Crotona Avenue and Crotona Park South" to which location Fordham Hospital moved in 1907.
