= Avraham Eliezer Alperstein =

Belarusian-born American Orthodox rabbi and Talmudic scholar

- Rabbi Avraham Eliezer Alperstein
- Born: c. 1853; Kobrin, Grodno Province, Belarus
- Died: January 28, 1917 (aged 64); New York City, United States
- Occupation: Orthodox Rabbi

Avraham Eliezer Alperstein (c. 1853 – January 28, 1917) was an Orthodox Rabbi, Rosh Yeshiva, publisher, communal leader and exceptional Talmudic scholar. He published the first ever section of Talmud in the United States.

== Education ==
Studying under the Ridbaz and the Beis HaLevi in his youth and then in Vilna and Kovno, Rabbi Alperstein obtained an extraordinary knowledge of both the Talmud Bavli and the Talmud Yerushalmi. He received Semicha from Rabbi Mordechai Meltzer (Rabbi of Lida), and Rabbi Aryeh Leib Shachnovitz (Rabbi of Bielsk).

Upon gaining semicha, Rabbi Alperstein briefly served as rabbi of the Kamenitzer Shul in Vilna before becoming Rabbi of nearby Novhorod-Siverskyi. A few years later he accepted a position as Rabbi of the Zevach Tzedek shul in the vibrant Jewish community of Slabodka.

Rabbi Alperstein immigrated to the United States in 1881, becoming Rabbi of Khal Adath Jeshurun in New York. In 1884, he went to Chicago to take another rabbinic pulpit, serving there for 15 years as Rabbi of various shuls including Congregation Oheb Shalom Bnai Marienpol, Anshei Kovno, and the Suvalker Shul. While in the city, he published his commentary to Tractate Bikkurim of the Jerusalem Talmud. The work boasted two notable approbations, one from the Beis HaLevi of Brisk and the other from Rabbi Jacob Joseph of New York. Moving in 1899 to St. Paul, Rabbi Alperstein returned to New York in 1901 to become Rabbi of the Yagustava shul on Rutgers Street.

== RIETS ==
Alperstein in 1909

Upon his return to New York, Rabbi Alperstein was delighted to learn that his colleagues Rabbis Moshe Matlin and Yehuda David Bernstein had opened a Lithuanian-style yeshiva named in honour of the distinguished Rabbi Yitzchak Elchanan Spektor of Kovno. Desiring to assist the yeshiva, Rabbi Alperstein's abilities as a dynamic public speaker in Yiddish proved useful as he campaigned throughout the Shteiblach of the Lower East Side for funds for RIETS.

In 1903, when RIETS felt it had outgrown its premises at the Kalvarier shul, Rabbi Alperstein arranged for the yeshiva to transfer to his own Yagustava shul. By 1905, the year he became Rabbi at Congregation Mishkon Yisroel, approximately 100 students were engaged in Torah study in RIETS, under the tutelage of several rabbis including Rabbi Alperstein.

Rabbi Alperstein is widely recognized as the first Rosh Yeshiva of the Rabbi Isaac Elchanan Theological Seminary (RIETS), which became a part of Yeshiva University. Multiple sources confirm that he held this distinction, helping to establish the institution's educational and spiritual foundations.

Rabbi Alperstein was highly active in the areas of Kashrut and Jewish education. He was one of the founders of the Agudath Harabbonim, serving as its vice-president and directing the New York branch. He died on January 28, 1917, and was buried in Mount Judah Cemetery, New York. His wife, Bertha, founded the 'Beth Abraham Home for the Incurably Sick' in the Bronx in his memory, which today is the Beth Abraham Hospital, part of the Montefiore Medical Center.

== Writings ==
- Sefer HaRaal uPri Genusar (Chicago, 1888) - a triple commentary on Maseches Bikkurim of the Talmud Yerushalmi, the first ever section of Talmud published in America
- unpublished responsa, as well as writings on Tractate Berachot of the Jerusalem Talmud and Tractate Niddah of the Babylonian Talmud
- several Torah articles in the Jerusalem rabbinic journal Ha-Measef
