= Beth Abraham Center =

Nursing home in the Bronx, New York City

- Centers Healthcare

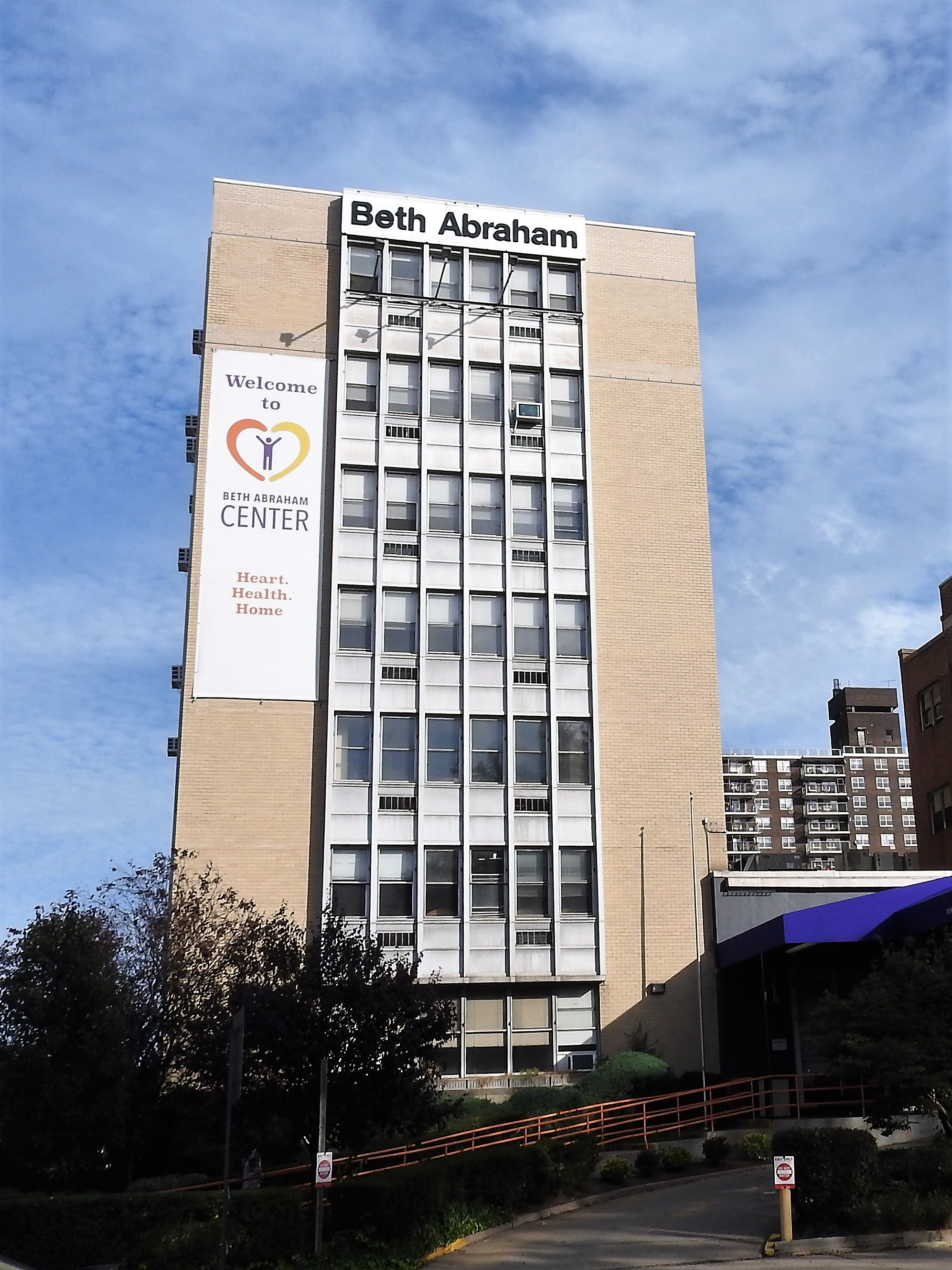
- The facility as seen from across Bronx Park East.

Geography
- Location: 612 Allerton Ave, Bronx, New York, United States
- Coordinates: 40.8649°N 73.8700°W

Organization
- Care system: Private
- Type: Specialist
- Network: Centers Healthcare

Services
- Beds: 450
- Speciality: Rehabilitation, residential care

History
- Former names: Beth Abraham Hospital; Beth Abraham Home; Beth Abraham Home for Incurables
- Opened: March 21, 1920; 106 years ago

Links
- Website: beth-abraham-center.facilities.centershealthcare.org
- Lists: Hospitals in New York State

Beth Abraham Center for Rehabilitation and Nursing is a medical facility in Bronx, New York, which was founded as the Beth Abraham Home for Incurables. It was originally a long-term residential care facility, but was later expanded to include rehabilitation services.

== History ==
Bertha Alperstein founded Beth Abraham in memory of her late husband Avraham Eliezer Alperstein. The property was acquired in January 1920 for $115,000 (equivalent to $1,848,214 in 2025), and the new hospital opened on March 21, 1920. On its fifth anniversary, the hospital celebrated the opening of a new building costing $500,000 (equivalent to $8,035,714 in 2025) which increased its total capacity to 225 patients.

In January 1952, the hospital's name was shortened to Beth Abraham Home, owing to developments in "rehabilitative physical and psychological techniques [which gave] patients a chance to advance medically and socially far beyond former concepts of mere custodial care."

In 1963, Beth Abraham began "an active affiliation with a neighboring teaching institution, Montefiore Hospital".

In 1996, The New York Times wrote that "the 520-bed Bronx hospital" was opening new facilities in Westchester County and in Manhattan. Although they also use the name Beth Abraham - Centers Health Care Nursing and Rehabilitation, as of 2021 Montefiore's "Find a Doctor" still lists "Beth Abraham Hospital. 612 Allerton Avenue. Bronx, NY."
