= Jacobi Medical Center =

- NYC Health + Hospitals

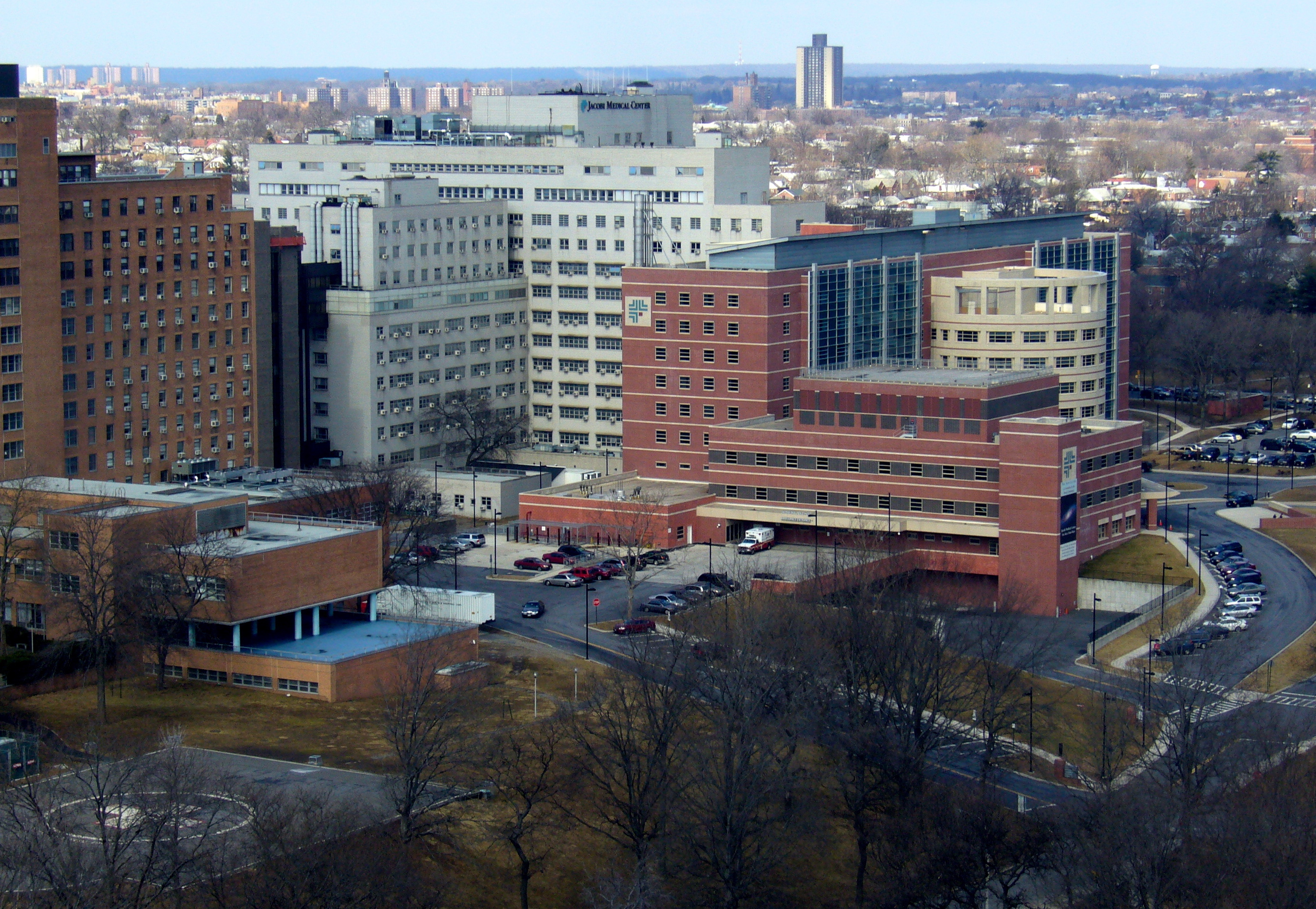
- Aerial view of the hospital

Geography
- Location: 1400 Pelham Parkway South, Bronx, New York, United States
- Coordinates: 40.8560°N 73.8463°W

Organization
- Type: Teaching
- Affiliated university: Albert Einstein College of Medicine
- Network: NYC Health + Hospitals

Services
- Emergency department: Level I Adult Trauma Center / Level II Pediatric Trauma Center
- Beds: 457

Helipads
- Helipad: Yes

History
- Former names: Bronx Municipal Hospital Center; Jacobi Hospital; Van Etten Hospital
- Founded: 1955

Links
- Website: www.nychealthandhospitals.org/jacobi
- Lists: Hospitals in New York State
- Other links: Hospitals in The Bronx

Jacobi Medical Center (NYC Health + Hospitals/Jacobi) is a municipal hospital operated by NYC Health + Hospitals in affiliation with the Albert Einstein College of Medicine. The facility is located in the Morris Park neighborhood of the Bronx, New York City. It is named in honor of German physician Abraham Jacobi, who is regarded as the father of American pediatrics.

Founded in 1955 as Bronx Municipal Hospital Center, the hospital opened concurrent with the opening of the Albert Einstein College of Medicine. This was the first time a medical school and municipal hospital entered into a formal affiliation agreement at the same time they were both built—and their relationship continues to this day. Jacobi is a primary clerkship site for 3rd- and 4th-year medical students from the Albert Einstein College of Medicine. Jacobi offers residency training programs in Internal Medicine, Pediatrics and Radiology. It also offers many joint residency programs with Montefiore Medical Center.

Jacobi provides health care for some 1.2 million Bronx and New York City area residents. It is one of the 11 acute care hospitals of NYC Health + Hospitals and a partner in the North Bronx Healthcare Network with the North Central Bronx Hospital. As one of the largest medical facilities of NYC, Jacobi houses the Bronx's only burn unit and Level I trauma center. The hospital also houses a Level III neonatal intensive care unit and FDNY EMS Station 20 (formerly NYC*EMS Station 23). Jacobi had over 320,000 clinical visits and over 100,000 emergency department visits in 2016. Jacobi also houses one of only two Snakebite Treatment Centers in the tri-state area.

== History ==
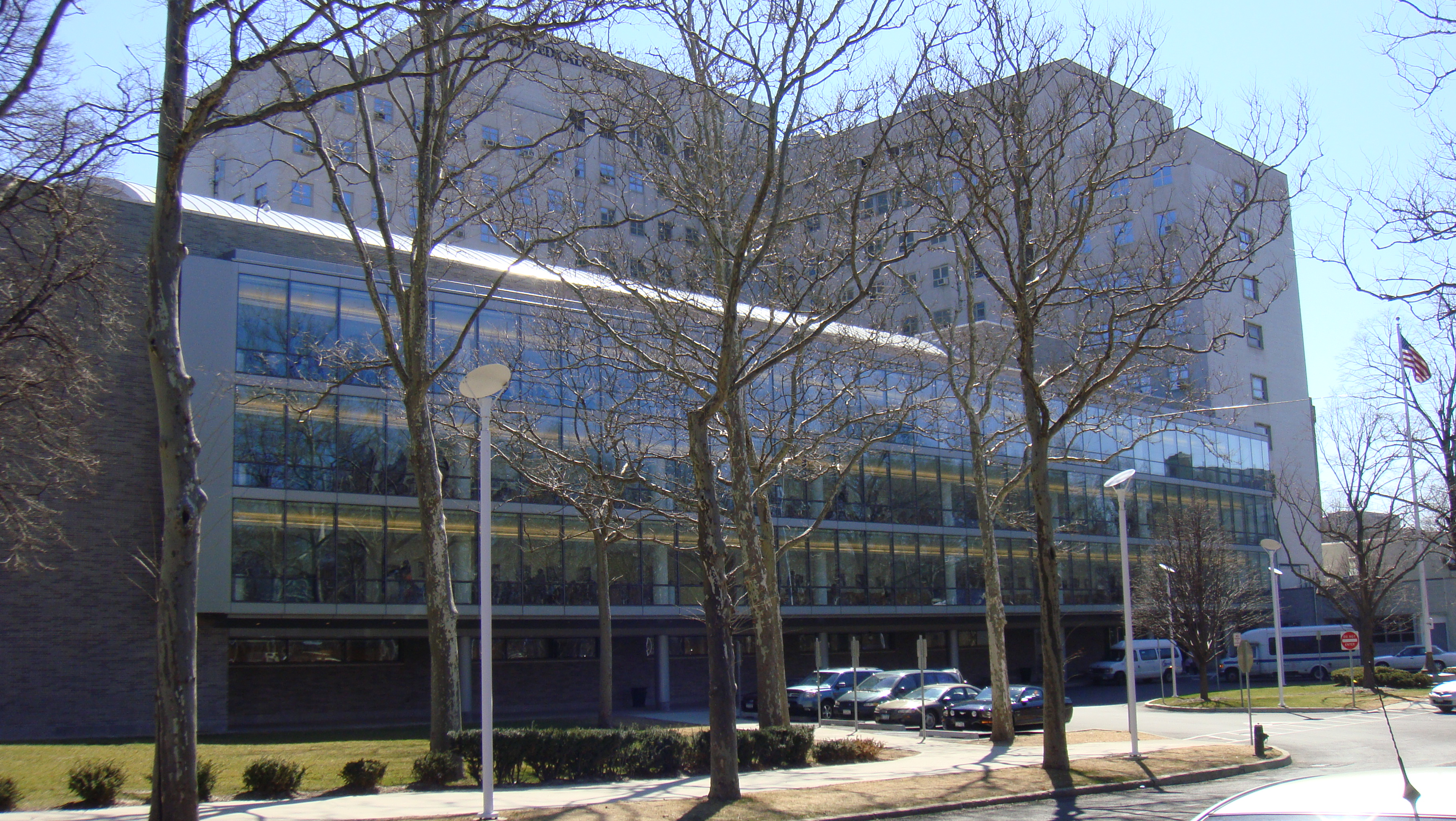
Jacobi Ambulatory Building

At the turn of the century, the area where Jacobi Medical Center would ultimately be established was known for the Morris Park Racecourse built by millionaire John A. Morris in 1889.

In the early 20th century however, a fire destroyed the grandstand, and the racetrack closed. Much of the land was divided up and sold for residential development. In 1949, a 64-acre (260,000 m^{2}) parcel was purchased by the New York City Department of Hospitals to establish a tertiary care facility and teaching hospital with a campus-like health care environment – one which would be located well away from urban congestion, traffic noise and fumes. This campus of healthcare services was originally called the Bronx Municipal Hospital Center, providing acute care at Jacobi Hospital as well as adjacent tuberculosis care at Van Etten Hospital (which is currently Building 5 of the Albert Einstein College of Medicine Block Research Pavilion).

Although built on a spread-out campus, the site selection for Jacobi was also the function of the tensions of the Cold War. With its easy access to highways, railways, navigable waterways and airports, Jacobi was built on a site ideally suited for use as a large war-time evacuation center, and its placement in an outer borough with plans calling for the creation of vast sub-basements were deliberate measures to avoid fallout from a possible nuclear attack.

Following several years of construction, Van Etten Hospital opened in September 1954 with 500 beds, named in honor of Dr. Nathan B. Van Etten, a well-known Bronx practitioner with deep concern for the sick poor. About one year later on November 1, 1955, Jacobi Hospital, opened its doors for pediatric and infant care, with 898 beds.

Although coincidental, Yeshiva University had at this same time secured a charter with the New York State Board of Regents to establish a new medical school. When it came time for site selection, university advisers recommended establishment of the school adjacent to and affiliated with the new municipal hospital in the Bronx, construction of which was by then well underway. Hospital representatives similarly found the arrangement an attractive one. As a result, an affiliation agreement was created between the new Albert Einstein College of Medicine and the hospital campus, a mutually beneficial teaching, research, and patient care relationship which continues to this day.

From early on, Jacobi's medical accomplishments and innovations in patient care were many. In the 1950s, it was the first municipal hospital which provided an emergency department staffed with pediatric house officers as well as medical house officers. Van Etten, its chronic care affiliate, established several new protocols for the treatment of tuberculosis patients, most notably the eventual elimination of the face masks which had heightened patients' fear and isolation, and the establishment of the first Home Care Program for tuberculosis in NYC. Jacobi's clinicians in pediatrics made significant contributions in diagnosis and treatment of congenital heart disease in children, identified congenital abnormalities which caused renal tubular acidosis in children, and were the first to describe a seriously prolonged jaundice in infants. Jacobi psychiatrists were the first to create a psychiatric day hospital in a municipal facility, allowing patients to receive treatment during the day while living at home.

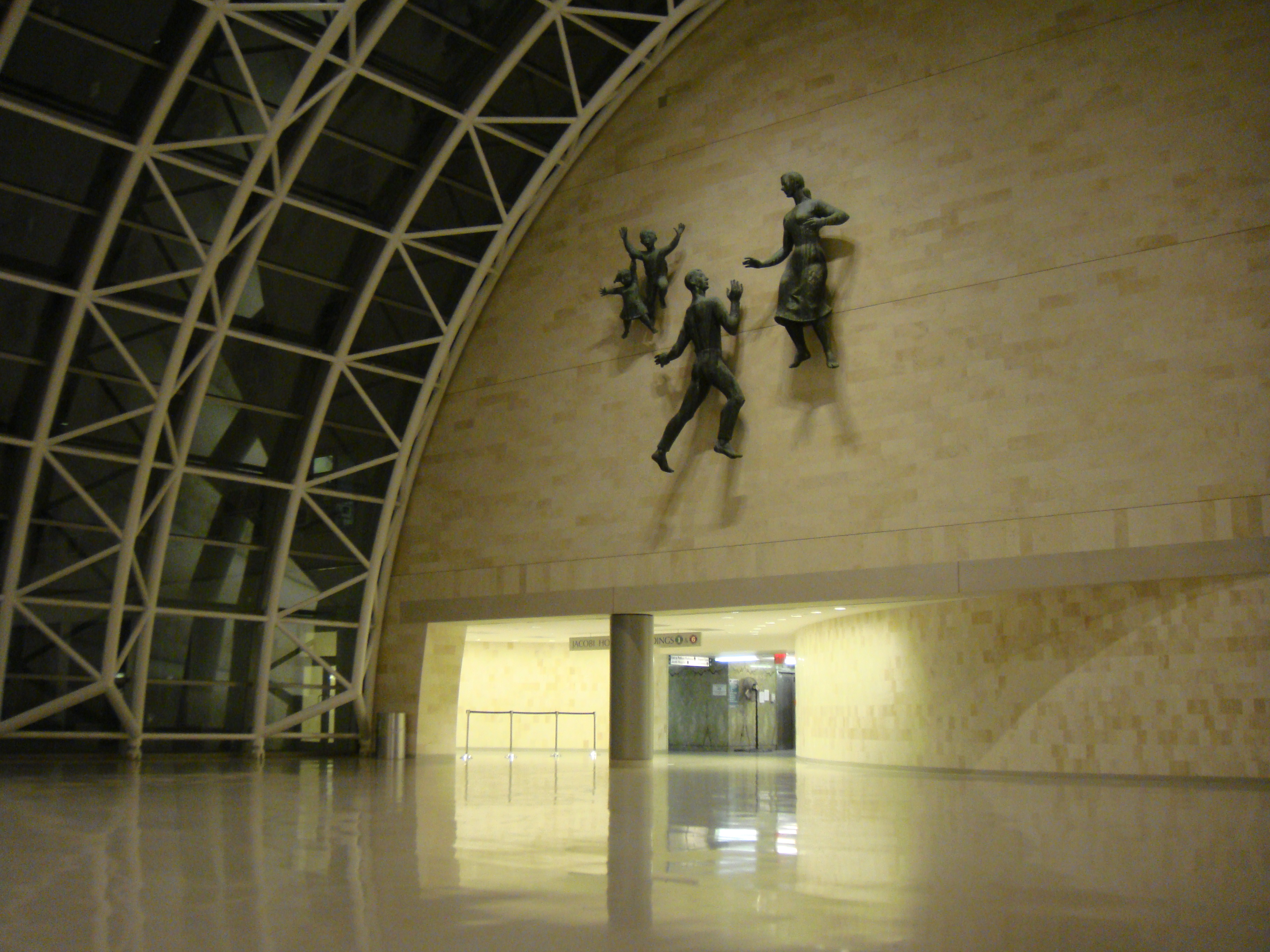
Jacobi Ambulatory Building 8 – Atrium

In the 1960s, surgeons at Jacobi performed the world's first successful clinical coronary artery bypass surgery; on May 2, 1960, Robert H. Goetz performed a right internal thoracic artery-to-right coronary artery anastomosis using a tantalum ring in a 38-year-old man. Cardiac catheterization on postoperative day 14 showed a patent stented anastomosis. The patient was anticoagulated with warfarin and remained free of angina for a year. He died at Jacobi on June 23, 1961, of a posterior wall myocardial infarction. Autopsy was not performed, and the long-term patency of the anastomosis was not established. They established the first NIH Clinical Research Center for the care and study of critically injured patients in the country. The center's work with severely burned patients led it to develop a new, highly effective method of hyperalimentation which was quickly adapted in burn protocols worldwide. Its research also prompted the use of germ-free isolators in the operating room and at the bedside to prevent infection. Using this brand new technology, Jacobi obstetricians delivered the first “germ-free” baby in the world. The center also studied and successfully treated patients with serious metabolic and genetic disorders, such as atherosclerosis and Wilson's Disease. Jacobi anesthesiologists developed the Gertie Marx Spinal Needle, named after Gertie F. Marx, a standard still used today for administration of the epidural block during labor. Jacobi neurologists isolated chemical markers which made it possible to identify carriers of Tay–Sachs disease, a deadly genetic disorder.

Over the course of the next few decades, Jacobi continued to make significant contributions, particularly in the areas of emergency medicine, trauma surgery, burn care, and AIDS research and treatment. It was at Jacobi that the first clinical application of the use of the CO_{2} laser in burn patient care was made. Jacobi's Burn Unit was one of the first to use advanced burn care products such as artificial skin. Jacobi founded the first Emergency Medicine (EM) residency in New York City, a program which is also one of the oldest and most respected EM training programs in the country. Jacobi's Emergency Department (ED) was one of the first in NYC with a full-body CAT scanner. Jacobi was the first hospital in NYC to offer a paramedic training program. Jacobi surgeons were the first to use mechanical staples in the U.S., and the first to use mini-computers to monitor blood circulation and lung function. Its work in AIDS care and research led Jacobi to the establishment of the first hospital-based pediatric AIDS Day Care Program in the United States.

In winter 2005, Jacobi opened a new 344-bed tertiary care facility. A new ambulatory care center designed by architect Ian Bader opened in summer 2008.

In March 2023, Jacobi Medical Center started using a surgical robot in the operating room. By August 2023, the robot had been used in over 150 surgeries.

== Jacobi Hyperbaric Medicine Services ==
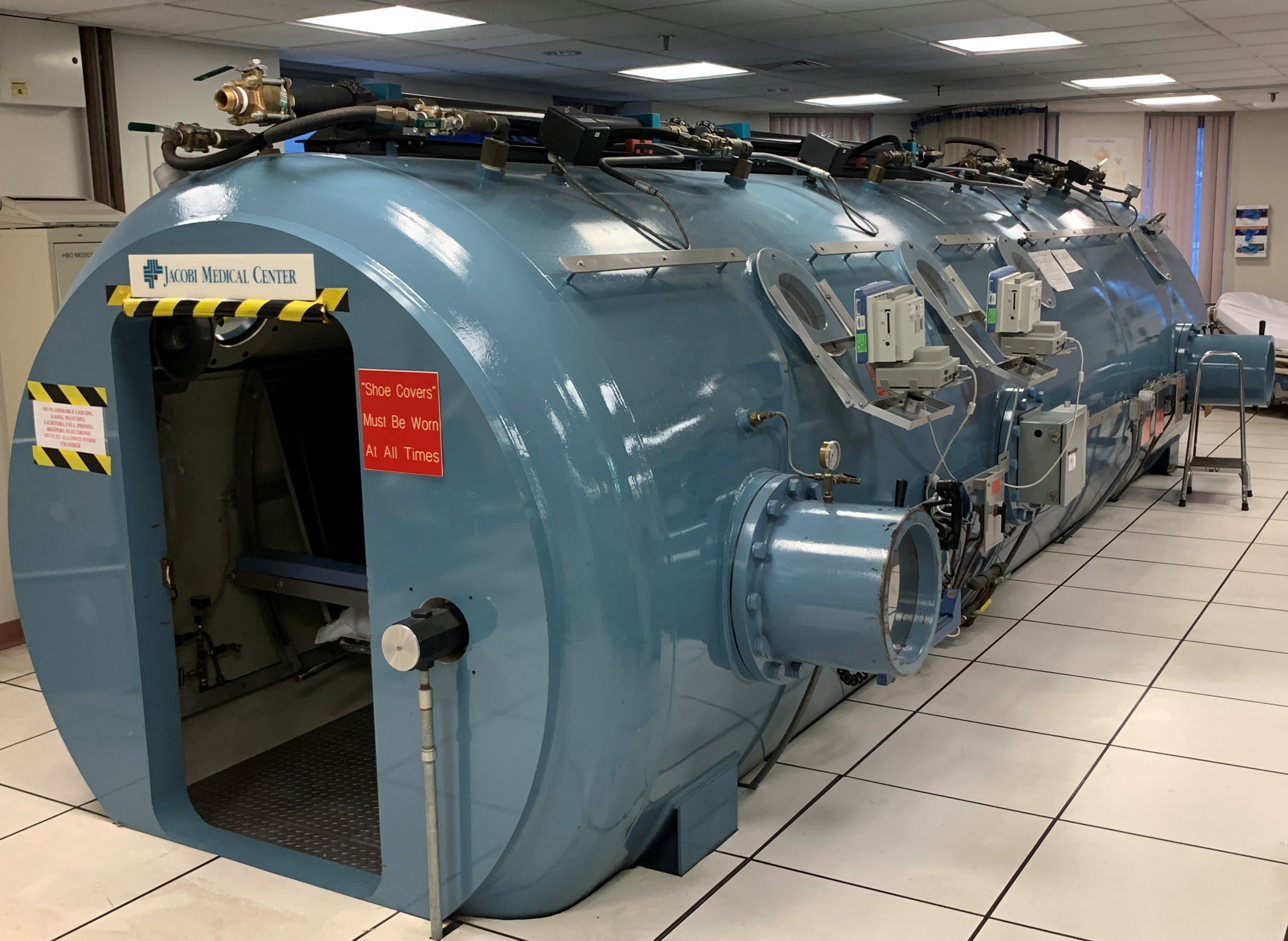
Jacobi hyperbaric chamber

The Jacobi Hyperbaric Medicine Service provides care for both inpatient and ambulatory patients in a large facility featuring a spacious, 23-foot long chamber. This room-like chamber is one which patients and medical support staff can actually walk into. It can comfortably accommodate up to nine patients at a time. Operating around the clock, the Hyperbaric Medicine Service provides life-saving care for burn patients and smoke inhalation injuries. In addition, Jacobi is the designated New York City Referral Center for the Diver's Alert Network, providing emergency care for decompression sickness. It also treats patients with gas gangrene and acute air embolism, and is widely used on an elective basis to promote wound healing from radiation injuries, compromised skin grafts, diabetic ulcers, and osteomyelitis. NYC Health + Hospitals/Jacobi was awarded $10M in Fiscal Year 2023 capital funding through Council Member Marjorie Velázquez and New York City Council Speaker Adrienne Adams to replace the hospital's hyperbaric chamber and expand Hyperbaric Medicine services. The allocated $10M will provide a new hyperbaric chamber that will be larger, measuring about 25.5 feet long and 8 feet in diameter, allowing the hospital to accommodate more patients. The current chamber can treat nine patients plus two staff members. However, the replacement will be able to treat 13 patients plus two staff members.

In October 2023, Jacobi Medical Center opened a newly renovated mental health clinic. The renovation cost $8 million and allows for more patients to be seen.

== January 25, 2022 shooting ==
On January 25, 2022, at approximately 12:30 p.m., an armed man entered the hospital's emergency waiting room, reporting asthma issues. Allegedly, after 35-year old Reuben Perez looked at him, the gunman responded “what the fuck are you looking at?”; he then pulled out his gun and shot Perez four times in the arm. The gunman fled the scene, and the hospital went on lockdown as police responded. Some time later, the gunman's sister called the police and reported that he was hearing voices, had a gun and was acting erratically. This, in part, helped the police arrest a man named Keber Martinez for the shooting shortly before midnight the same day. Martinez had signed in to the hospital with his own name.
