= Dumpson =

Dumpson is a surname. Notable people with the surname include:

- Goldie Brangman-Dumpson (1920–2020), American nurse and educator
- James R. Dumpson (1909–2012), American activist and social worker
- Taylor Dumpson, American activist
- William Dumpson (1930–2014), American baseball and basketball player
