= Mary Dee =

American radio personality (1912–1964)

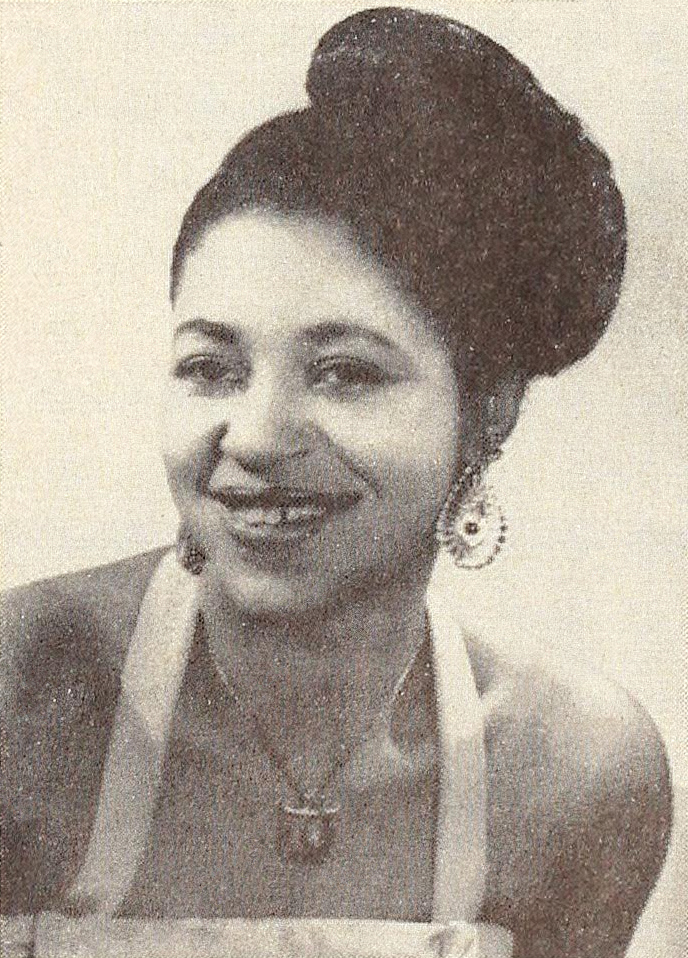
- Dee in 1951
- Born: Mary Elizabeth Goode; April 8, 1912; Homestead, Pennsylvania, U.S.
- Died: March 17, 1964 (aged 51); Philadelphia, Pennsylvania, U.S.
- Other names: Mary Dudley; Mary Dee Dudley; Mary Goode Dudley
- Education: Howard University
- Occupations: Radio personality; activist
- Years active: 1948–1964
- Spouse: Franklin C. Dudley (divorced)
- Children: 4

Mary Dudley (born Mary Elizabeth Goode; April 8, 1912 – March 17, 1964), known as Mary Dee, was an American disc jockey who is widely considered the first African-American woman disc jockey in the United States. She grew up in Homestead, Pennsylvania, and then studied at Howard University for two years. After having her family, she attended Si Mann School of Radio in Pittsburgh, and on August 1, 1948, went on the air at WHOD radio. Gaining national attention, Dee broadcast from a storefront, "Studio Dee", in the Hill District of Pittsburgh from 1951 to 1956. She moved her show, Movin' Around with Mary Dee, to Baltimore and broadcast from station WSID from 1956 to 1958. In 1958, she moved to Philadelphia and hosted Songs of Faith on WHAT until her death in 1964.

Dee is considered a pioneer in developing the radio format that combines coverage of community affairs with music and news. She was one of the first two black women admitted to the Association of American Women in Radio and Television, and was successful in campaigning for the organization to forgo meetings in segregated facilities. During her lifetime she received numerous awards for her civic work. In 2011 she was honored posthumously with the Thomas J. MacWilliams Lifetime Achievement Award from the Media Association of Pittsburgh.

== Early life and education ==
Mary Elizabeth Goode was born on April 8, 1912, in Homestead, Pennsylvania, to Mary Elizabeth (née Hunter) and William H. Goode. Both of her parents were the children of slaves and from Virginia. After their marriage in 1904, the couple migrated to Pittsburgh, where William worked for U.S. Steel. Among their children were James, who operated the Goode Real Estate Company, one of the first real estate firms operated by a black man in Pittsburgh; William, who owned Goode Pharmacy, a 24-hour pharmacy; Mal, first black network television correspondent, who worked for ABC News; Ruth, who worked in her brother's drug store and later ran a day-care center in McKeesport; and Allan, who worked at the Wylie Avenue News Agency and was an Army veteran.

Education was important to the family and five of the six children attended university. Goode grew up in Homestead and graduated from Homestead High School, before attending Howard University for two years. In the mid-1930s, she married Franklin C. Dudley, a steel worker, with whom she had four children; Yvonne, twins Sherwood and Sherlynn, and Franklin C. Jr.; but the couple later divorced. In 1947, Dudley enrolled at the Si Mann School of Radio in Pittsburgh, graduating with honors.

== Career ==
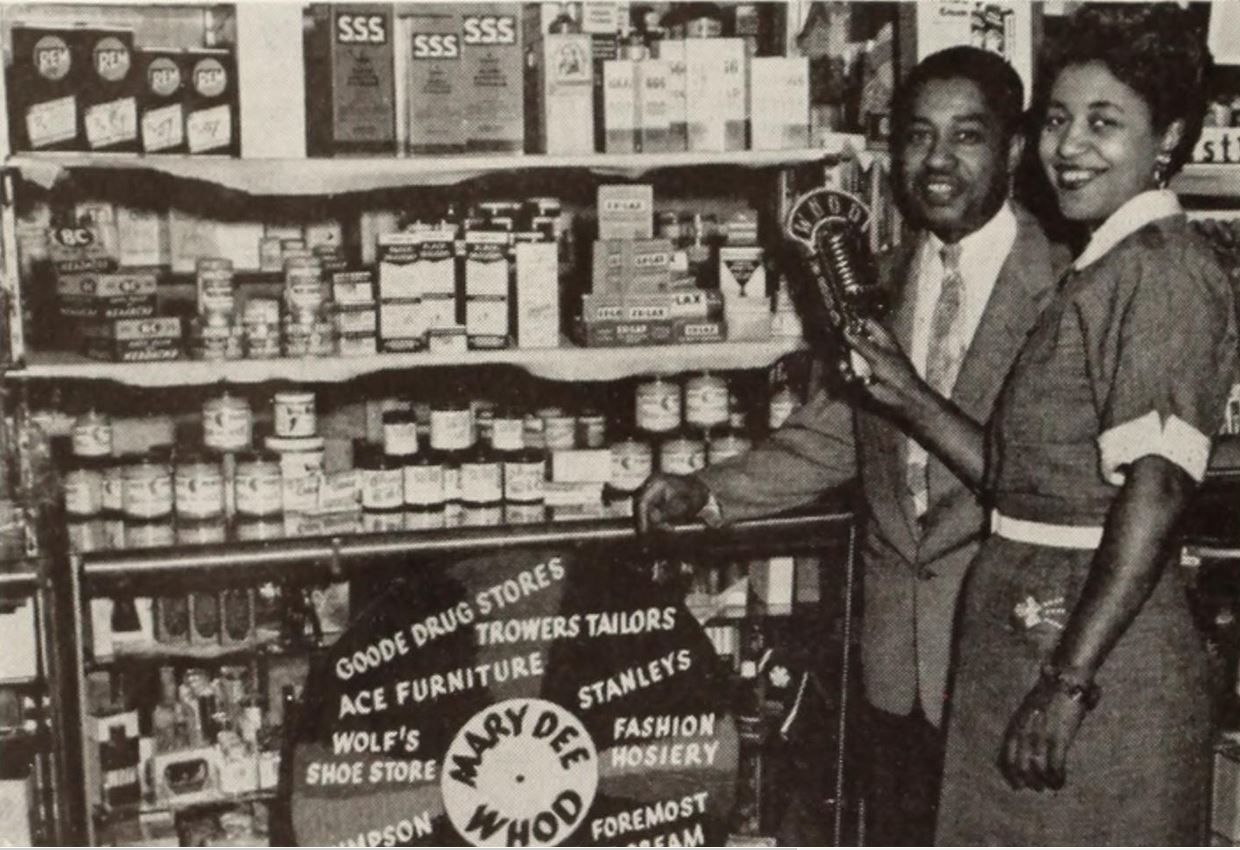
William Goode and Mary Dee, 1954 publicity photo

In 1948, when WHOD was founded in Homestead, Dudley applied for a job, but was not hired. She approached the station manager, who told her he would hire her on a trial basis if she could secure a sponsor. (Note: Sources vary on who sponsored her. Some sources state the first sponsor was Rufus Jackson, owner of Homestead's Manhattan Music Company; other sources show a group of sponsors, including a florist and her brothers James and William were the first sponsors; while still others report she was initially sponsored by a group of six business people.) Able to get backing, Dudley went on the air as Mary Dee on August 1, 1948. Her first broadcast was devoted to announcing a calendar of events for black women in the area. Within days, her time slot was extended to a 15-minute segment called Movin' Around with Mary Dee and then to 30 minutes. The following spring, it was increased to an hour-long show. By her first anniversary, the slot had extended to an hour and a half, to two hours on her second anniversary, and to four hours by her fourth year in the business. Despite the modest reception range, at 250 watts during the day, Dee garnered a large following, receiving more than 150 fan letters per day. Her fans crossed color lines, particularly with regard to her gospel music segment. She received mail from blacks as well as whites, and had both black and white sponsors.

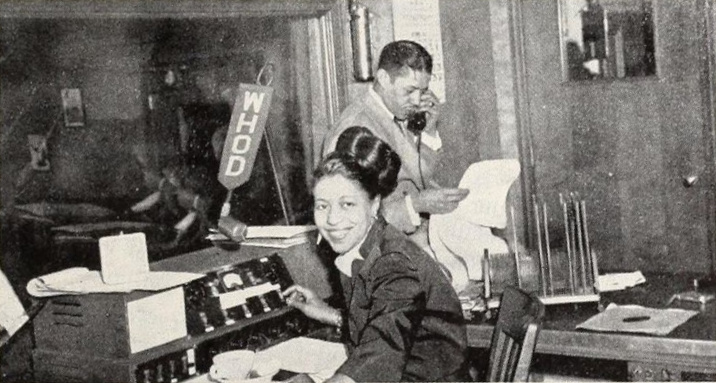
Dee and her brother Mal in her studio at WHOD in 1952

Dee pioneered a radio format that combined coverage of community affairs with music and news. She brought in her brother Mal, at the time a reporter of the Pittsburgh Courier, to do a segment on the news covering police beatings, poor housing, segregation issues, and other legal barriers to blacks. She later brought in Hazel Garland and Toki Schalk Johnson to cover women's items and had a segment featuring teenagers. Her music section gave air time to new releases by African-American artists, as well as local talent. In an interview segment, Dee talked to a wide variety of well-known figures including Tony Bennett, Joyce Bryant, Savannah Churchill, Nat King Cole, Eartha Kitt, Nellie Lutcher, Michael Musmanno, Johnnie Ray, and Sarah Vaughan. Ending her show was a gospel section, "Gospel Train", featuring music by Mahalia Jackson and other religious singers, which listeners could request.

After she was recognized by Ebony magazine in their September 1950 issue, Dee gained national attention and her own studio. In August 1951, "Studio Dee" was set up by WHOD in the Hill District of Pittsburgh at the corner of Herron and Center Avenues. The Hill District was the epicenter of cultural venues in Pittsburgh, featuring a diverse arts environment. In its heyday (1920–1960) the area was often called Little Harlem or the "Crossroads to the World", to reflect the wide range of cultural expressions found there. Music was integral to the growth of the arts and Dee was part of the scene. Dee took requests from fans who could watch her broadcasting from a storefront window. The studio moved into the Pittsburgh Courier building around 1954. WHOD was sold in 1955 and the programming changed to a country and western format by the new owners, who renamed the station WAMO in 1956.

Finding herself without a job, Dee moved her children to Baltimore, and began broadcasting Movin' Around with Mary Dee on WSID. In 1958, Dee was offered a show at WHAT radio in Philadelphia. She aired a program called Songs of Faith, featuring gospel music, for the next six years, gaining wide popularity. She also hosted live gospel music shows and lived in the Strawberry Mansion neighborhood of North Philadelphia.

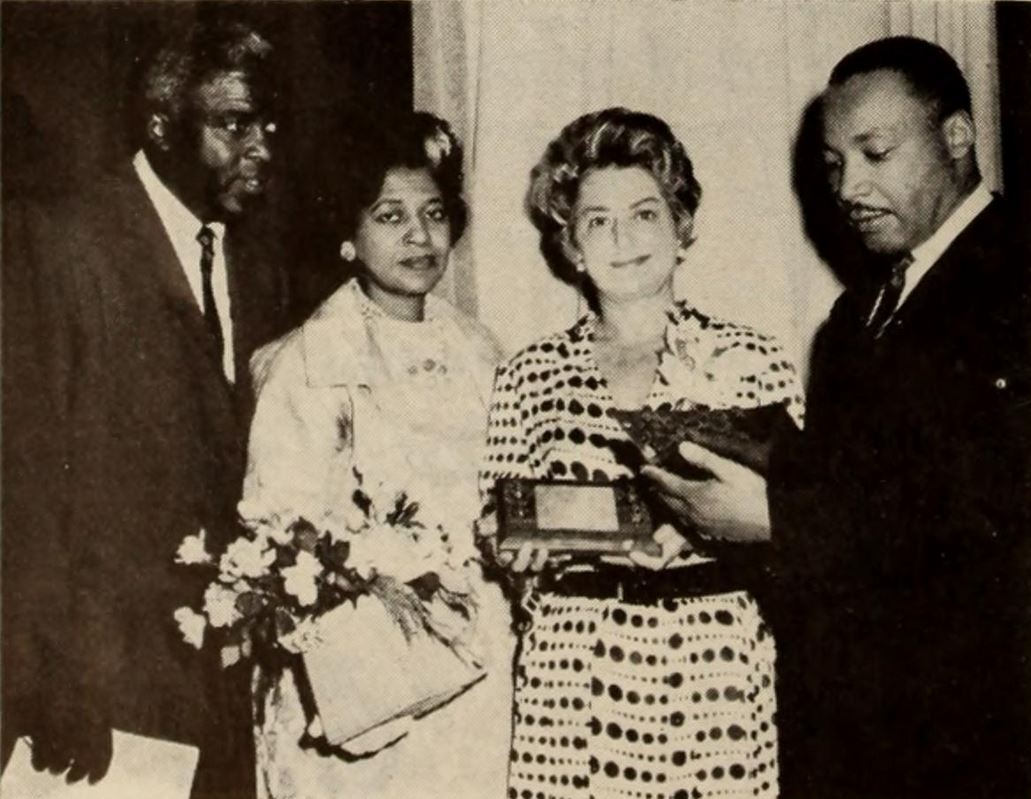
l-r: Jackie Robinson, Mary Dee, station owner Dolly Banks, and Martin Luther King Jr., presentation of the Brotherhood Award from the Baptist Ministers' Conference to WHAT radio station, 1962

As was common for entertainment figures, Dee lent her time to numerous charitable causes, often choosing to work with teenagers. She raised money for schools and mentored young musicians like George Benson to help them start their music careers. Every month she gave away records to community centers, youth homes, and veteran centers, often totaling 200 discs per month. She hosted events to raise money for community improvement projects, receiving many awards and honors from civic groups. She was active in Alpha Gamma Chi and Iota Phi Lambda, business sororities aimed at providing better opportunities for black women, as well as the NAACP and the National Council of Negro Women. Dee was one of the first two black women admitted to the Association of American Women in Radio and Television, the other being Alma John. (Note: Some sources indicate Dee was one of the first black members, while others claim she was the first.) Campaigning together, they succeeded in obtaining a pledge from the organization to refrain from holding meetings in segregated facilities.

== Death and legacy ==
Dee died on March 17, 1964, at Hahnemann University Hospital in Philadelphia from colon cancer. She was honored with two funeral services, one held at Jones Memorial Baptist Church in Philadelphia, the other at the Clark Memorial Baptist Church in Homestead, attended by thousands of mourners. She was buried in Restland-Lincoln Memorial Park Cemetery in Monroeville, Pennsylvania, alongside family members. The Jones Memorial Baptist Church established a scholarship in her name.

She is widely reported to have been the first black woman disc jockey in the United States, though tracing ethnic broadcasting is difficult at a time when there were few opportunities for African Americans and other minorities who were often ignored by the media. (Note: Vivian Carter also began her career as a radio disc jockey in 1948, after winning a contest hosted by WGES in Chicago.) In 2011, Dee was honored by the Media Association of Pittsburgh with the Thomas J. MacWilliams Lifetime Achievement Award.
