= Alma Vessells John =

African-American broadcaster (1906–1986)

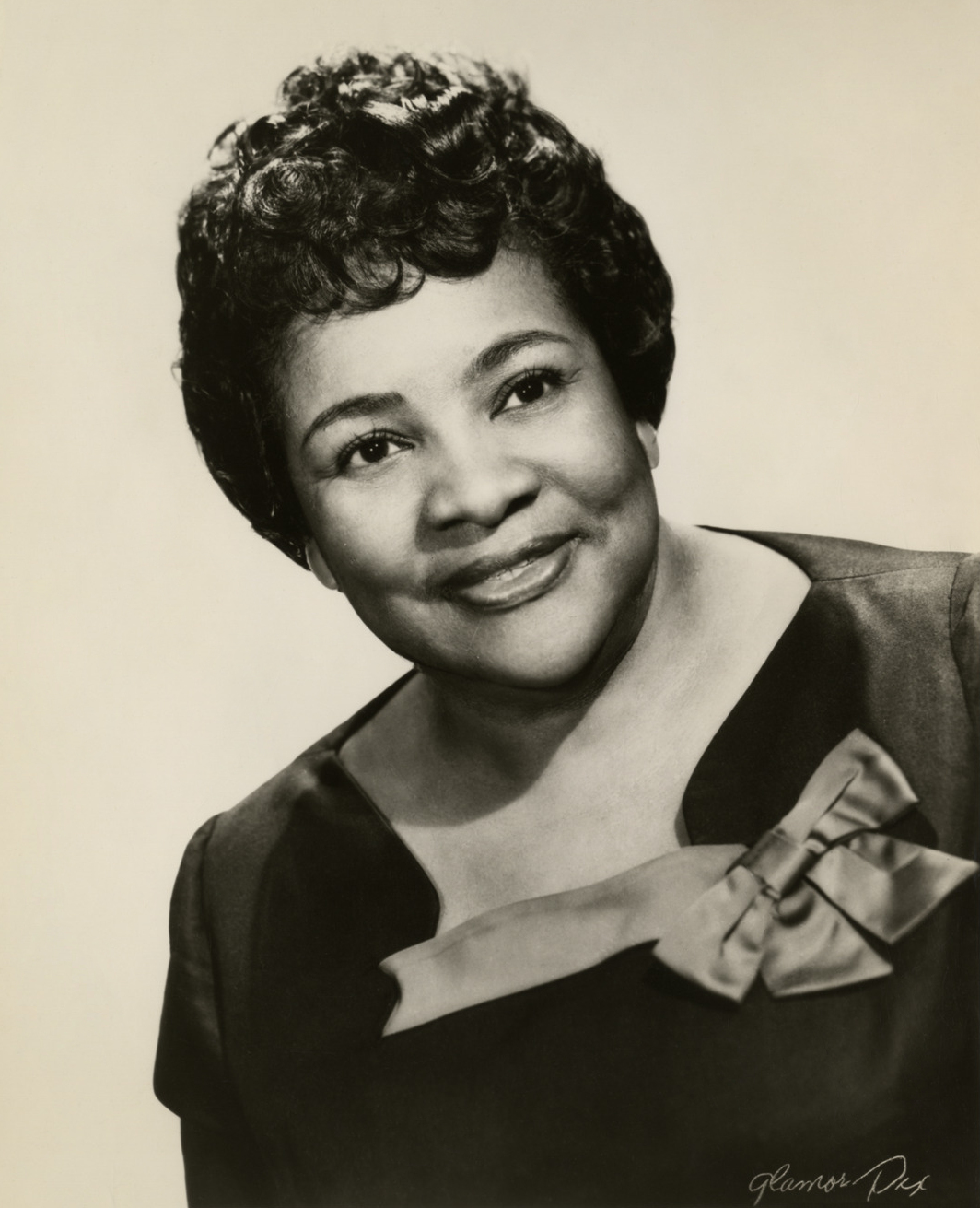
- John in 1963
- Born: Alma Vessells; September 27, 1906; Philadelphia, Pennsylvania, US
- Died: April 8, 1986 (aged 79); New York City, US
- Other names: Alma Vessels John; Alma John
- Education: Harlem Hospital School of Nursing; New York University
- Occupations: Nurse; civil rights activist; newsletter writer; radio and television personality
- Years active: 1929–1986

Alma Vessells John (September 27, 1906 – April 8, 1986) was an American nurse, newsletter writer, radio and television personality, and civil rights activist. Born in Philadelphia in 1906, she moved to New York to take nursing classes after graduating from high school. She completed her nursing training at Harlem Hospital School of Nursing in 1929 and worked for two years as a nurse before being promoted to the director of the educational and recreational programs at Harlem Hospital. After being fired for trying to unionize nurses in 1938, she became the director of the Upper Manhattan YWCA School for Practical Nurses, the first African American to serve as director of a school of nursing in the state of New York. (Adah Belle Thoms had served as acting director of Lincoln School for Nurses between 1906 and 1923). In 1944, John became a lecturer and consultant with the National Nursing Council for War Service, serving until the war ended, and was the last director of the National Association of Colored Graduate Nurses from 1946 until it dissolved in 1951. Her position at both organizations was to expand nursing opportunities for black women and integrate black nurses throughout the nation into the health care system.

In 1949, John wrote a script titled Brown Women in White for production on WNBC, which led to a second career in radio and television. In 1952, she presented The Homemaker's Club on station WWRL in New York. The following year, she became the first black radio personality to be invited as a member of the New York chapter of the Association of Women in Radio and Television. She campaigned successfully for the organization meetings to be held in unsegregated facilities. In 1957, she received the McCall's Golden Mike Award for her show What's Right with Teenagers and in 1959 she became the director of women's programming at WWRL. Over her 25-year career at the radio station, she wrote and produced numerous programs giving household tips, health care advice, and providing community service information. In 1970, John began appearing on television shows at WPIX-TV. She interviewed prominent black figures on her shows Black Pride and Positively Black. John worked up to her death in 1986 and is remembered mainly for her pioneering role in radio.

== Early life and education ==
Alma Vessells (Note: Her birth name was initially recorded as Hattie, but the birth certificate was later corrected to Alma.) was born on September 27, 1906, in Philadelphia, Pennsylvania, to Hattie (née Taylor) and Joseph Vessells. (Note: Records are mixed as to whether her name is spelled as Vessells or Vessels.) She came from a family of nine siblings, which struggled with poverty. Her mother died when she was twelve and Vessells, as the oldest child, helped raise her younger siblings. Her father was a carpenter and Vessells worked as a domestic and vegetable peeler to earn money. The family read Negro World, published by Marcus Garvey, which strongly impacted her work ethic and ethnic pride. After graduating from high school, she moved to New York City, to study nursing. She enrolled at the Harlem Hospital School of Nursing in 1926 and graduated in 1929.

== Career ==
=== Nursing (1929–1951) ===
After earning her license to practice, Vessells worked as a nurse at Harlem Hospital. In 1930, she was hired as the director of the educational and recreational programs for them. While working there, she met Cornwall Lisley John, whom she would marry on October 1, 1937. Lisley was a barber from Saint Vincent in the British West Indies, who worked in New York. In October 1938, John tried to unionize the nurses to demand higher pay and better working conditions and was fired by the hospital.

Though a petition to get her job back was presented to the Civil Service convention held in New York that year, John accepted a new post in 1938 as the director of Harlem's Upper Manhattan YWCA School for Practical Nurses. In taking the position, John became the first African-American woman to direct a school of practical nurses in New York State. John remained with the YWCA until 1944, when she left to work as a lecturer and consultant with the National Nursing Council for War Service. Working as an assistant to Estelle Massey Riddle, she helped to eliminate the nursing shortage by increasing the number of black nurses. Their goal was to establish training programs for black students and to provide instruction to nursing school administrators, directors, and public officials on how to increase enrollment. Riddle and John pointed out that segregated schools in the United States meant that many black students needed improvements to their basic education in order to complete nursing training, and encouraged schools to develop curricula that would provide for a well-rounded education.

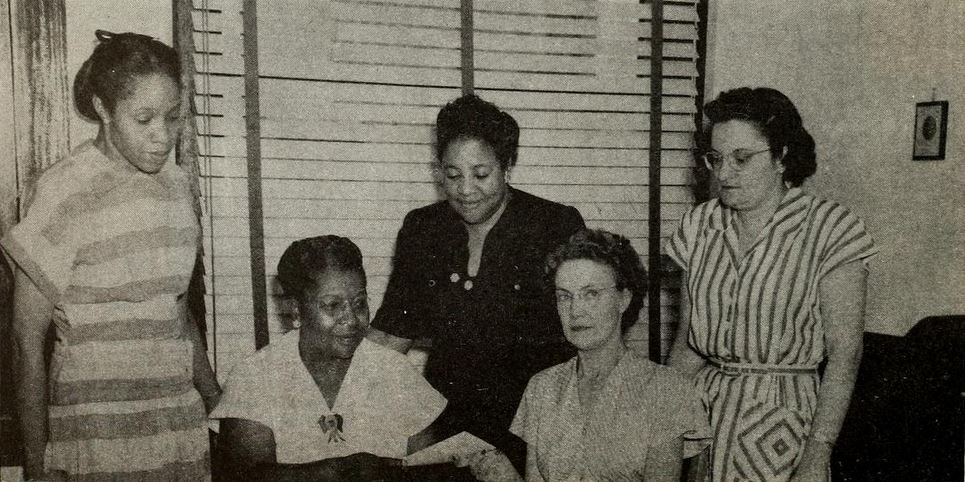
John, circa 1949 with women who integrated the North Carolina Nurses Association

During this time, John returned to school, joined Alpha Kappa Alpha, and completed her Bachelor of Science in 1946 at New York University in education and public health nursing. At the end of the year, she was the first nurse elected to membership on the National Committee on Children and Youth, a group organized to advise legislators about issues effecting young people. Soon after her graduation, she became the executive secretary of the National Association of Colored Graduate Nurses. Her role as director was to remove barriers and racial policies which prohibited the advancement of black nurses. A second major part of her position was to assist with the transition of merging the National Association of Colored Graduate Nurses into the American Nurses Association. She traveled around the South trying to smooth over concerns of white nurses about the merger, while trying to reassure black nurses that the merger could improve their professional status and open opportunities.

To reach broader audiences and expand nursing opportunities, John began broadcasting programs on the radio. In 1949, she wrote a script Brown Women in White for production on WNBC, which led to a consultation with Margaret Cuthbert, an NBC programming executive, for other radio work. The show covered 40 years of the struggle for black women to work as nurses and was aired nationwide on 69 stations. She continued to work as a consultant for the National Nursing Council for War Service until the war ended, and served as the last director of the National Association of Colored Graduate Nurses until it dissolved in 1951.

In 1950, John was appointed as a delegate to the National Association for the Advancement of Colored People's National Mobilization for Civil Rights. She was among the delegates chosen to speak directly with President Harry Truman about pressing needs of the black community and the need for civil rights legislation. The delegates stressed that the primary focus should be on the unrestricted right to vote by elimination of poll taxes and a federal anti-lynching law, but the administration chose to focus on fair employment practices legislation. At the end of her tenure with the National Association of Colored Graduate Nurses, John reported that prior to World War II, only 14 nursing schools throughout the country admitted black students. By 1950, nationally, 304 nursing schools allowed African-American students. She also noted that only five states still prohibited black nurses from joining associations, though there were still gaps in opportunity and pay nationwide.

=== Radio and television (1952–1978) ===
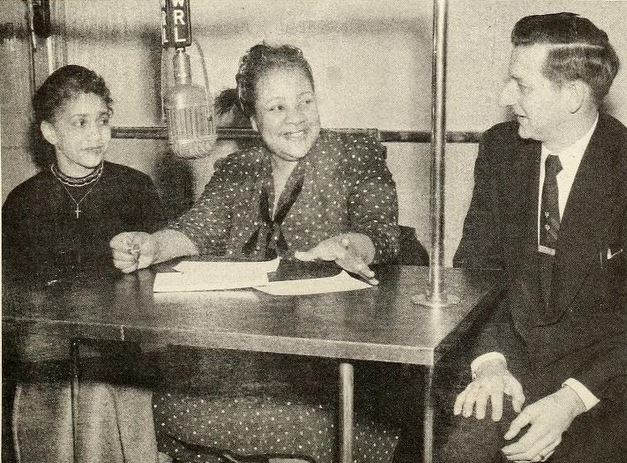
John (center) during an episode of the Homemaker's Club on WWRL featuring the work of the Joshua School of the AHRC New York City with Anna Collins (left) and Assistant Director, Rudolf P. Hormuth (right), 1950s

In 1952, John began writing and presenting The Homemaker's Club on the New York station WWRL. Initially the program was a 15-minute spot, but was soon expanded to a half-hour show in the station's drive to attract women listeners. The show mixed household tips with conversation by John and her guests, which focused on social issues and community affairs and ran nationwide five days per week. That same year, she and her husband began offering a concierge service, which they called the House of Service, for visitors to New York. Because of her extensive travel experience, she recognized the difficulty when traveling of making arrangements in an unknown city and their business helped travelers with informational requests, researching travel arrangements, setting reservations, and finding service providers for various needs. In 1953, John became the first black woman admitted to the New York chapter of the Association of Women in Radio and Television. She ran a successful campaign with Mary Dee Dudley, the first African-American female disc jockey in the United States, for the association to adopt a policy that all of their meetings would be held in non-segregated facilities.

Beginning in 1954, John produced the radio programs Alma John Talks to Teens and What's Right with Teenagers, the latter broadcasting three times a week. These shows encouraged black youth to complete their education and strive for career opportunities, inspiring many to dream of entering the broadcasting business. What's Right with Teenagers was produced and directed by teenagers, and John helped them write scripts, plan programs, schedule interviews, and taught them to use the recording technology. Working with their schools, she also offered career advice and helped many of the students find employment. In 1957, she was awarded the McCall's Golden Mike Award at the national convention of the Association of Women in Radio and Television held in San Francisco for her work on What's Right with Teenagers. She was the first black woman to receive the award. In 1959, she was promoted to director of women's programming for WWRL.

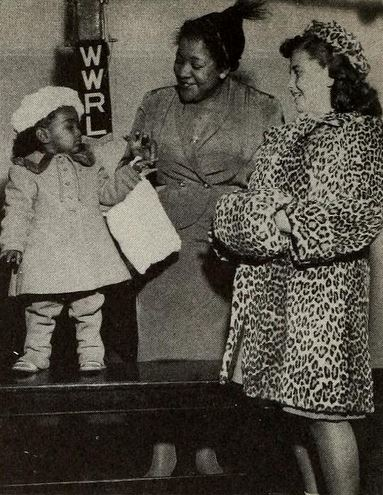
John, (center) "Furs for Moppets" episode of the Homemaker's Club on WWRL with Regina Berry (left) and Valerie Libuti (right), 1950s

Over her 25-year association with WWRL, she produced various syndicated series on household hints, like Alma John Shoppers' Guide, At Home With Alma John, Household Hints and Speak of Color, which featured advice on budgeting, credit, decorating, and nutrition. She produced a wide variety of shows including The World at Your Doorstep, an interview show featuring talks with foreign visitors and a program geared to senior citizens called Golden Agers. Other programs included public service projects such as information on health and civil rights issues, along with well-known guests like Eleanor Roosevelt. In 1960, she was honored by the National Urban League, and throughout her career received numerous awards and honors from various civic organizations.

In 1970, she was approached by New York City television station WPIX to host a program about black issues and achievements. For two years she hosted Black Pride, before becoming the show's producer in 1972. The program ran twice each week and featured a wide variety of guests, including Coretta Scott King, Ella Fitzgerald, Edythe J. Gaines, Roberta Flack, Rosa Parks, and Pamela Strobel (aka Princess Pamela), among others. She also hosted the talk series Positively Black. Her last television production was a talk show, Like It Is, which was produced for WPIX in 1978.

=== Later career (1977–1986) ===
John hosted the Alma John Workshops and published a newsletter of the same name from 1979 to 1986. The workshops aimed to promote community uplift, education, and public health. They offered community members of all ages a place to share their creative works and organized events for participation, like visiting prisons, detention centers, or children's homes. In connection with the workshops, she traveled widely and spoke to various organizations and groups.

== Death and legacy ==
John died at Harlem Hospital on April 8, 1986, after suffering a stroke the previous day. Her funeral was held at Saint Paul Baptist Church of Harlem on April 12 and on May 1, the United States House of Representatives paid tribute to her memory. She was remembered for her contributions in the fight for civil rights, nursing, and as a pioneer radio personality. She influenced the careers of numerous media communications professionals like Gary Byrd, Pablo Guzmán, David Lampel, and Gil Noble, among others. John's papers were willed to the Schomburg Center for Research in Black Culture in New York City, which received them in 1990. She was one of the radio pioneers featured on the Smithsonian Productions documentary series Black Radio: Telling It Like It Was created by Jacqueline Gales Webb in 1996. The archival records of the program, including taped interviews with John are housed at the Indiana University Archives of African American Music and Culture in Bloomington.
