= WAMO =

WAMO may refer to:

- WAMO (AM), a radio station (660 AM) licensed to Wilkinsburg, Pennsylvania, United States
- WAOB (AM), a radio station (860 AM) licensed to Millvale, Pennsylvania, which used the call sign WAMO from 1956 until 2009
- WAOB-FM, a radio station (106.7 FM) licensed to Beaver Falls, Pennsylvania, which used the call sign WAMO-FM from 1960 until 2009
- Warner Advanced Media Operations (WAMO), a division of WEA Manufacturing
- The Washington Monument in Washington, D.C.

== See also ==
- Guamo language, an extinct language also known as Wamo
- Wham-O
- Waymo
