= WAOB =

WAOB may refer to:

- WAOB (AM), a radio station (860 AM) licensed to Millvale, Pennsylvania, United States
- WAOB-FM, a radio station (106.7 FM) licensed to Beaver Falls, Pennsylvania, United States
