= Hazel Johnson-Brown =

U.S. Army general (1927–2011)

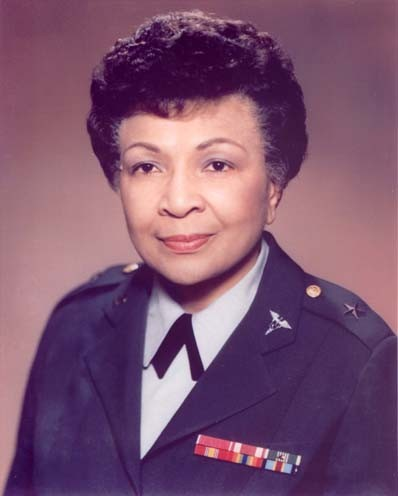
- Johnson-Brown as a brigadier general, circa 1979
- Born: October 10, 1927; West Chester, Pennsylvania, US
- Died: August 5, 2011 (aged 83); Wilmington, Delaware, US
- Burial place: Arlington National Cemetery
- Military career
- Allegiance: United States
- Branch: United States Army
- Service years: 1955–1983
- Rank: Brigadier General
- Commands: United States Army Nurse Corps
- Awards: Army Distinguished Service Medal; Legion of Merit; Meritorious Service Medal; Army Commendation Medal (2)

Hazel Winifred Johnson-Brown (October 10, 1927 – August 5, 2011) was a nurse and educator who served in the United States Army from 1955 to 1983. In 1979, she became the first Black female general in the United States Army and the first Black chief of the United States Army Nurse Corps. She was also the Director of the Walter Reed Army Institute of Nursing.

== Early life ==
Hazel Winifred Johnson was born on October 10, 1927, in West Chester, Pennsylvania. She was the daughter of Clarence L. Johnson Sr. and Garnett Henley Johnson. Johnson was one of seven children, she had four brothers and two sisters. Her parents were farmers who made a living from livestock and selling fruits and vegetables.

As a child Johnson attended East Whiteland Elementary School with her siblings. She later attended Tredyffrin-Easttown Junior Senior High School, where she was considered an exceptional student.

At the age of 12, Johnson wanted to become a nurse. Johnson applied and was denied admission to Chester County Hospital School of Nursing for being black. She then moved to New York City to attend the Harlem School of Nursing in 1947. Johnson's nursing career started at the Harlem Hospital emergency ward as a beginning level staff nurse.

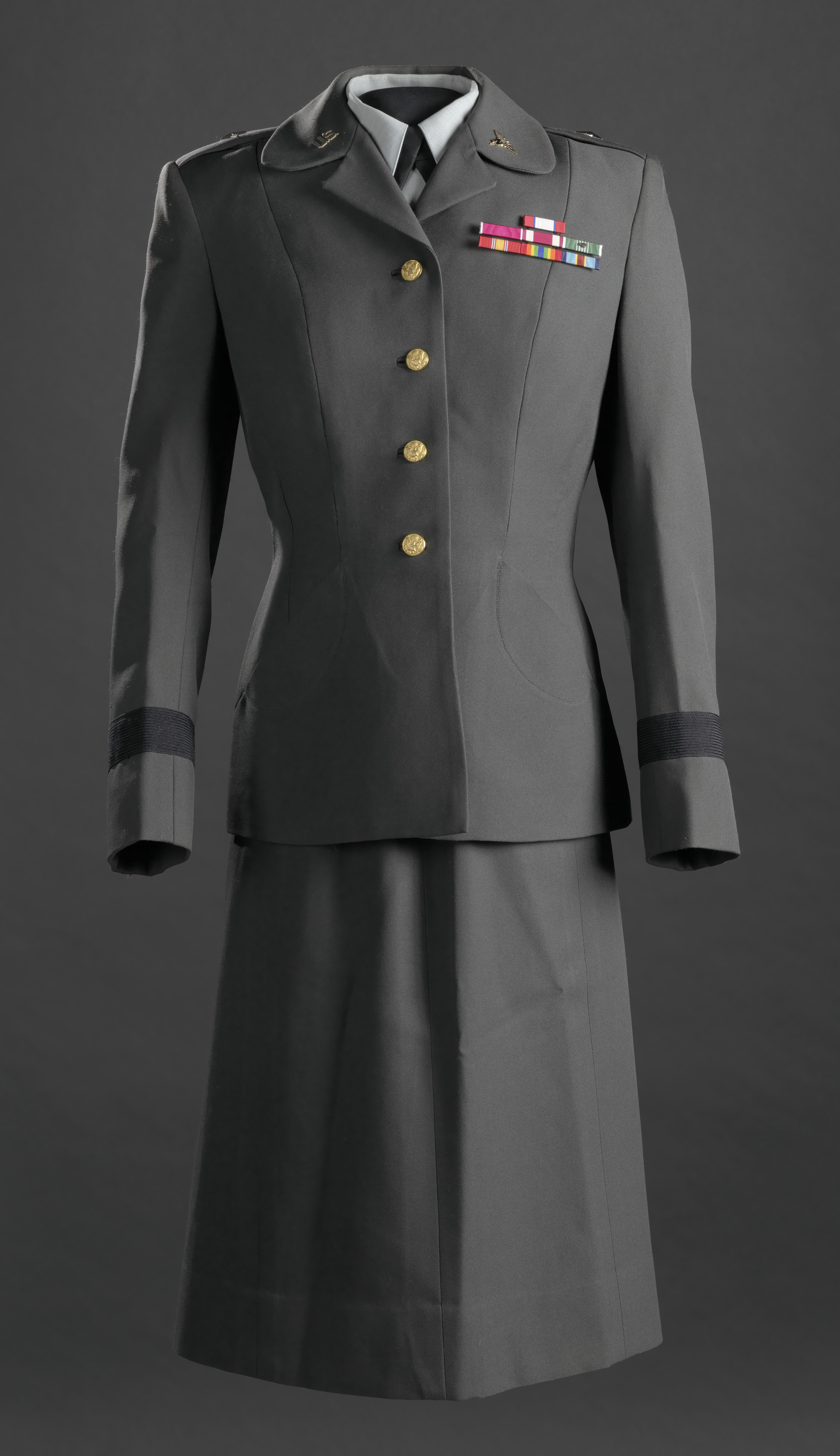
Women's US Army Service uniform worn by Brigadier General Hazel Johnson-Brown

== Military career ==
Hazel Johnson-Brown enlisted in the United States Army in 1955, seven years after President Harry Truman eliminated segregation in the military. Johnson-Brown's obituary states she rose "in the ranks as she impressed her superiors with her skill in the operating room". She was a talented surgeon who took assignments across the world, including Asia. Johnson-Brown served in Japan, and trained nurses on their way to Vietnam. She was assigned to go to Vietnam as well, but fell ill. The unit was attacked shortly after arriving in Vietnam and the nurse who took Johnson-Brown's place was killed in the surprise attack along with numerous others of the group. In 1977 Johnson-Brown was mentioned in the magazine Ebony, where referred to her as "one of the real 'heavies' in her field". The magazine also anticipated Johnson-Brown to become "the first black woman general".

Twenty-four years later she made history when she was promoted to brigadier general. With this promotion she took charge of 7,000 nurses in the Army Nurse Corps; the first black woman to hold the post. During Johnson-Brown's promotion she was quoted saying "Race is an incidence of birth" then furthering this by saying "I hope the criterion for selection did not include race but competence". She obtained a bachelor's degree in nursing from Villanova University in 1959, a masters in teaching from Columbia University in 1963, and a doctorate in educational administration from The Catholic University of America in 1978. Her career was distinguished she won many a medal, including the Army Distinguished Service Medal, and was awarded army nurse of the year twice. She was also awarded a Meritorious Service Medal and Army Commendation Medal with oak leaf cluster.

== Post-military career ==
After Johnson-Brown retired from the army in 1983 she headed the American Nurses Association's government relations unit as well as directed the George Mason University's Center for Health Policy as an assistant professor and later a professor on her own. A key to Johnson-Brown's success was driven by her immense well-rounded personality as well as her intellect. Johnson-Brown treated everyone the same and demanded that in return. "She recalled going with her mother to a hot dog stand in Philadelphia. Several times the waitress walked past them to serve white customers first. When the waitress finally delivered their order, Gen. Johnson-Brown turned it away. 'Now you eat it,' she told the waitress. To her mother she said, 'Let's go.'" In an interview she stated that she was never a "quiet dissenter" when it came to slights she suffered as a black woman, inside uniform and outside as well. She "always was a people person," her sister Gloria Smith remarks. Johnson-Brown's marriage to David Brown ended in divorce without children. Johnson-Brown developed Alzheimer's disease in later life.

In 1990, during Operation Desert Storm, Johnson-Brown volunteered to work in the surgical suite at Fort Belvoir, Virginia's Army Hospital. Johnson-Brown spent her last remaining years with her sister, Gloria Smith, in Wilmington, Delaware.

== Personal life and legacy ==
In 1981, Johnson married David Brown. She added on his name to hers and was known from then on as Hazel Johnson-Brown. However, their marriage did not last and they eventually divorced.

Johnson-Brown was a Catholic, a member of St. Clare in Clifton, Virginia (where her funeral Mass was held).

Johnson-Brown died in Wilmington, Delaware, on August 5, 2011, at the age of 83. She was en route to the hospital; after her arrival, it was realized that the cause of Johnson-Brown's death was Alzheimer's disease. She was buried at Arlington National Cemetery.

When remembering Johnson-Brown, Army Nurse Corps historian Lieutenant Colonel Nancy Cantrell explained that "Brigadier General Hazel Johnson-Brown was remarkable in that she commanded during a transitional period for the Army Nurse Corps and led with dignity and style; she was considered a great leader of the Corps and was well respected and loved".

== Honors ==
- Candace Award, Health, National Coalition of 100 Black Women, 1984.
- Honorary degree, Long Island University, 1997.
