= Margaret Cuthbert =

Canadian-born American radio broadcaster

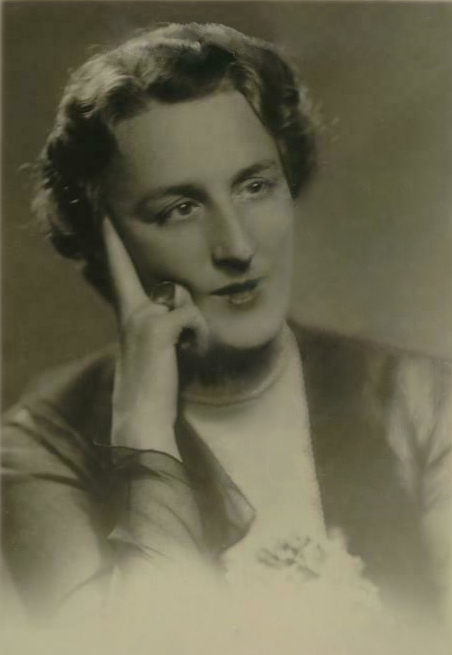
- Cuthbert in 1936
- Born: Margaret Ross Cuthbert; 12 May 1887; Prince Albert, Saskatchewan, Canada
- Died: 25 July 1968 (aged 81); Hyannis, Massachusetts
- Occupations: Radio broadcaster, executive
- Years active: 1924–1952
- Partner: Alice Blinn

Margaret Cuthbert (12 May 1887 – 25 July 1968) was a Canadian-born radio broadcaster in the United States. After earning a degree in fine art from Cornell University, she worked briefly at the British Embassy in Washington, D.C., and at Cornell, before embarking on a radio career in 1924. She was initially the director of speakers and was promoted to Director of Talks when NBC took over WEAF from AT&T. She became known for the range of celebrities she was able to secure to broadcast readings and presentations. Later, she was promoted to Director of Women's Activities, Director of the Children's Department and Director of Public Affairs.

Among the programs Cuthbert produced were NBC Theater, as well as its precursor World's Greatest Novels. She also produced Consumer Time, Echoes of History, Gallant American Women, Round the World, Stories to Order, and Tales of our Foreign Service. In addition to her production, Cuthbert gave lectures, wrote books and articles, and worked with organizations to develop programming that would be beneficial on both local and national levels for women and children. She received numerous honors from Women's organizations throughout her career for her pioneering career in radio.

== Early life and education ==
Margaret Ross Cuthbert was born on 12 May 1887 in Prince Albert, Saskatchewan, Canada, to Charlotte and Major Albert Edward Ross Cuthbert. She had two brothers and was raised with a love for nature and horseback riding. Her father served in the Royal Canadian Mounted Police, as an assistant commissioner, causing the family to move often. Among their residences were Dawson City and Whitehorse in the Yukon and Edmonton, Alberta. She completed her secondary schooling at Dawson City High School. Though her father opposed Cuthbert obtaining higher education, she attended Cornell University and earned a degree in fine arts in 1908. During her time at Cornell, she met Alice Blinn, who would become her life-long partner. Returning to Maple Creek, Saskatchewan, where her parents were then living, Cuthbert bowed to her father's wishes for her to spend a year learning to cook.

== Career ==
In 1917, Cuthbert moved to Washington, D.C., to work at the British embassy. After a year, she began working as a secretary in the Home Economics department at Cornell. After 18 months, she resigned and moved to New York City, with the ambition of becoming a writer. She resumed her relationship with Blinn and the two women lived together with Cuthbert's widowed mother and a housekeeper in an apartment. Spurred by a radio broadcast in which a reader with a droning monotone reported, "Alabama casts 24 votes for Oscar W. Underwood", she decided to work in radio. In 1924, she went to work at American Telephone and Telegraph Company's (AT&T's) affiliate WEAF, as Director of Speakers. She produced shows and also announced speakers, and ensured that various segments of the live productions continued without interruption.

When the National Broadcasting Company's NBC Radio Network was organized and took over WEAF as its flagship station in 1926, Cuthbert was made an executive of the firm and Director of Talks. Drawing on her experience from Cornell when she organized campus speakers, she organized a range of authors, doctors, educators, explorers, philanthropists, scientists, and women leaders to present on NBC. Guests included Lady Astor, Amelia Earhart, John Galsworthy, Vachel Lindsay, Emily Post, Eleanor Roosevelt, and many others. In 1932, Cuthbert convinced Edna St. Vincent Millay, a friend she had corresponded with since 1926, to read her poetry on the airwaves. It marked the first time that a literary figure with an international reputation was broadcast on equal footing and pay with actors and singers. In 1934, Blinn and Cuthbert bought a summer home in Connecticut and the following year, Blinn assisted Cuthbert in attaining naturalization as a US citizen.

In 1935, she was placed in charge of the new Women's Activities Department. She produced four weekly programs: Stories to Order, featuring storytellers; Tales of our Foreign Service, providing intrigue from the archives of the Department of State; Consumer Time, aimed at providing information from the War Food Administration; and World's Greatest Novels, part of the University of the Air series. She also made regular appearances at conventions, women's club meetings, and educational gatherings to teach women about the uses of radio and to gain ideas of programming that would be beneficial on both local and national levels for women and children. Cuthbert focused on women because she felt that their voices had previously been underrepresented.

Cuthbert was chosen in 1936 as one of 24 honorees as Women of Achievement by the New York League of Business and Professional Women and in 1941 she was honored by the General Federation of Women's Clubs. In the 1940s, she produced a program called Round the World and was known for her production of Echoes of History, and Gallant American Women. In 1942, she was given the additional responsibility for children's programming. She organized programming for NBC's United Nations Series in 1946 and that year was honored by the National Women's Press Club for her pioneering contributions. In 1948, she retooled World's Greatest Novels, developing and producing NBC Theater, which won a Peabody Award for its adaptations of literature. That year, she was also promoted to Director of Public Affairs.

In addition to her radio work, Cuthbert published articles and books for women and children, about radio. When the Association of American Women in Radio and Television (AAWRT) was founded in 1951, she was selected as its inaugural president. She used her network of contacts to assist Alma Vessels John, one of the first black women to become a radio commentator, to develop contacts to broaden her reach. Cuthbert also nominated John as the first black member of the AAWRT, which was approved in 1953. She retired from NBC in 1952 and she and Blinn moved to Captiva, Florida. They wintered in Florida and spent their summers on Cape Cod.

== Death and legacy ==
Cuthbert died on 25 July 1968 at Cape Cod Hospital in Hyannis, Massachusetts, after a month-long illness. A collection of her and Blinn's letters exchanged over the years from 1924 to 1965 with Eugen Boissevain, Millay, and their family members are housed at Vassar College. An endowment to Cornell's library of $27,500 to purchase books was made in 1983 in Cuthbert's honor by Blinn.

== Selected works ==
- Cuthbert, Margaret (1941). Women and Radio. New York, New York: National Broadcasting Company. OCLC 28361377.
- Cuthbert, Margaret, ed. (1945). Adventure in Radio. New York, New York: Howell, Soskin. OCLC 592808536.
- Cuthbert, Margaret (1946). Your Career in Radio. New York, New York: National Broadcasting Company. OCLC 318457262.
- Cuthbert, Margaret (April 1947). "Treasures in the Air". Today's Woman. Greenwich, Connecticut: Fawcett. OCLC 633160508.
