= WPGR =

WPGR may refer to:

- WPGR (AM), a radio station (1510 AM) licensed to Monroeville, Pennsylvania, United States
- WPGR-LP, a low-power radio station (105.7 FM) licensed to Clear Lake, Wisconsin, United States
