= Laura Holloway Yergan =

American public health nurse (1916–1996)

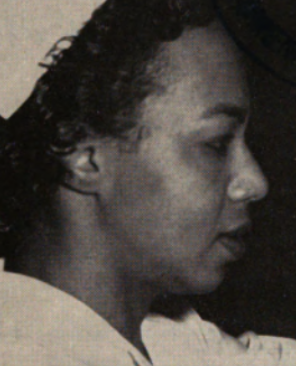
- Laura H. Yergan, from the cover of a 1956 publication of the US International Cooperation Administration
- Born: Laura Ann Holloway; January 18, 1916; New York City
- Died: December 26, 1996 (aged 80); Charlottesville, Virginia
- Occupations: Nurse, nursing educator, college professor, consultant
- Relatives: Max Yergan (brother-in-law); J. Raymond Jones (brother-in-law)

Laura Holloway Yergan (January 18, 1916 – December 29, 1996) was an American public health nurse and nursing educator who often worked internationally, in Africa, the Middle East, Asia, and the Caribbean.

== Early life and education ==
Laura Ann Holloway was born in New York City, the daughter of Laurence E. Holloway and Cheyenne A. Marks Holloway. She graduated from the Harlem Hospital School of Nursing in 1941. She earned a master's degree in nursing education from Teachers College, Columbia University.

Yergan had a sister, Ruth Holloway Jones, who also worked in the Virgin Islands as a customs official; Ruth was married to politician J. Raymond Jones.

== Career ==
Yergan worked as a nurse and later nursing supervisor at Harlem Hospital in the 1940s. In 1950, she went to Liberia as superintendent of nursing education at St. Timothy's Hospital in Robertsport, sponsored by the Episcopal Church. She also taught nursing classes in other African countries, and in Pakistan, Lebanon, Vietnam, Burma, and Barbados. She was an officer in the United States Public Health Service, and was a consultant to the World Health Organization, the United Nations, and the United States Agency for International Development (USAID). She was featured on the cover of the July 1956 issue of the International Cooperation Administration's publication, Technical Cooperation in Health, pinning a nurse's cap onto a young woman student in Saigon.

Yergan was a professor of nursing at the University of the Virgin Islands, and chaired the nursing education division of the university from 1968 until she retired from the university in 1978. Then she returned to Africa, where she worked on nursing education programs in Swaziland, Senegal, and Malawi.

In 1953, Yergan was founding secretary of American Friends of Liberia. She served on the Board of Nurse Licensers in the Virgin Islands, and lead a strike as president of the Virgin Islands State Nursing Association (VISNA). She was a member of the National Association of Colored Graduate Nurses, the NAACP, the League of Women Voters, and other civic and professional organizations.

Yergan was recognized as an outstanding volunteer by the American Association of Retired Persons (AARP) in 1994, after she organized Senior Showcase events in Charlottesville, Virginia, as resource fairs to help older residents and community programs find each other.

== Publications ==
- "West African Mission School" (1952)
- "Report on Visit to Swaziland" (1975)

== Personal life and legacy ==
In 1942, Holloway married Marcus A. (Mark) Yergan, brother of activist Max Yergan. They had a daughter, Catherine. Yergan died in 1996, at the age of 80, in Charlottesville, after a stroke. The University of the Virgin Islands established a scholarship fund and an award in her name.
