= Renee Amoore =

American health care advocate (1953–2020)

Renee Amore
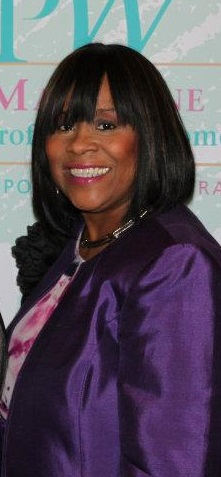
- Renee Amoore in 2015

Republican National Committeewoman from Pennsylvania
- In office 1992–2000

Personal details
- Born: January 24, 1953 Bryn Mawr, Pennsylvania, U.S.
- Died: May 5, 2020 (aged 67)
- Party: Republican
- Occupation: Executive, healthcare advocate, Registered Nurse

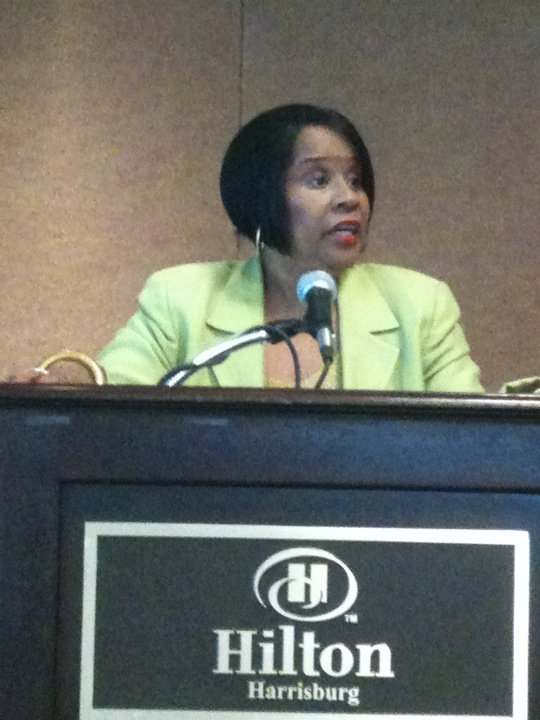
Reneé Amoore speaking at a PAGOP meeting

Renee Amoore R.N. (January 24, 1953 – May 5, 2020) was an American health care advocate and the founder and president of The Amoore Group, Inc.

== Biography ==
Amoore was born in Bryn Mawr, Pennsylvania, to Juanita Ramsey, a domestic worker and nurse, and John Ramsey, a school bus driver. She was one of eight girls in a working-class family.

She attended the Harlem Hospital School of Nursing in New York City and became the head emergency room nurse at Harlem Hospital. In 1979, Amoore earned a bachelor's degree at Antioch College while working as an evening and night program coordinator at the Philadelphia Child Guidance Clinic.

Amoore was granted a master's degree in administration in 1982 from Antioch University. At this time, Amoore was working as a supervisor for Wordsworth Academy's hospital program in Pennsylvania. She was hired by the Philadelphia Center for Developmental Services in 1986.

In 1988, an organization named Growth Horizons, which runs group homes for people with mental illness and substance abuse problems, hired Amoore. In 1996, she became the company's vice president and chief operating officer.

In 1995, Amoore founded the Amoore Group in King of Prussia, Pennsylvania. The Amoore Group is a health care management and consulting firm consisting of Amoore Health Systems, 521 Management Group, and Ramsey Educational and Development Institute.

She was elected to Pennsylvania's Republican State Committee in 1992 and became its deputy chair in 1996.

Amoore taught as an adjunct professor at Drexel University, Antioch University, and Lincoln University. Amoore, who was African-American, was a member of the NAACP, the American Legion Auxiliary, and the advisory board of the African American Museum in Philadelphia. She served as a deacon at Saints Memorial Baptist Church and a guest host on a WHAT-AM community talk show.

Awards and honors she received include the Artemis Award from the Euro-American Women's Council in Greece, the Evelyn McPhail Award for Republican Activist of the Year, the NAACP Award for Community Services in Education, and the Madam C.J. Walker Award from the Coalition of 100 Black Women. Renee Amoore and her husband, Joseph Amoore, had one daughter, Cherie.

Amoore spoke on the third night of the Republican National Convention on September 3, 2008.

Amoore died on May 5, 2020, at the age of 67.
