= Harlem Hospital School of Nursing =

Nursing school in New York City

- Former names: Training School for Colored Nurses of Harlem Hospital; Training School for Nurses of Harlem Hospital
- Type: Public nursing school
- Active: January 3, 1923–1977
- Founders: John Francis Hylan; William Vassall; Lurline Vassall DeShields
- Parent institution: Harlem Hospital Center
- Students: 20 (first year class)
- Location: Harlem, New York City, New York, United States; 40°48′52″N 73°56′18″W
- Campus: urban

Harlem Hospital School of Nursing was a training school for African-American women, which was established at Harlem Hospital in Harlem, New York City in 1923. It was founded due to the lack of nursing schools in New York that accepted African American women. Until 1923, the Lincoln Hospital School for Nurses in The Bronx was the only school that allowed the enrollment of Black women.

== Formation ==
When Mayor Hylan sought reelection in 1921, the NAACP and other community organizations lobbied the mayor to improve healthcare access. Around the same time, Lurline Vassall of Brooklyn, was denied entry to the Bellevue Hospital School of Nursing because of her race. Lurline's father William Vassall launched a campaign to open a school for black nurses. In response, Hylan's administration supported the creation of the Harlem Hospital School of Nursing.

The school opened on January 3, 1923, with a class of twenty black women. It was a two and a half year program. An additional thirteen students were enrolled in April 1923 and another sixteen students were enrolled in September 1923. Thirty-six of these students would go on to graduate on April 23, 1925, becoming the first graduating class.

== Early student experience ==
Students followed a rigorous twelve-hour schedule. This schedule included academic activities as well as work in the hospital. Some of their activities included cleaning, making beds and caring for patients. Students were often subject to the prejudice of white doctors and nurses, many of whom refused to work with black nursing students.

Students were required to wear pink long-sleeved dresses that came down to six inches off the ground. In addition, each wore an attached collar and cuffs and a long white apron. For shoes they were black high tops. The color of the uniform was soon changed from pink to blue. Shortly after being admitted, students attended a capping ceremony in which they received nurse's caps that symbolized their initiation into the school. Some students were surprised that they were not given the same caps as Bellevue students, but instead were given standard caps. Rumors spread that they hadn't received Bellevue caps because of concerns that black hair would be too greasy. In 1949, a committee formed to replace the standard cap with a more unique design. The design chosen featured a distinctive three point brim representing faith, hope and charity.

== Dissolution ==
The Harlem Hospital School of Nursing closed in 1977. The decision to close the school was made in part due to lack of funding.

== Notable alumni and personnel ==
- Renee Amoore
- Goldie Brangman-Dumpson – graduated in 1943
- Rosetta Burke – graduated in 1957.
- Irma Dryden – graduated in 1942
- Alma Vessells John – attended 1926–1929.
- Hazel Johnson-Brown attended 1947–1950 the first Black female general in the United States Army and the first Black chief of the United States Army Nurse Corps.
- Salaria Kea O'Reilly – attended 1930–1934.
- Estelle Massey Osborne – taught in the late 1920s.
- Laura Holloway Yergan, became nursing educator in Africa, Caribbean, Asia, and Middle East

== See also ==
- Adah Belle Thoms

== See also ==
- List of defunct colleges and universities in New York
