= Rosetta Burke =

United States general (born 1937)

Rosetta Y. Burke
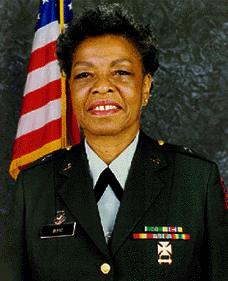
- Born: February 28, 1937 (age 89); Pittsburgh, Pennsylvania
- Military career
- Allegiance: United States
- Branch: United States Army Reserve
- Service years: 1962–1997
- Rank: Major General
- Awards: Army Commendation Medal (2)

Rosetta Y. Burke (born February 28, 1937) is a retired senior officer of the United States Army Reserve. She was the first female Assistant Adjutant General of New York State and of the Army National Guard.

== Education and civilian career ==
Rosetta Burke was born on February 28, 1937, in Pittsburgh, Pennsylvania. Burke attended Harlem Hospital School of Nursing, Adelphi University, and the C.W. Post Center, Long Island University. Burke retired as Superintendent (Warden) from the New York State Department of Corrections in October 1992.

== Military career ==
Burke served with the United States Army Reserve from 1962 to 1992. She joined the New York Army National Guard in 1993, where as served as the Assistant Adjutant General. She retired as a major general in 1997, culminating a military career of over 35 years of service.

Burke was named state director of the Selective Service System for New York by Governor George E. Pataki in 1997. The appointment, made available by President Bill Clinton and was signed by the National Director of the Selective Service System, Gil Coronado. After World War II, no women holding high office existed. She was named to the post in 1994, after serving thirty years. She was the first female general in New York's Army National Guard and the first female in the nation to be promoted to major general. She retired in 1997.

== Memberships ==
Burke is a member of the Reserve Officers Association, The Retired Officers Association, Association for the Military Surgeons of the United States, National Guard Association of the United States, Militia Association of New York, National Black Nurses Association, Black Nurses Association of the Capital District, Harlem Hospital School of Nursing Alumni, American Correctional Association of the United States of America, New York State Minorities in Criminal Justice, and National Association for the Advancement of Colored People.

Burke is also President of the National Association of Black Military Women. She is also an honorary member of Alpha Kappa Alpha sorority.
