= James R. Dumpson =

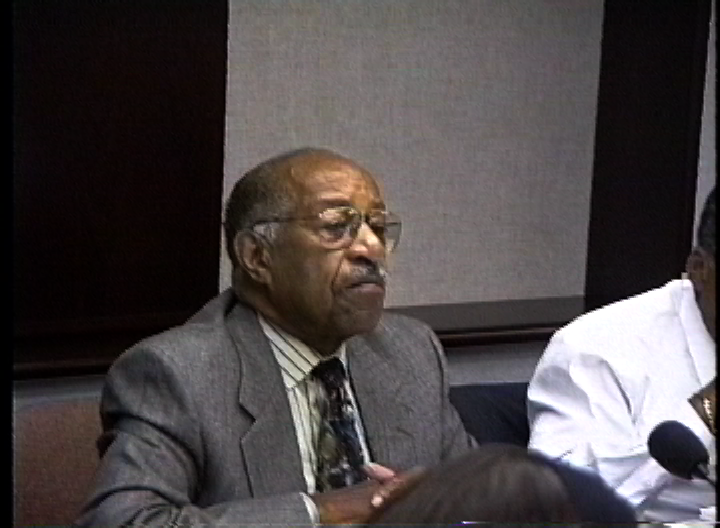
- Dumpson at a 1990 HHC Board meeting
- Born: April 5, 1909
- Died: November 5, 2012 (aged 103)

James Russelle Dumpson (April 5, 1909 – November 5, 2012) was commissioner of the New York City Department of Welfare from 1959 to 1965. At the time of his appointment he was the only African American welfare commissioner in the United States and also the first social worker to hold the position in New York City.

== Life ==
When he first came to New York City, Dumpson was a caseworker at the Children's Aid Society. From 1953 to 1954 he was a United Nations Advisor/ Chief of Training in Social Welfare to the Pakistani Government.

He joined the Department of Welfare in 1955, as director of the Bureau of Child Welfare; in 1958 he was first deputy commissioner until Mayor Robert F. Wagner appointed him Commissioner in 1959. In 1967, Dumpson was dean of the Graduate School of Social Service at Fordham University.

During his administration at the Department of Welfare, Dumpson served on many committees, advisory boards and other related activities, including President John F. Kennedy's Advisory Commission on Narcotic and Drug Abuse. He was named chairman by the U.S. Department of State of the U.S. Delegation to the United Nations Economic Commission on Asia and the Far East which participated in a seminar on child welfare in Bangkok. Closer to home, he led a contingent of 2,000 Welfare Department employees who participated in the March on Washington for Jobs and Freedom on August 28, 1963.

He returned to New York City's welfare department, then (and now) known as the New York City Human Resources Administration/ Department of Social Services in 1974 as administrator and commissioner after repeated requests to do so from Mayor Abraham Beame. He served until 1976.

In addition to his service to the welfare department, Dumpson had academic appointments with New York University, Hunter College, and as mentioned Fordham University Graduate School of Social Service. In 1990, he was appointed chairman of the board of the Health and Hospitals Corporation. In semi-retirement he was a visiting professor at Fordham University and a senior consultant with The New York Community Trust.

== Recognition ==
Dumpson's awards included a named Professional Chair in Child Welfare Studies at the Fordham University Graduate School of Social Service, the Keystone Award for Distinguished service in Social Welfare from the Federation of Protestant Welfare Agencies, the Distinguished Service Medal from the Council on Social Work Education, and Honorary Lifetime Member of the Institute of Social Sciences and Fellow of the New York Academy of Medicine.

On his 100th birthday, Dumpson was honored at the offices of the New York City Human Resources Administration by its current commissioner, Robert Doar.

He also participated in Milton Friedman's "Free to Choose" program, in the chapter "From Cradle to Grave."

== Personal life ==
Dumpson married Harlem Hospital nurse, Goldie Brangman, in the 1940s. The couple had one child.

Dumpson was a convert to Catholicism. He turned 100 on April 5, 2009, and died on November 5, 2012, at the age of 103.
