= Alice Blinn =

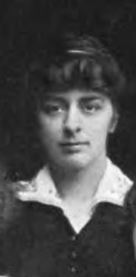
- Blinn, 1916
- Born: Alice M. Blinn; April 18, 1889; Candor, New York, US
- Died: January 20, 1982 (aged 92); Salisbury, Connecticut, US
- Other name: Alice M. Blinn
- Education: Cornell University
- Occupations: educator, home efficiency designer, magazine editor
- Years active: 1917–1952
- Partner: Margaret Cuthbert

Alice Blinn (April 18, 1889 – January 20, 1982) was an American educator, home efficiency expert, and magazine editor. Born in Candor, New York, she attended the New York State normal school and became a teacher. After teaching briefly, in 1913, she entered Cornell University and earned a degree in Domestic Science. While in school, she founded and managed the Cornell Women's Review. After graduation in 1917, she became a food conservation demonstrator for the New York Extension Service and then returned after a year to teach and manage the publications office for the Extension Service at Cornell.

Moving to New York City in the early 1920s, Blinn became a research editor for The Delineator and a designer for the Delineator Home Institute. She designed the kitchen remodel for Dartington Hall in Devon, England, though only part of her plan was utilized. In 1935 she became an associate editor with the Ladies' Home Journal and remained with them until her retirement in 1952. A noted feature series she was involved in during her tenure was a project which remodeled and renovated kitchens of celebrities like Alfred Lunt and Lynn Fontanne, and Edna St. Vincent Millay and Eugen Boissevain. In 1944, she became the sixth woman ever elected to serve on the Board of Trustees of Cornell and served through the early 1950s.

== Early life and education ==
Alice M. Blinn was born on April 18, 1889, in Candor, Tioga County, New York, to Mary S. (née Kenyon) and Samuel E. Blinn. After graduating from Candor High School, she attended the New York State Normal School in Cortland. After completing her teacher certification, Blinn taught briefly before enrolling in the College of Home Economics at Cornell University in 1913. While she was in school she met Margaret Cuthbert, who would become her life partner and in 1915, founded and served as the managing editor of the Cornell Women's Review.

== Career ==
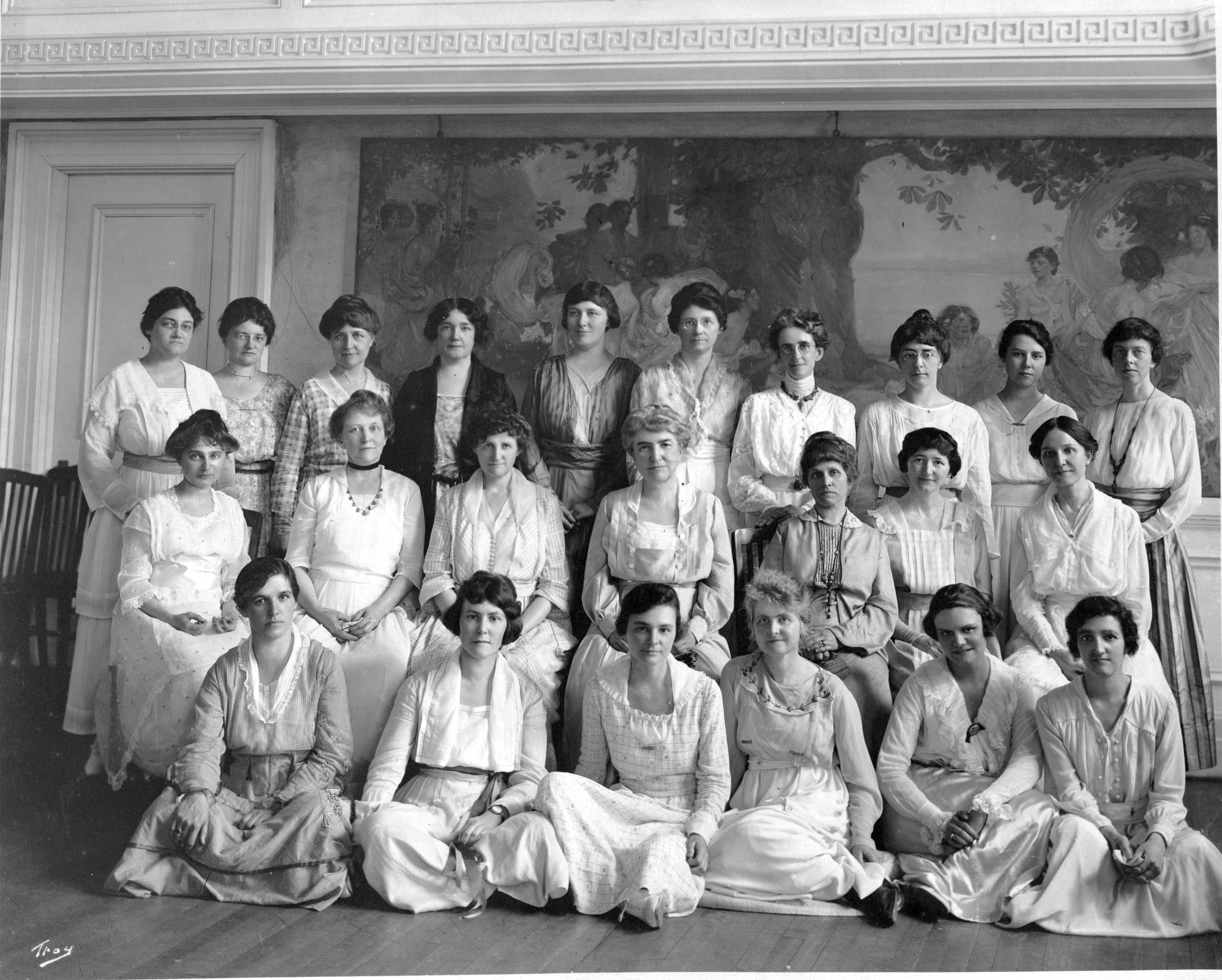
Faculty of the department of home economics about 1918–19. Blinn is in the back row, third from the right

After graduating in 1917 with a Bachelor of Science degree, Blinn worked for Chenango County, as a food conservation agent. After one year, she became a teacher back at Cornell, for the New York Extension Service, which was a partnership between the US Department of Agriculture and Cornell. From 1919, Blinn also headed the publicity and publication for the extension service and produced pamphlets for consumers. Though she remained in charge of the Office of Publications and News Service for the Extension until 1926, Blinn moved to New York City and worked as a consumer consultant with an advertising agency, Barton Durstine and Osborne until 1925, Cuthbert, who had been working in Washington D. C., moved to New York around the same time, and the two women resumed their relationship, moving into an apartment together with Cuthbert, Cuthbert's mother, and a housekeeper.

In 1925, Blinn became an associate research editor with The Delineator and a designer for the Delineator Home Institute. During that time, she served as the director of the Cornell Women's Club from 1927 through 1928 and then as a governor of the American Woman's Association from 1932 to 1940. In 1928, Blinn was contacted by Leonard and Dorothy Elmhirst to design a kitchen for Dartington Hall in Devon, England. The Elmhirsts had bought the derelict estate in 1925, with the idea of creating a model industrial village with a farm, school, manufacturing facilities, as well as entertainment venues for the arts and sporting events. Blinn prepared a report giving an overview of initiatives that could be implemented to improve the domestic activities of the village, including education, apprenticeship programs, a laboratory, as well as a modern kitchen, cafeteria, laundry, and lavatories, with modern equipment and plumbing, based on what was available in a modern American home. Unable to persuade Blinn to move to England and operate a training center, Elmhirst abandoned the plan of a demonstration kitchen. Because the wife of the headmaster did not like the efficient kitchen design, Blinn's recommended equipment was arranged in a typical English manner.

Blinn left The Delineator at the end of 1934 and joined the Ladies' Home Journal in 1935 as an associate editor. In addition to magazine work, she was a regular speaker to educational and women's groups. She was the director of the Federation of Cornell Women's Clubs from 1937 through 1939 and in 1941 joined the University Council as a representative of the College of Home Economics. She received the American Woman's Association's Anna W. Porter Memorial Award in 1939. In 1944, she was elected to the board of trustees for Cornell, as the second woman to serve on the board at that time.

When World War II ended, the Ladies' Home Journal did a series of articles on kitchens, traveling through Connecticut, Massachusetts, Michigan, New Jersey, and Pennsylvania. They selected different home styles, from apartments to mansions to represent a broad section of American living and improved them by remodeling and renovation. They did feature articles on the kitchens of celebrities, like Alfred Lunt and Lynn Fontanne. Blinn worked with the designer-decorator C. Eugene Stephenson to create the layouts and select the appliances. The series also designed the kitchen remodel of Steepletop, home of Blinn's friends Edna St. Vincent Millay and her husband Eugen Boissevain, which was featured in the magazine in 1947. Blinn and Cuthbert both retired in 1952 and moved to Captiva, Florida. They wintered in Florida and spent their summers on Cape Cod, until Cuthbert's death in 1968.

== Death and legacy ==
Blinn died on January 20, 1982, in Salisbury, Litchfield County, Connecticut. A collection of the letters she and Cuthbert exchanged with Millay, Boissevain, and their family members from 1924 to 1965 are housed at Vassar College. Blinn left bequests to the Cornell Plantations and established a book purchasing endowment for the Cornell Library Association in Cuthbert's name.
