= Lucille C. Gunning =

African American pediatrician

Lucille Constance Gunning M.D.
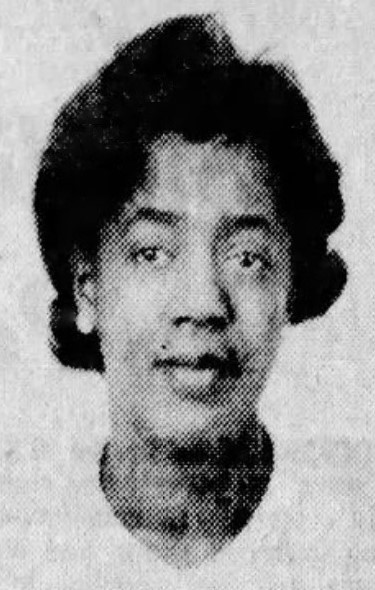
- Lucille C. Gunning, M.D., 1964
- Born: February 21, 1921; New York City, New York
- Died: April 26, 2018 (aged 97); New York
- Education: Bachelor of Arts, New York University; Doctor of Medicine, Woman’s Medical College of Pennsylvania; post graduate training in pediatric cardiology, Yale University; postgraduate training in pediatric oncology, Cancer Memorial Hospital; postgraduate medical training in pediatric psychology, Montefiore Hospital
- Occupation: Physician
- Spouse: Carlton E. Blackwood (d. 1974)
- Children: Alexander, Constance, Isabelle, and Maryanne
- Medical career
- Field: Pediatric oncology

Lucille Constance Gunning (February 2, 1921 – April 26, 2018), also known as Lucille Blackwood, was an African American pediatrician and medical services administrator who became a specialist in the treatment of children's cancer, the director of pediatric rehabilitation at Harlem Hospital and, later, deputy director of medical services of the Westchester Developmental Disabilities Service.

Known for her diagnosis and treatment of children with Sickle cell disease, she was described by the Westchester Black Women's Political Caucus, Inc. as "a true visionary and catalyst for progression for African American doctors and in rehabilitative medicine for children."

== Formative years and family ==
Born in New York City, New York on February 2, 1921, Lucille C. Gunning was the daughter of Roland E. Gunning and Susan C. Gunning (1891-1978).

Educated in Jamaica, West Indies during her youth, Lucille Gunning graduated from high school there, and then earned her Bachelor of Arts degree at New York University and her doctor of medicine degree in 1949 at the Woman's Medical College of Pennsylvania in Philadelphia, where she was the chief pediatric resident. She subsequently pursued post-graduate training as a pediatric cardiology fellow at Yale University and Yale's Grace New Haven Hospital and in pediatric oncology at the Cancer Memorial Hospital in New York City.

She was married to fellow physician, Carlton Earle Blackwood, M.D., a native of Jamaica who was a biochemist and cancer researcher at Columbia University Medical Center before he joined the faculty of the University of the City of New York. She and her husband resided in New Rochelle, New York for many years, and were the parents of four children, Alexander, Constance/Elaina, Isabelle, and Maryanne/Anne. Her husband died on November 29, 1974.

Earlier that same year, in August 1974, her son, Alexander, was awarded the Cornelius H. Teaega Student Fellowship from the New York Arthritis Foundation, and went on to study with Dr. Ines Mandl at Columbia University.

== Medical career ==
Following her completion of her medical studies, Gunning opened a private medical practice with offices in The Bronx, a neighborhood of New York City where she saw patients for a decade, and in New Rochelle, and often provided free care to patients who were struggling financially. After closing her Bronx office in 1964, she earned her sub-specialty qualifications in pediatric psychiatry at Montefiore Hospital.

On October 15, 1964, Gunning and her husband presented a free lecture entitled, "Cancer and the Layman," for a general audience at St. Simon's Episcopal Church in New Rochelle. Their presentation was sponsored by the New Rochelle Cricket Club, an organization with which her husband had been active for a number of years. Her topic was "Clinical Aspects of Cancer in Children"; his was "Trends in Cancer Research."

During the late 1960s and early 1970s, she was a member of the faculty at the Albert Einstein College of Medicine and was also a staff physician and director of pediatric rehabilitation at Montefiore Hospital.

In 1977, she served as a member of the editorial advisory board for the Journal of the National Medical Association.

By 1980, she was director of pediatric rehabilitation at Harlem Hospital. In June of that year, she delivered the keynote address, "Social Perspectives on Violence," for a conference focused on community, family and school violence that was sponsored by the Hudson Valley Regional Organization of the New York State Association of Human Services. During this phase of her career, she also became known for her diagnosis and treatment of children with sickle cell anemia, served as the chair of Harlem Hospital's Child Abuse Committee, and also served on the New York City Mayor's Task Force on Child Abuse."

Before that decade was out, she had been appointed as deputy director of medical services of the Westchester Developmental Disabilities Service.

When she retired from private practice in the 1990s, she concluded a patient diagnostic and treatment career that had spanned forty-five years.

== Community service ==
A member of the Zonta Club, Gunning was elected as first vice president of its New Rochelle chapter in 1998.

== Honors ==
In 2002, Gunning was honored for her healthcare leadership and community service by Sister-to-Sister, an advocacy organization providing economic development, education, health, and self-esteem training and services for African American women and youth.

In 2009, she was among the first group of African American women inducted into the Spirit of Women Archive at Westchester Community College’s Harold Drimmer Library.

In October 2012, Gunning and New York State Senator Suzi Oppenheimer were two of the three women honored as Champions of Change by the Westchester Black Women’s Political Caucus, Inc.

=== Publications ===
- Gunning, L.C. "Management of the handicapped child in central Harlem," in Bulletin of the New York Academy of Medicine, Vol. 50, No. 1, January 1974, pp. 45–49. New York, New York: New York Academy of Medicine, 1974.

== Death and funeral ==
Gunning died in New York on April 26, 2018. Her memorial service was held at the Arigonni Chapel in New Rochelle on June 9.
