= Max Yergan =

American activist (1892–1975)

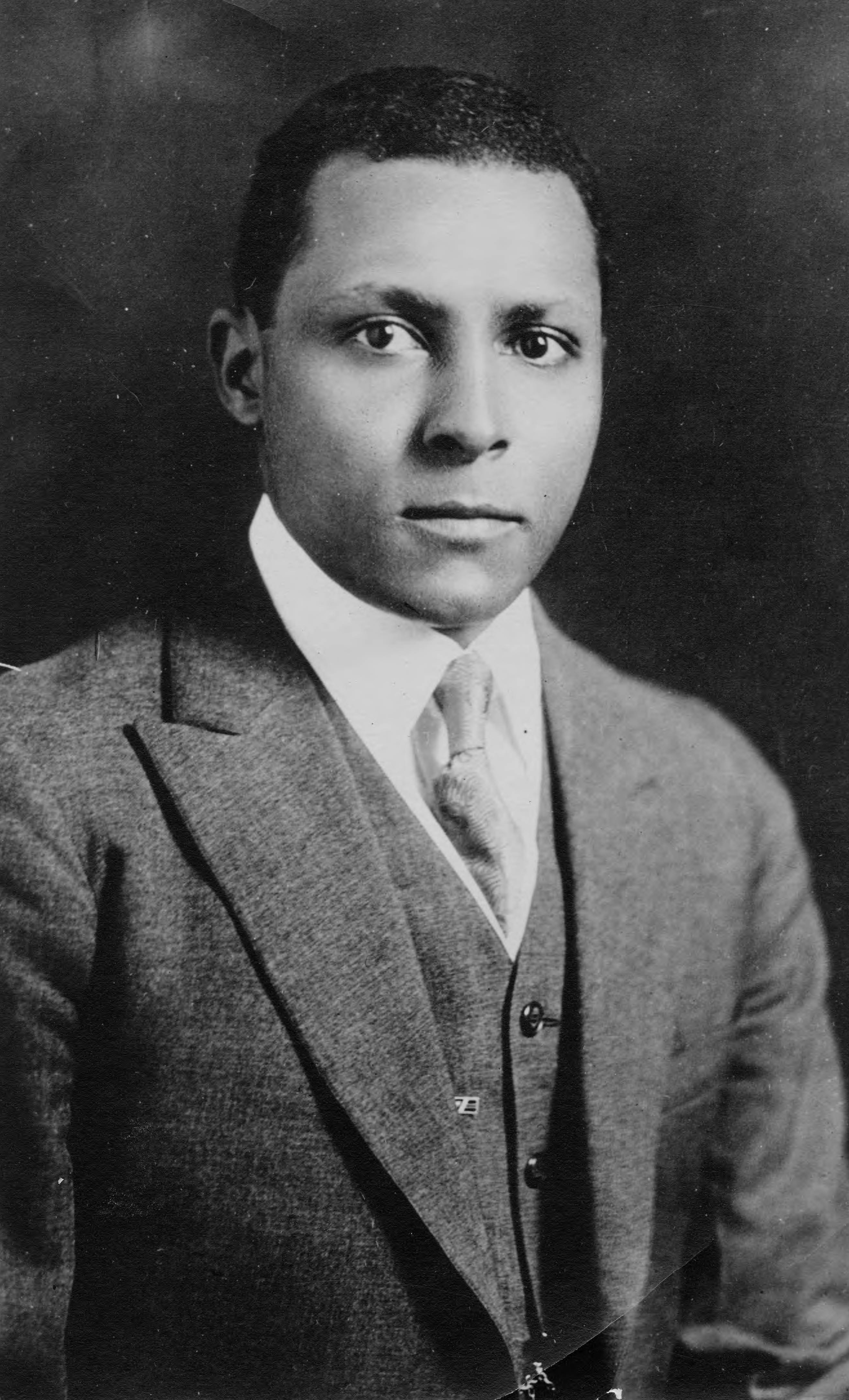
- Yergan c. 1921–1922
- Born: July 19, 1892; Raleigh, North Carolina
- Died: April 11, 1975 (aged 82); Mount Kisco, New York
- Occupations: Activist, missionary
- Relatives: Laura Holloway Yergan (sister-in-law)

Max Yergan (July 19, 1892 – April 11, 1975) was an American activist notable for being a Baptist missionary for the YMCA, then a Communist working with Paul Robeson, and finally a staunch anti-Communist who complimented the government of apartheid-era South Africa and colonial dominion over Africa, particularly in the case of Portuguese Angola. He was a mentor of Govan Mbeki, who later achieved distinction in the African National Congress. He served as the second president of the National Negro Congress, a coalition of hundreds of African-American organizations created in 1935 by religious, labor, civic and fraternal leaders to fight racial discrimination, establish relations with black organizations throughout the world, and oppose the deportation of black immigrants. Along with Paul Robeson, he co-founded the International Committee on African Affairs in 1937, later the Council on African Affairs.

== Youth ==
Max Yergan was born on July 19, 1892, in Raleigh, North Carolina in his grandfather's house to mother Lizzie Yeargan, daughter of Frederick Yeargan. Fred was the source of inspiration for much of Max Yergan's life, as a board member at Shaw Institute and a member of the Baptist church in Raleigh, as well as a man deeply interested in his African heritage. Yergan attended St. Ambrose Episcopal Parish School as a child, and then moved on to attend Shaw University in both the preparatory and college branches. It was there at Shaw that Yergan discovered the YMCA, and in 1916, he joined a missionary trip to India, a trip that would greatly affect the rest of his adult life.

== Career and political work ==
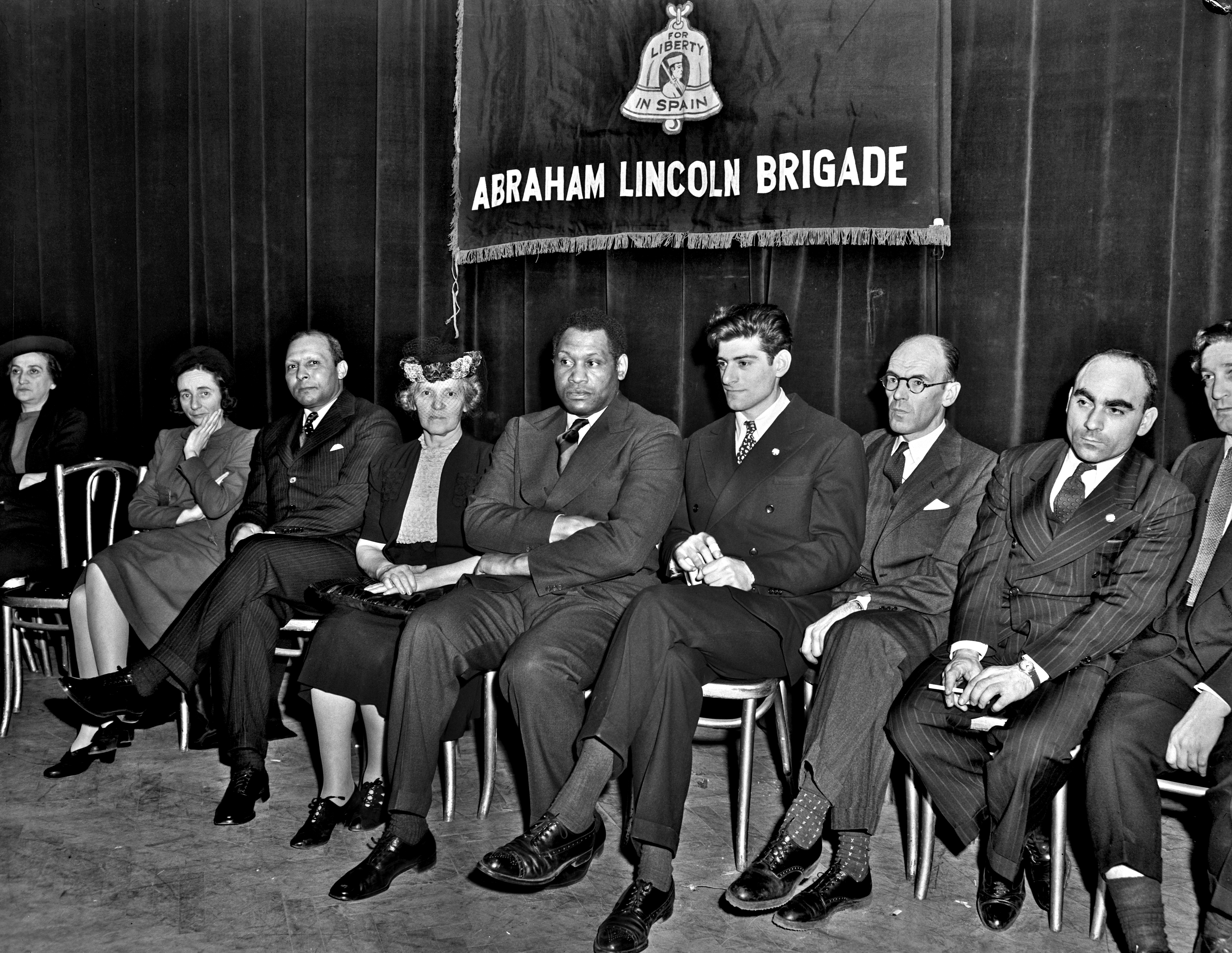
Yergan (third from left) at an event honoring those killed in the Abraham Lincoln Brigade, February 26, 1941. Fifth and sixth from left are Paul Robeson and former Lincoln Battalion commander Milton Wolff.

Yergan came to South Africa in 1920 as a missionary for the YMCA. He was the first African-American to do YMCA work in South Africa. As a YMCA activist he was interested in improving social work in the nation and this influenced the founding of the Jan H. Hofmeyr School of Social Work. As a whole his experiences in South Africa radicalised him to the point he came to desire a more radical direction for the YMCA than it was willing to accept. He failed to radicalise the YMCA and resigned from the organisation in 1936. Two years earlier, in 1934, he had "allegedly [become] a Marxist after making a trip to the Soviet Union."

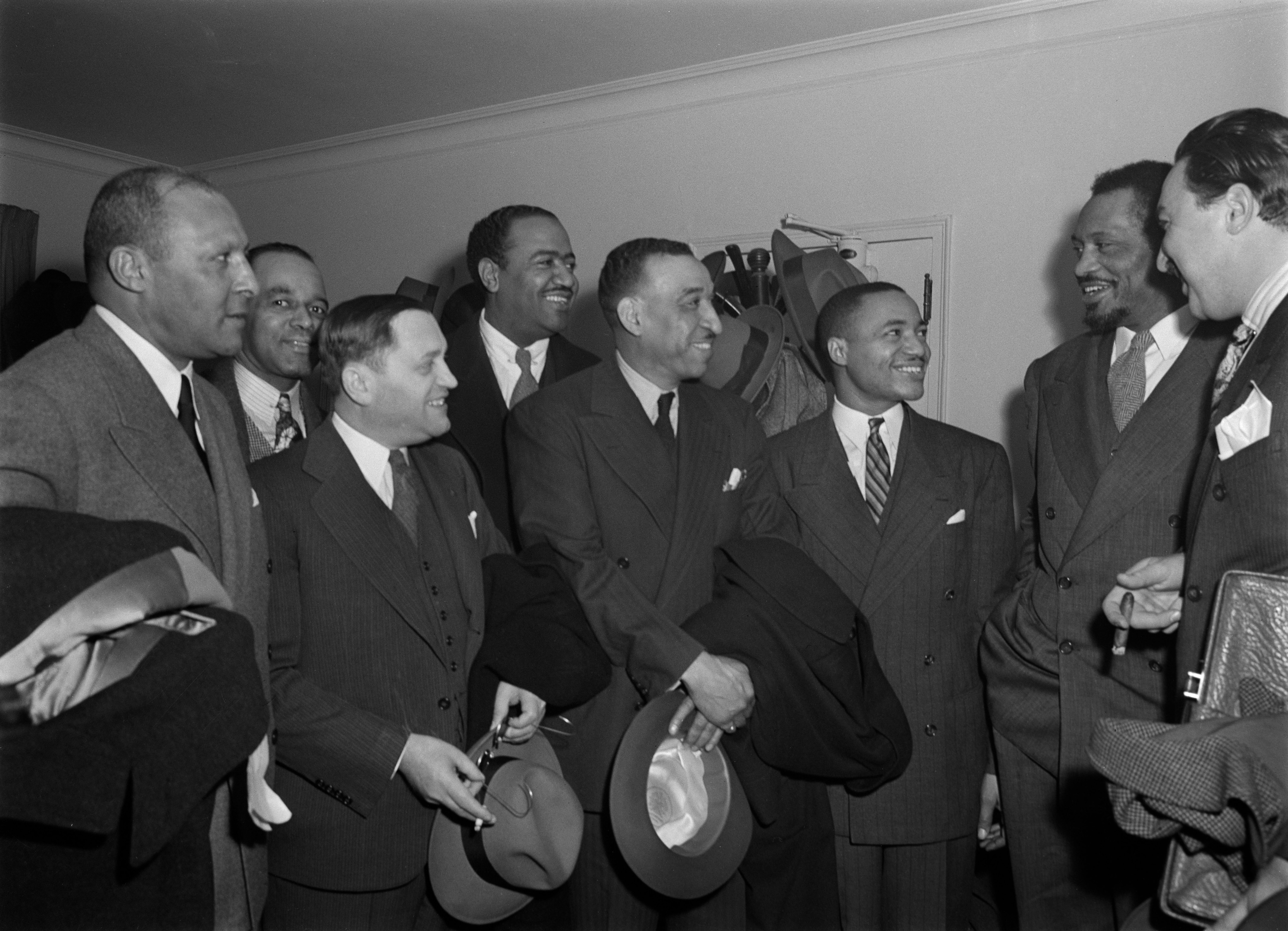
Members of an anti-color line delegation to Major League Baseball, December 3, 1943 Left to right: Max Yergan, Robert Murphy, Peter V. Cacchione, Benjamin J. Davis Jr., C. B. Powell, Ira F. Lewis, Paul Robeson, and Adam Clayton Powell Jr.

On his return to the United States, Yergan became the first African-American faculty member ever hired at one of New York City's public colleges, City College of New York, teaching the course "Negro History and Culture" in the fall of 1937. It was the first time this course was offered within the City Colleges of New York. During the Rapp-Coudert hearings, informers reported that his class was "liberal and progressive." Yergan was denied re-appointment and dismissed for his politics. In 1941, he ran for New York City Council on the American Labor Party ticket, but withdrew at the last minute and endorsed Adam Clayton Powell Jr., who won.

The Cold War led him to become disillusioned with Communism and ultimately to become strongly hostile to Communism. In 1948, Yergan was ousted as the director of Council on African Affairs following disputes with other members, causing his turn to the right. In 1952, he spoke against Communism on a visit to South Africa at the Bantu Men's Social Center in Johannesburg, noting the links between the main anti-apartheid group, the African National Congress, and the South African Communist Party. In 1955, Yergan again visited South Africa where he praised apartheid and denied that South African blacks were suffering from apartheid. The same year, he also visited the Portuguese colony of Angola, where he praised Portuguese rule as "just and efficient".

In 1961, Yergan became president of the American Committee for Aid to Katanga Freedom Fighters (ACAKFF), a conservative group that lobbied the United States to recognise Katanga. Yergan was recruited by a conservative activist Marvin Liebman who founded the ACAKFF and wanted a black man as its president to offset charges of racism given accusations by liberals and communists that Katanga was a "sham". Yergan claimed that the Congolese government had been taken over by Communists, and praised the Katangan men for wanting to "defend themselves, their wives, their children and places of work". Although a significant contingent of non-African mercenaries were deployed by Katanga, the vast majority of the Gendarmerie Katangaise were indigenous Katangese. The mercenaries were known to the Congolese as "les affreux" ("the frightful ones") on account of their brutality to blacks.

In 1962, Yergan wrote a letter to the Secretary of State, Dean Rusk, expressing his fury that the United States had denied Moïse Tshombe a visa to visit the United States while the Kennedy administration had "ceremoniously welcomed...Nikita Khrushchev, Fidel Castro, the late Patrice Lumumba, and Holden Roberto". In 1964, Yergan praised aspects of the South African governments "separate development" plan. In 1966, he became co-chairman together with William Rusher of the conservative American-African Affairs Association, which lobbied the United States to recognize the white minority government of Rhodesia. The driving force and dominant personality behind the American Committee for Aid to Katanga Freedom Fighters and the American-African Affairs Association was Liebman, and notably both groups had virtually identical letter-heads, the same mailing lists, the same boards, and the same address in New York, 79 Madison Avenue, which was also the headquarters of Marvin Liebman Associates. The public relations firm of Liebman Associates had been hired by the Rhodesian government to improve its image in the United States. In 1966, Yergan together with George Schuyler went on a trek across Rhodesia organized by Liebman and reported he had seen no evidence of any racism by the Rhodesian government towards the black majority.

== Death ==
Yergan died on April 11, 1975, in Mount Kisco, New York, at age 82. Due to his changing ideals throughout his life, he lacked all but a few close friends at the time of his death.

== Honors and awards ==
In 1933, he was awarded the Spingarn Medal from the NAACP.

His papers are held at Howard University.

== Sources ==
- David Henry Anthony, Max Yergan: Race Man, Internationalist, Cold Warrior, 2006. ISBN 0-8147-0704-1
- David Henry Anthony, "Max Yergan, Marxism and Mission during the Interwar Era in South Africa", Social Sciences and Missions (Leiden: Brill), no. 22/2, 2009, pp. 257–291.
- Josiah Brownell "Diplomatic Lepers: The Katangan and Rhodesian Foreign Missions in the United States and the Politics of Nonrecognition" pages 209-237 from The International Journal of African Historical Studies, vol. 47, no. 2, 2014.
