= Irma Dryden =

American military nurse (1920–2020)

- Born: May 28, 1920; New York City, New York
- Died: September 17, 2020 (aged 100); Canton, Georgia
- Burial place: Arlington National Cemetery
- Spouse: Charles W. Dryden
- Children: Charles a.k.a. Thumper Dryden, Keith Dryden, Eric Dryden, George Bingham, Kenneth Bingham, Tony Bingham, Cornelia-Rose White
- Military career
- Allegiance: United States of America
- Branch: United States Army Nurse Corp
- Rank: Second Lieutenant
- Nickname: "Pete"
- Conflicts: World War II

Irma Cameron Dryden (May 28, 1920 – September 17, 2020) was an American military nurse, best known for her work with the Tuskegee Airmen during WWII. She was involved in the first military wedding at Tuskegee. She went on to be the oldest living Tuskegee Aircorps nurse before her death in 2020 at the age of 100.

== Early life ==
Dryden was born in New York City in 1920. Her father was a dental technician and her mother was a school teacher. Both of Dryden's parents were Jamaican. Dryden's ambition was to become a physician, however, she decided to pursue nursing because she had difficulty accessing the necessary education. She graduated from the Harlem Hospital School of Nursing in 1942.

== Military career ==
In 1942, Dryden enlisted as a military nurse and traveled to Alabama with two of her classmates, Alice M. Dunkley and Mary Rickards. Being from New York, Dryden was shocked by the discrimination she and other black nurses faced in the segregated south. She recounted in an interview with Tuskegee University that she "didn't eat the whole trip" due to rules requiring black passengers to eat behind a curtain after white passengers had finished.

She married Tuskegee Airman Charles W. Dryden in 1943. Their wedding was the first military wedding at Tuskegee. The two would eventually divorce after 32 years of marriage but would remain friends until Charles Dryden's death in 2008.

Irma and Charles Dryden's story was mentioned in Tom Brokaw’s An Album of Memories: Personal Histories from the Greatest Generation as well as Charles Dryden's memoirs, A-Train: Memoirs of a Tuskegee Airman.

== Later life and death ==
Dryden left the military in 1944. She went on to start a medical lab in New Jersey which she oversaw for over 20 years. In 2013, she became the first honorary member of the Atlanta chapter of the National Black Nurses Association. In 2014, Dryden received a Congressional Gold Medal for her military service.

Dryden died at the age of 100 in September 2020. She was the oldest living Tuskegee Aircorps nurse at the time of her death.

== See also ==
- Executive Order 9981
- List of Tuskegee Airmen
- Military history of African Americans
- The Tuskegee Airmen (movie)
