= Goldie Brangman-Dumpson =

American nurse and educator (1917–2020)

Goldie D. Brangman-Dumpson (October 2, 1917 – February 9, 2020) was an American nurse and educator. Brangman-Dumpson was a co-founder of the school of anesthesia at Harlem Hospital, where she worked most of her career. Later, she was the director of the Harlem Hospital School of Nursing. While working at Harlem Hospital, she was part of the surgical team that worked on Martin Luther King Jr. after an attempted assassination on September 20, 1958. Brangman-Dumpson was a lifelong volunteer for the Red Cross and the first African-American president of the American Association of Nurse Anesthetists (AANA).

== Biography ==
=== Early life and education ===
Brangman-Dumpson was born on October 2, 1917 in Maryland. Brangman-Dumpson started as a volunteer for the Red Cross in 1940. Brangman attended the Harlem Hospital Center's nursing program and graduated in 1943. She went on to accept a nursing job at the Harlem Hospital. In the 1940s, she married James R. Dumpson and the couple had one child.

=== Nursing career and professional leadership ===
Brangman served as the director of the Harlem Hospital nurse anesthesia program from its founding in 1951, and is widely recognized as a co-founder of the program. In interviews about her role, Brangman spoke about the importance of this program in admitting and educating medical professionals of color and immigrants, "There weren't too many schools at the time that admitted blacks, men, or students from foreign countries." At Harlem Hospital, Brangman would also go on hold leadership position in the programs for continuing education and respiratory therapy.

Brangman-Dumpson worked at Harlem Hospital and was there when Martin Luther King Jr. was brought in after an attempted assassination on September 20, 1958. Brangman-Dumpson was a member of his surgery team on that day. She was the one who operated the breathing bag during the surgery.

In 1959, Brangman was elected president of the New York State Association of Nurse Anesthetists.

Brangman-Dumpson later became the director of the Harlem Hospital's school of anesthesia which she had co-founded. From 1973 to 1974, Brangman-Dumpson was president of the American Association of Nurse Anesthetists (AANA). She was the first African-American to hold that role at AANA.

=== Later life ===
Brangman-Dumpson moved to Hawaii in 1987 after retiring. After moving to Hawaii, she continued to volunteer with the Red Cross. In 1992, after Hurricane Omar and Hurricane Iniki, she helped work at the shelter for storm victims. In 1996, She received the Ann Magnussen Award for 67 years of service in the Red Cross.

On February 9, 2020, she died in Kailua at age 102. An award in her name is given out by the New York State Association of Nurse Anesthetists (NYSANA).

== Awards ==
Ann Magnussen Award (1996)

Agatha Hodgins Award (1995)

Helen Lamb Outstanding Educator Award (1983)

== Legacy ==
The American Association of Nurse Anesthetists established a lecture on diversity and inclusion in 2018 named in Brangman-Dumpson's honor.
