= Pamela Strobel =

- Born: Spartanburg, South Carolina. U.S.
- Other name: Princess Pamela
- Occupations: Restaurateur; Chef; Author

Pamela Strobel (born circa 1928), also known as Princess Pamela, is an American chef and cookbook author. She is best known for her authentic Southern cooking served in her New York City restaurant The Little Kitchen. Strobel also published a cookbook in 1969, Princess Pamela's Soul Food Cookbook that was featured in the Smithsonian Institution's National Museum of American History's exhibit, "Food: Transforming the American Table 1950-2000."

== Early life ==
Born in Spartanburg, South Carolina, Strobel was mainly raised by her grandmother, Addie, until she was 10 years old. Her birthname may have been Addie Mae Strobel. Strobel's mother Rosella, whose nickname was Beauty, worked as the head pastry chef at Spartanburg's Elite Restaurant. Rosella moved to Boston shortly after Strobel was born for more work and left Strobel in the care of her mother, Addie. Rosella had fallen ill and died at the age of 28 when Strobel was 10. Strobel's grandmother, Addie, died a year or two later.

After her mother and grandmother's death, Strobel traveled North and survived by doing various restaurant jobs along the way. Before making her way to New York City in 1950, Strobel worked at R. J. Reynolds tobacco plant in Winston-Salem, North Carolina, and other establishments in Virginia Beach and Newport News, Virginia.

Once in New York City, Strobel worked in a chemical factory during the day and a restaurant at night where her friend Visee Dubois danced.

== The Little Kitchen ==
In 1965, Strobel opened The Little Kitchen at 242 E 10th Street in Lower Manhattan's East Village. The soul food restaurant was around 120 square feet (11 m^{2}) and only sat around 12-15 people. The restaurant's main dish was fried chicken with collard greens and black-eyed peas for US$1.35. Strobel did not let just anyone into her restaurant. All customers had to knock before being let in by Strobel and any customer who she didn't find agreeable she'd kick out. The Little Kitchen also doubled as a jazz club and Strobel would sometimes sing.

The Little Kitchen had many famous customers, including but not limited to Lee Radziwill, Monique Van Vooren, Julius Monk, Skitch Henderson, Pearl Bailey, Tom Wolfe, Diana Ross, Gloria Steinem, and Andy Warhol.

In 1969, Strobel's book Princess Pamela's Soul Food Cookbook was published by New American Library.

Strobel is seen briefly in the background of Sheila McLaughlin’s She Must Be Seeing Things (1987) singing her own song along with percussionists, which is the only known time she was caught on film.

In 1989, Strobel moved her restaurant to East Houston Street, facing Katz’s Delicatessen and changed the name from "The Little Kitchen" to "Southern Touch."

Strobel closed Southern Touch for unknown reasons in 1998. Her whereabouts after the closure are a mystery, therefore, it's uncertain if she lived past 1998.

== Princess Pamela's Soul Food Cookbook ==
Strobel's cookbook, Princess Pamela's Soul Food Cookbook, was first published by Signet in 1969. The book has almost 150 recipes and predominantly highlights Black Southern cuisine. Strobel also wrote poems to accompany her recipes throughout the book.

After finding a vintage copy of the cookbook in 2004, Matt and Ted Lee, founders of the Lee Brothers Boiled Peanuts Catalogue, decided to republish Strobel's cookbook in 2017 with Rizzoli.
