= Malvin Russell Goode =

American pioneering television journalist (1908–1995)

Malvin Russell "Mal" Goode Sr. (February 13, 1908 – September 12, 1995) was an African-American television journalist and news correspondent.

== Education and early work ==
Goode was born in White Plains, Virginia, educated in the public school system of Homestead, Pennsylvania, and graduated from the University of Pittsburgh in 1931. Starting in high school, he was employed for twelve years as a laborer in steel mills, until five years after his graduation. Appointed to a position in the Juvenile Court as a boys work director at the Centre Avenue YMCA, he spearheaded the fight against discrimination in the Pittsburgh branches of the YMCA. Goode worked with the Pittsburgh Housing Authority for six years and joined the Pittsburgh Courier in 1948, where he remained for 14 years.

== Radio and television career ==
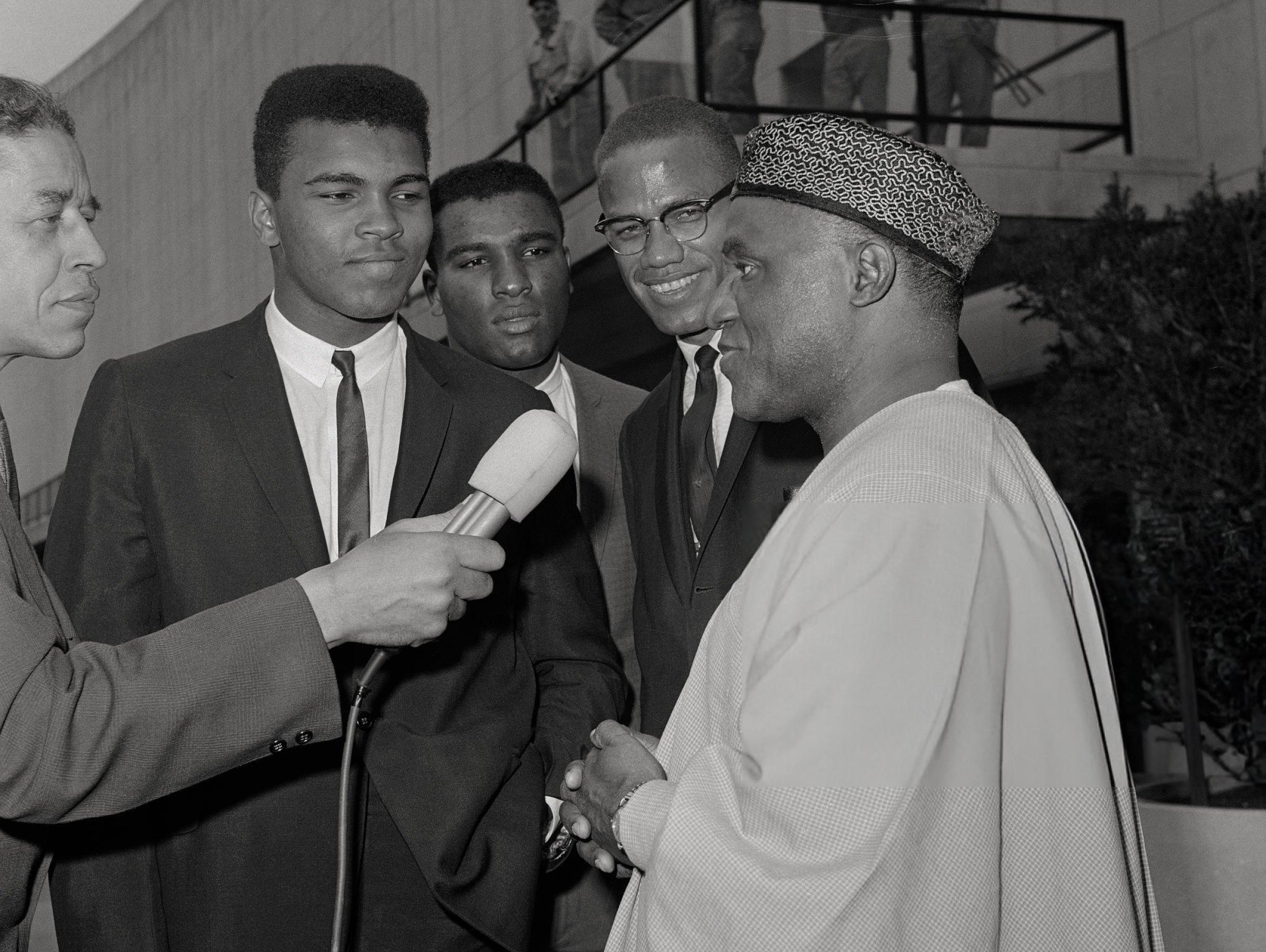
Goode with Muhammad Ali, Rahaman Ali, Malcolm X, and Simeon Adebo at the United Nations in New York City, 1964

A year later he began a career in radio broadcasting with KQV radio, doing a 15-minute news show two nights a week. Soon, he had a five-minute daily news show on WHOD, where he was named that stations news director in 1952.

In 1962 he became the first Black network news correspondent for ABC television network as a United Nations (UN) reporter. He reportedly received this position after baseball player Jackie Robinson, who was the first Black player in the major leagues, complained to ABC executives about the lack of Black reporters. Goode's first assignment was covering the Cuban Missile Crisis. He distinguished himself with incisive TV and radio reports during the long hours of debate at the UN.

For two months in 1963 he joined three of his peers to conduct courses in journalism for over 100 African students in seminars in Lagos, Nigeria; Addis Ababa, Ethiopia; and Dar es Salaam, Tanzania.

Goode was a member of Alpha Phi Alpha fraternity, and in April 1968 covered the assassination of Martin Luther King Jr., a fellow fraternity brother

in 1971, Goode became the first Black member of the Radio-Television News Directors Association.

In 1990, the National Association of Black Journalists inducted Mr. Goode into its hall of fame.

Malvin Goode died of a stroke on September 12, 1995, at the age of 87 in Pittsburgh.

In 1996 the T. Thomas Fortune Lifetime Achievement Award was conferred posthumously on Malvin R Goode, sponsored by Garden State Association of Black Journalists chapter of the National Association of Black Journalists, funded by Miller Brewing Company and Philip Morris Inc.

In 2024 a biography by Liann Tsoukas and Rob Ruck entitled Mal Good Reporting was published by University of Pittsburgh Press.
