= WAOB (AM) =

Coordinates: 40°29′27″N 79°58′55″W

Millvale, Pennsylvania; United States
- Broadcast area: Pittsburgh metropolitan area
- Frequency: 860 kHz

Programming
- Format: Catholic talk and teaching

Ownership
- Owner: St. Joseph Ministries

History
- First air date: 1948 (as WHOD–Homestead, Pennsylvania)
- Call sign meaning: We Are One Body

Technical information
- Licensing authority: FCC
- Facility ID: 60155
- Class: B
- Power: 1,000 watts (Daytime); 830 watts (Nighttime)

Links
- Public license information: Public file; LMS
- Webcast: Listen live
- Website: www.waob.org

WAOB (860 kHz) is an AM radio station licensed to Millvale, Pennsylvania that broadcasts to the Greater Pittsburgh region. Operating for fifty years as WAMO (AM 660), it served Pittsburgh's African-American community until 2009. The station was sold to St. Joseph Ministries and carries a Catholic talk and teaching radio format. The studios and offices are located in Latrobe, Pennsylvania.

By day, WAOB transmits with 1,000 watts, but because 860 AM is a clear channel frequency reserved for Class A CJBC Toronto, WAOB must reduce power at night to 830 watts to avoid interference. It uses a directional antenna at all times. Programming is simulcast on 106.7 WAOB-FM in Beaver Falls, Pennsylvania, and WPGR 1510 AM in Monroeville, Pennsylvania.

== History ==
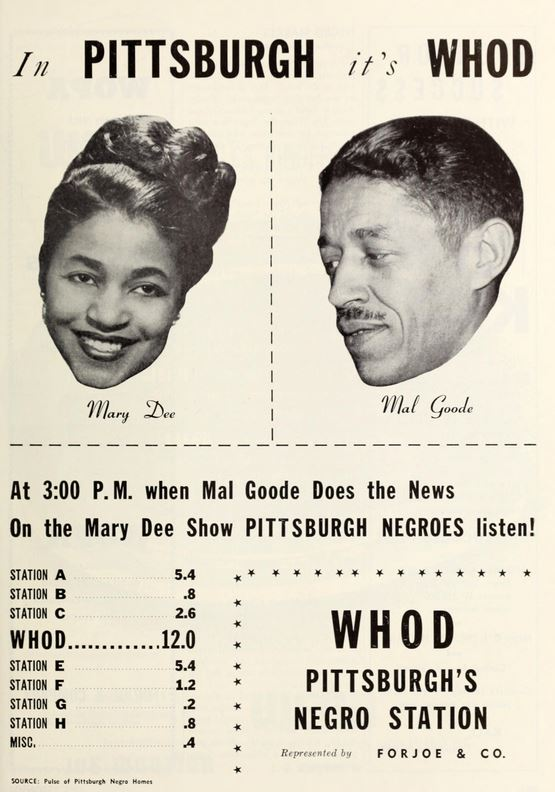
WHOD advertisement for Movin' Around with Mary Dee, which featured Mary Dee and her brother Mal Goode, on the air from 1948-1956

In 1948, the station signed on as WHOD, and was licensed to Homestead, Pennsylvania. It was originally owned by Steel City Broadcasting, Inc. (using Pittsburgh's nickname).

Powered at only 250 watts, it was a daytimer station that was required to go off the air at night.

It changed its call sign to WAMO in 1956 (the AMO referred to the Allegheny, Monongahela and Ohio rivers), and switched its city of license to Pittsburgh.

WAMO served the area's African-American community for the following fifty years, playing R&B and soul music, with some Black talk and news programming during the week and religious programming on Sundays. During the 1950s, WAMO disc jockey Craig "Porky" Chedwick began airing a variety of what then came to be known as "the first oldies." Scouring record bins and antique stores for lost R&B recordings, he built up a library of records, creating what came to be later known as "Pittsburgh's Oldies," using a style that was later imitated by other DJs in Pittsburgh and across the country. Many credit Chedwick with being the father of "Oldies" radio.

In 1960, the station added an FM simulcast on 105.9 WAMO-FM (later WXDX-FM). Over time, WAMO-FM became an urban contemporary station while WAMO 860 specialized in Black news, talk, classic soul music and urban gospel. During the 1990s, its signal was upgraded, and its city of license was changed from Pittsburgh to Millvale. For a time during this period, the station alternated between the callsigns WYJZ and WAMO.

On January 31, 2006, WAMO signed a deal with Radio One to pick up its Urban Talk line up of hosts. The change took place on February 27, 2006. This format did not last long, and, on August 28, 2006, the station returned to playing music it described as "R&B and classic soul," retaining the syndicated Steve Harvey and Bev Smith programs in mornings and late-nights, respectively.

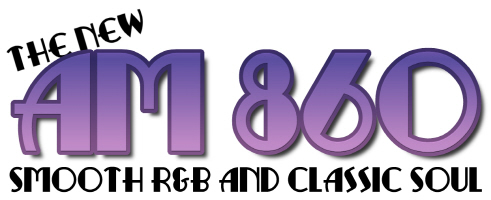
Final logo for WAMO-AM, used until 2009.

On May 15, 2009, Sheridan announced the sale of WAMO-AM, WAMO-FM and WPGR-AM to St. Joseph Missions. On September 8, 2009, WAMO-AM and its FM sister station signed off the air, ending a sixty-one-year legacy of serving Pittsburgh's African-American community. The call letters were changed to WAOB and the station returned to the air in February 2010, as a non-commercial religious outlet.

Another AM station in the Pittsburgh radio market, on 660 AM in Wilkinsburg, Pennsylvania, picked up the callsign WAMO and carries urban contemporary programming on its AM frequency as well as an FM translator at 107.3 MHz.
