= Alliance for Women in Media =

US organization to support women in the media

The Alliance for Women in Media (AWM) is a nonprofit organization created by women in 1951 that works to support women in the media in the United States.

== About ==
The mission of the organization is to "advance the impact of women in broadcasting and related fields." Its members support educational programs, offer scholarships, do charity work and other public service activities for women who are pursuing careers in media. AWM also presents the Gracie Award to honor women's accomplishments in all media, especially for programming created by and for women. AWM is a national organization, with affiliates in different regions of the country, where both women and men are welcome to join.

AWM hosts the annual "Women Who Lead" luncheon. In 2016, AWM Chair Kristen Welch said, "Women Who Lead is one way AWM recognizes and connects women who serve in all areas of the media and entertainment industry. By honoring these outstanding women we are empowering all women, at every level, to take that next step in elevating their careers and their contributions."

== History ==
The organization was founded in 1951 when the National Association of Broadcasters (NAB) dissolved its women's division, known as the Association of Women Directors (AWD). After the dissolution, more than 280 women came together to create American Women in Radio and Television (AWRT).

From 1951 to 1967, the AWRT partnered with McCall's magazine to present the Golden Mike Award for Women in Radio and Television. Winners of the Golden Mike included Lillian Brown, Genie Chance, Helen Duhamel, Pauline Frederick, Lucy Jarvis, Ruth Lyons, Agnes Moorehead, Helen Reichert, Marlene Sanders, Betty Lou Varnum, Alma Vessells John, and Judith C. Waller.

The AWRT educational foundation was founded in 1960. The foundation awards scholarships of $20,000 to students to start their careers in the media industry.

The sequel to the Golden Mike Awards, the Gracie Awards, were established in 1975 to acknowledge women who help to create positive differences and who continue to develop the idea of what an amazing career in the media is like. Recipients of the foundation scholarships are invited to the Gracie Awards luncheon in New York City to be recognized, and to accept their scholarship. The foundation partners with other organizations to provide additional scholarships to students.

The organization changed its name in 2010 to the Alliance for Women in Media. This coincided with a change in organization's membership structure which reduced or eliminated dues for most members.

== Awards ==
The 2017 honors for "Women Who Lead" went to:

- Caroline Beasley, CEO, Beasley Broadcast Group
- Amy Emmerich, Chief Content Officer, Refinery29
- Kathleen Finch, Chief Programming, Content & Brand Officer, Scripps Networks
- Susan Swain, co-CEO, C-SPAN
- Julie Talbott, President, Premiere Networks

== See also ==
- European Women's Lobby
