= WAOB-FM =

Coordinates: 40.6198°N 80.0931°W

- Beaver Falls, Pennsylvania; United States
- Broadcast area: Pittsburgh metropolitan area
- Frequency: 106.7 MHz (HD Radio)
- Branding: 106.7 WAOB

Programming
- Format: Religious (Catholic)

Ownership
- Owner: St. Joseph Missions
- Sister stations: WAOB, WPGR

History
- First air date: May 1960
- Former call signs: WWKS (1960–1995); WXDX (1995–1996); WAMO-FM (1996–2009)
- Call sign meaning: We Are One Body

Technical information
- Licensing authority: FCC
- Facility ID: 52747
- Class: B
- ERP: 37,000 watts
- HAAT: 169 meters (554 ft)

Links
- Public license information: Public file; LMS
- Webcast: Listen live
- Website: waob.org

WAOB-FM (106.7 FM) is a non-commercial radio station licensed to Beaver Falls, Pennsylvania, United States. Serving the Pittsburgh metropolitan area, as well as parts of Eastern Ohio and the northern panhandle of West Virginia, it is owned by St. Joseph Missions and it simulcasts a Catholic format with WAOB and WPGR. WAOB-FM's transmitter is sited on VIP Drive near Interstate 79 in Wexford, Pennsylvania. The radio studios and offices are located in Latrobe, Pennsylvania.

Previously, 1996 to 2009, 106.7 FM was legendary Urban Contemporary/R&B station WAMO-FM.

== History ==
WAOB-FM on a SPARC HD Radio with RDS.

106.7 FM signed on in May 1960 as WWKS. For much of the 1960s and 1970s, it was an automated beautiful music and easy listening station known as "Kiss FM."

During the 1980s, as easy listening music saw its audience aging, management decided to go in another direction. The station flipped to classic rock. By November 1993, 106.7 FM was known as "The Force" with an album rock format.

The Force touted itself with the motto "The Best of Rock." The station flipped to modern rock in 1995 as "106-7 The X", WXDX. The station became the Pittsburgh affiliate for Howard Stern, beginning that November.

On April 10, 1996, at 3 p.m., WXDX swapped frequencies with WAMO-FM, an urban contemporary radio station. That resulted in WAMO-FM moving from the 105.9 frequency. This came after Clear Channel Communications, the owner of WXDX, paid Sheridan Broadcasting (WAMO's owners), to swap frequencies, wanting better full-market coverage. Sheridan was also running into financial difficulties during this time, agreeing to the frequency swap to keep the station in the black.

The swap resulted in WAMO-FM moving to the 106.7 frequency, with limited coverage in Pittsburgh's southern suburbs. To make up for the loss of coverage, WAMO-FM was also simulcast with WSSZ to cover part of the metropolitan area, beginning that same year. In 2004, WAMO-FM relocated its transmitter, resulting in better coverage. At the same time, WSSZ broke from the simulcast and shifted to Urban Adult Contemporary and became WJJJ-FM, "Majic 107.1." In 2004, the station changed its longtime on-air brand from Hot 106, WAMO to 106.7 WAMO, Pittsburgh's #1 for Hip Hop & R&B.

One of the station's former logos

On May 15, 2009, Sheridan announced that it had sold WAMO, WAMO-FM and WPGR AM to St. Joseph Missions for $8.9 million. The deal was approved by the Federal Communications Commission, and the stations were to change to a Catholic religious format by February 2010. All 35 WAMO employees were laid off or fired after the sale closed, leaving Pittsburgh without an Urban formatted outlet. The callsign was changed to WAOB upon the transfer of ownership.

The news of this sale attracted a lot of attention, and the reaction from listeners. African-American radio listeners were left with no options in the Pittsburgh radio market; however, due to the high ratings WAMO-FM had with its Urban format, it was assumed another station in Pittsburgh would switch to Urban Contemporary to take advantage of the newly available audience. Some had hoped that WOGI would pick up the Urban format. Instead, Keymarket sold the station to Educational Media Foundation, which replaced WOGI's Country music format with its "K-LOVE" Christian contemporary network.

At 6:07 p.m. on September 8, 2009, WAMO-FM discontinued broadcasting. Its last song was Boyz II Men's It's So Hard to Say Goodbye to Yesterday, which was followed by silence. Since then, other outlets began adding some form of Urban or R&B programming, as AC outlet WLTJ launched a nighttime Adult R&B program called "Q after Dark" aimed at a 25-54 audience in the same month.

In addition, the Hip Hop music and R&B titles playlist was increased on Clear Channel Communications's WKST-FM (96.1 Kiss FM), a Top 40 station.

In October 2009, Eddie Edwards, the one-time owner of then independent television outlet WPTT, announced that he was acquiring AM outlet WPYT, a station with good daytime coverage but not so good coverage at night. Edwards hoped that he could fill the Urban void with this new outlet (in actuality the format would be Urban Talk, targeting African-Americans aged 25 to 54 in the Pittsburgh metro), which pending FCC approval, would have started in February 2010. On November 3, 2009, however, it was announced that those plans had fallen through after his son, Eddie Edwards Jr., confirmed that the senior Edwards withdrew the application due to health problems.

On May 22, 2011, Martz Communications debuted the new WAMO on 660 AM and 100.1 FM, which is a translator with the callsign W261AX. It is licensed to Wilkinsburg, Pennsylvania.

106.7 FM returned to the air on February 15, 2010, with a live broadcast of a Catholic Mass. After its conclusion, the station announced that WAOB would begin regular programming on March 19, with only Mass broadcasts being carried in the interim.

In March 2010, under new ownership, WAOB radio became known as WAOB "We Are One Body" FM Radio. It now operates as an official Catholic media outlet from its headquarters in Latrobe, Pennsylvania. According to its website waob.org:

"We Are One Body (WAOB) produces catechetical and contemplative programming. The programming is intended to present the life of the Church in a way that makes the Mystical Body of Christ more apparent: the Pope and bishops united with their priests, in their role as head, working together with the laity in their role as members. The catechetical programming consists of magisterial teaching from the Pope and bishops followed by conversations between priests who explain and elaborate on the magisterial teaching. The We Are One Body programming also contains broadcasts of lectio divina, led by priests, on Scripture, the writings of the saints, and the Catechism of the Catholic Church; leading listeners to interior silence and contemplation through meditation and prayer. The programming described above is supported by broadcasts of prayer from parishes, families and religious orders, including the Holy Mass and the Liturgy of the Hours, and devotions such as the Rosary and Divine Mercy Chaplet."
