= Harlem Hospital Center =

- NYC Health + Hospitals

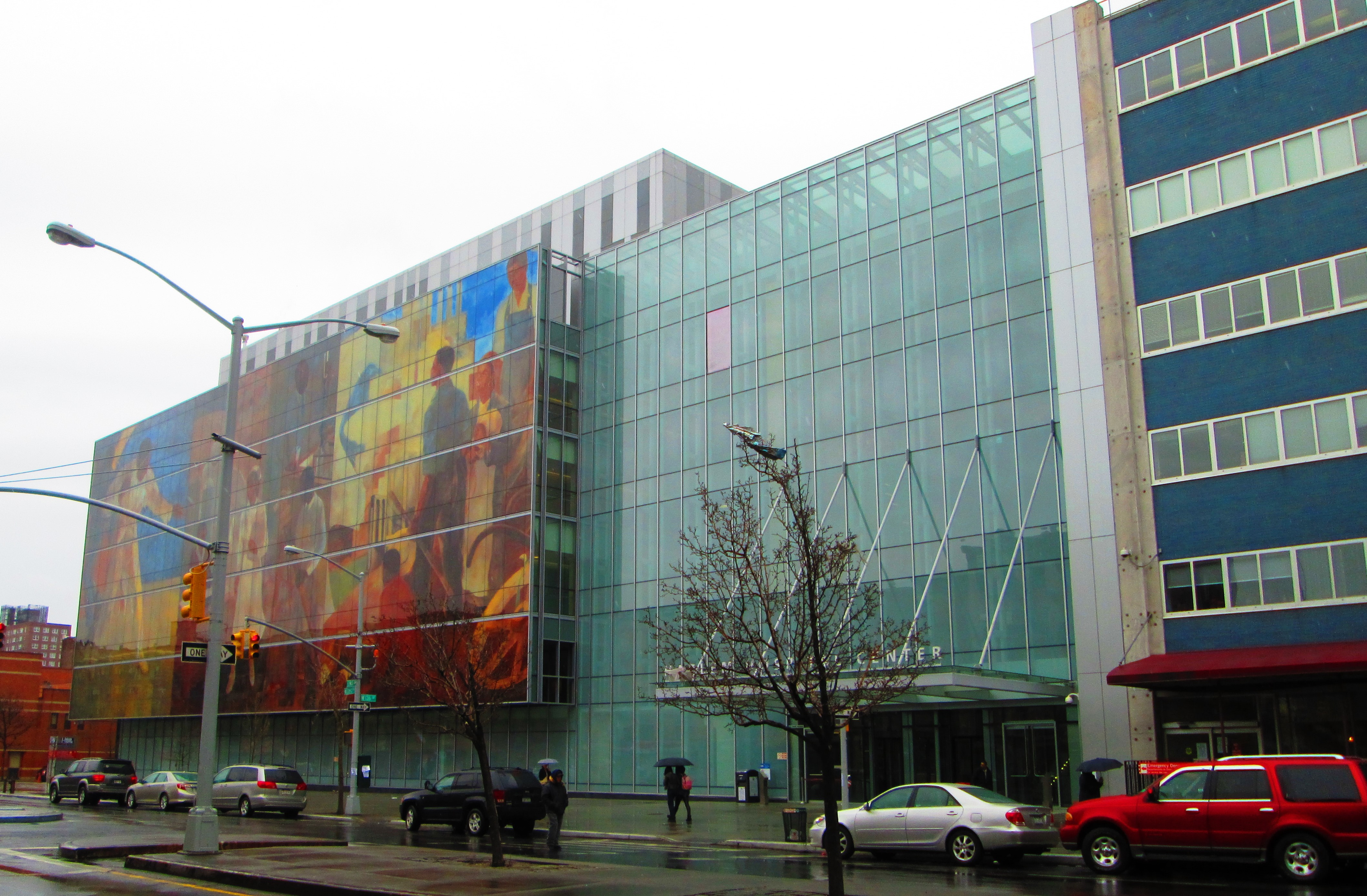
- The hospital's Lenox Avenue facade

Geography
- Location: 506 Lenox Avenue, New York, New York, United States
- Coordinates: 40.814232°N 73.940189°W

Organization
- Care system: Private
- Type: Teaching
- Affiliated university: Columbia Medical Center; College of Physicians and Surgeons; New York College of Podiatric Medicine
- Network: NYC Health + Hospitals

Services
- Emergency department: Level II Trauma Center / Level II Pediatric Trauma Center
- Beds: 282
- Speciality: Asthma, Burns, Reconstructive surgery, Tuberculosis

History
- Founded: April 18, 1897; 129 years ago

Links
- Website: nychhc.org/harlem
- Lists: Hospitals in New York State
- Other links: Hospitals in Manhattan

Harlem Hospital Center, branded as NYC Health + Hospitals/Harlem, is a 282-bed, public teaching hospital affiliated with Columbia University. It is located at 506 Lenox Avenue in Harlem, Manhattan, New York City and was founded on April 18, 1887.

The hospital was established to provide healthcare to the citizens of the neighborhood. Initially, the hospital served as a holding area for patients to be transferred to Randalls and Wards Islands and Bellevue Hospital. After World War I, the hospital soon outgrew its initial building. After acquiring land, a new building opened on April 13, 1907. The hospital developed a teaching program that is affiliated with Columbia University, and has continued to serve the Harlem neighborhood since its inception.

== Administration ==
Administratively, Harlem Hospital Center is a member of the NYC Health + Hospitals. It is designated as a Level II Trauma Center and a burn center that includes a specialty in plastic and reconstructive surgery to reduce the scarring unique to the African-American community. It is also designated as a Heart Care Station by the American Heart Association and participates in the 911 Receiving Hospitals Advisory Committee. It has been affiliated with the College of Physicians and Surgeons at Columbia University since 1962.

The Harlem Hospital Center has engaged in many innovative programs specialized for its inner-city location, such as one of the few specialized asthma centers. While four percent of the national population has asthma, that figure approaches 20 percent in Harlem. It has a referral Center for Tuberculosis, the Charles P. Felton National Tuberculosis Center, that served as a premier Model for TB control nationwide.

Harlem Hospital Center provides over 210,000 clinical visits, 83,000 emergency department visits, and 13,000 inpatient admissions each year. It also operates Harlem Hospital School of Nursing and a Physician assistant program.

May Edward Chinn, the first African-American woman to graduate from Bellevue Hospital Medical College, was also the first African-American woman to intern at Harlem Hospital. Lucille C. Gunning, an African-American pediatrician and specialist in the treatment of children's cancer, who was known for her treatment of patients with Sickle cell disease, was the director of pediatric rehabilitation at Harlem Hospital during the 1980s.

== History ==
Harlem Hospital was opened April 18, 1897 in a three-story building that housed 54 beds. The hospital was originally served as a center for patients waiting to be transferred to Bellevue Hospital. Harlem Hospital was founded under the control of the Department of Public Charities and Corrections. The hospital's initial 54 beds proved to be lacking, especially after the wave of African Americans who traveled to New York after World War I. The Harlem Hospital served as a sense of pride for the African-American community. As the African-American community started to grow in New York, they attempted to gain control over aspects of the community that had a direct impact on them. City bureaucracies, such as the police force and firefighters, were dominated by outside communities. Understandably, African Americans had a tough time getting these positions and advancing in the ranks of society. After many obstacles, African Americans were able to work as physicians in the 1930s. The hospital soon became a fixture in the community.

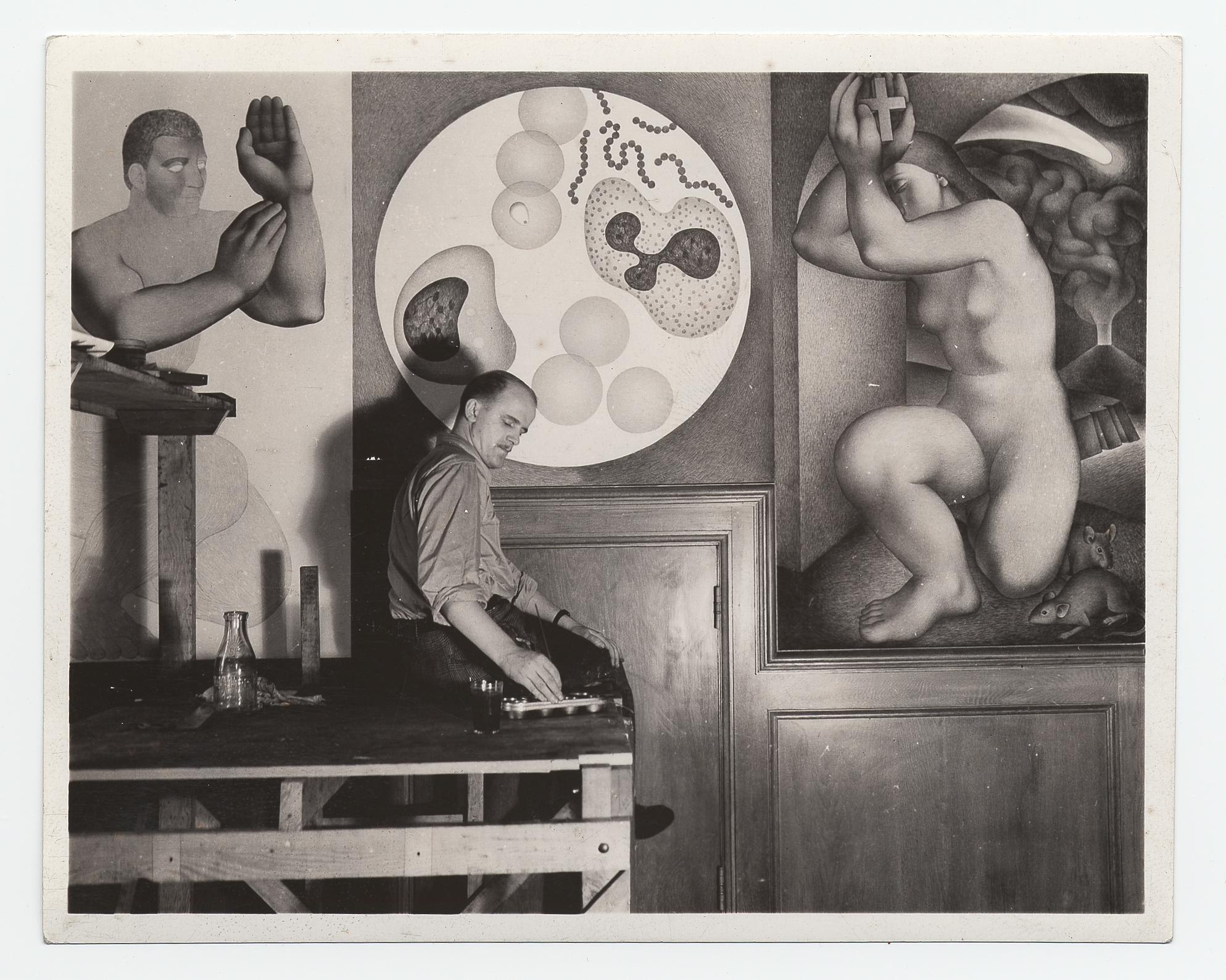
Eric Mose painting a mural at Harlem Hospital (October 1936)

=== Hardships ===
Harlem Hospital has also faced hardships, particularly with integrating its staff, upholding healthcare standards, and economically. When first established, Harlem Hospital was staffed by white physicians and through the mistreatment of Black patients, a movement began to integrate the hospital. Since the 1980s, New York City had been monitoring Harlem Hospital to ensure that the employees complied with Medicare conditions of participation.

In the 1990s, the hospital faced trying economic times. Mayor Rudy Giuliani and his administration had hard decisions to make concerning the hospital. Due to lack of income and profit, the Giuliani administration wrestled with the idea of laying off hospital employees. Lack of patients, insurance money, and government support led to what seemed like the demise of the hospital. The community, however, was not satisfied with the city's response to lay off employees. Because the hospital was a staple in the community, Harlem residents feared not having a place to go to for reliable healthcare. To citizens, the layoffs were the first step in removing quality healthcare from poorer neighborhoods. To make sure their voices were heard, the Harlem community took to the streets to make sure their support of the hospital was heard by all. The support did not come without criticism. Harlem citizens feared the condition of the hospital, and wanted to ensure that all measures were put into place to maintain the community's monument for healthcare.

=== Achievements ===
Harlem Hospital has received numerous awards. In 2000, the hospital received the Healthcare Association of New York State Community Health Improvement Award, given in honor of the hospital's Injury Prevention Program. The injury center at the hospital was recognized for targeting window falls, violent injuries, and bicycle injuries.

The hospital has also been recognized for critical operations and notable physicians. In 1958, Martin Luther King Jr., survived an emergency thoracotomy at Harlem Hospital following his near-fatal stabbing, an event referenced in his final public address, "I Have Been to the Mountaintop". Goldie Brangman, a CRNA who worked at the hospital, recounted the evening in 2015. Though the operation was indeed notable, as it saved a prominent civil rights leader, Goldie Brangman also deserves recognition. While serving the hospital for 45 years, Brangman directed its nurse anesthesia education program. Brangman also became the first black president of the American Association of Nurse Anesthetists. Brangman's achievements were unheard of during such a hostile time of race relations.

== Current conditions ==
Harlem Hospital currently has six residency programs under an affiliation with Columbia University College of Physicians and Surgeons. The hospital has been affiliated with Columbia University since 1962. The six residency programs include: Internal Medicine, Pediatrics, Psychiatry, Radiology, Surgery, Dentistry, and Oral and Maxillofacial Surgery The residency programs allows hands-on teaching for those who are interested in various medical fields. There are currently 202 resident and fellow positions at the hospital.

In 2013, the demographics of the hospital admissions were 1,462 Hispanics, 9,239 Blacks, 445 whites, 48 Asians, 1,924 others and 9 unknowns.

== Art work ==
The hospital owns a set of Works Progress Administration murals, painted by artists including Charles Alston, Alfred Crimi, Georgette Seabrooke, Elba Lightfoot, and Vertis Hayes. In addition, a sculpture by John Rhoden, "Untitled (Family)", adorns some of the entrances.

== See also ==
- Harlem Hospital School of Nursing
