= James T. Goodrich =

American neurosurgeon (1946–2020)

- Born: James Tait Goodrich; April 16, 1946; Portland, Oregon, U.S.
- Died: March 30, 2020 (aged 73); New York City, New York, U.S.
- Occupation: Neurosurgeon
- Known for: 2004 and 2016 separation of conjoined twins
- Spouse: Judy Loudin (m. 1970)

James Tait Goodrich (April 16, 1946 – March 30, 2020) was an American neurosurgeon. He was the director of the Division of Pediatric Neurosurgery at Montefiore Health System and Professor of Clinical Neurological Surgery, Pediatrics, Plastic and Reconstructive Surgery at the Albert Einstein College of Medicine, and gained worldwide recognition for performing multiple successful separations of conjoined twins. He assisted in two craniopagus separations with Dr. Alferayan A in Riyadh, Saudi Arabia, with the first one done May 5, 2014 (Rana and Raneem) and the second one done February 14, 2016 (Tuga and Yageen). Both pairs were successfully separated and are doing well.

== Background ==
Goodrich was born in Portland, Oregon, the son of Gail (Josselyn), an artist and designer, and Richard Goodrich, who worked in advertising. He received his undergraduate degree from the University of California, Irvine in 1974. He received his master's degree in 1978 and PhD in 1980 from Columbia University. He later returned to Columbia University to earn an MD. He did his medical residency at New York–Presbyterian Hospital. He served in the United States Marine Corps during the Vietnam War.

== Career ==
Goodrich was a professor of medicine at the Albert Einstein College of Medicine from 1998 until the time of his death.

Goodrich was best known for his 2004 and 2016 separations of craniopagus conjoined twins, those that share brain tissue and who are at a high risk of death unless separated before the age of 2. Goodrich developed a multi-stage approach to separate such twins, of which he did seven times during his tenure and of which 59 total had been performed in the world as of March 2020. Goodrich stated that such surgery does come with a cost as it is generally impossible to avoid some damage to one of the twin's brains, depending on how much brain material his shared, but had tried to minimize this impact through his process.

Goodrich's first such operation was in 2004 on Carl and Clarence Aguirre. After months of planning, Goodrich led a team of 16 doctors during a 17-hour surgery to separate the twins in 2004. Both twins survived though undertook rehabilitation throughout their youth. Both twins were healthy as of March 2020, but Carl remains mentally underdeveloped behind Clarence. Goodrich led a similar 27-hour surgery with a team of 40 doctors on Jadon and Anias McDonald when they were 13 months old in 2016, and as of January 2019, both twins were still in rehabilitation, with Anias considered a few months behind Jadon, but recovering.

Goodrich was also an historian of medicine, and distinguished collector of antiquarian medical and scientific books. In 1982, he was elected a member of the American Osler Society, an organization of physicians and historians devoted to the celebration of the extraordinary humanistic, scientific, and bibliophilic achievements of Sir William Osler, one of the founding members of Johns Hopkins University.

== Awards and recognition ==
Goodrich was named to Best Doctors in America and was listed in the Guide to America's Top Surgeons by the Consumers Council of America and New York magazine. He received the New York City Mayors Award in Science and Technology. He also received the Bronze Medal from the Alumni Association of the College of Physicians and Surgeons. He has also received awards including the Mead-Johnson Award, the Roche Laboratories Award in Neuroscience and the Sir William Osler Medal from the American Association for the History of Medicine in 1978. In 2018, he was awarded a Marquis Who's Who Lifetime Achievement Award.

== Death ==
Goodrich died in New York on March 30, 2020, of complications from coronavirus disease 2019 (COVID-19). He is survived by his wife, Judy Loudin, and three sisters.
