= Xiao P. Peng =

Chinese-American physician-scientist

- Born: China
- Education: California Institute of Technology; Weill Cornell Medical College; Sloan Kettering Institute
- Scientific career
- Fields: Medical genetics; Clinical immunology; Pediatrics
- Workplaces: Children's Hospital at Montefiore; Johns Hopkins University (former); University of Freiburg (former)
- Thesis: Studies on the Smc5/6 complex (2015)
- Doctoral advisor: Xiaolan Zhao

Xiao P. Peng is a Chinese-American physician-scientist and clinical geneticist specializing in inborn errors of immunity (IEIs) and genetically-driven blood and immune disorders. She is Director of the Genetics of Blood and Immunity Clinic and Director of the Advanced Diagnostics Program at the New York Center for Rare Diseases at the Children's Hospital at Montefiore, and Assistant Professor of Pediatrics and Genetics at Albert Einstein College of Medicine.

Peng is known for her contributions to understanding the genetic basis of immune disorders and for co-developing GenIA (Genetic Immunology Advisor), a comprehensive public database linking genotype-phenotype information for inborn errors of immunity.

== Education ==
Peng received her Bachelor of Science degree with honors in Chemistry from the California Institute of Technology in 2005, where she was awarded the Axline Merit Scholarship. After working as a research technician at the Broad Institute of Harvard and MIT from 2005 to 2007, she entered the Weill Cornell/Rockefeller/Sloan-Kettering Tri-Institutional MD-PhD Program.

In 2015, Peng completed her PhD in Biochemistry, Cellular and Molecular Biology at Sloan Kettering Institute under the supervision of Xiaolan Zhao, studying the Smc5/6 protein complex and its role in DNA replication and genome stability. She received her medical degree from Weill Cornell Medical College in 2017. She completed her combined Pediatrics-Medical Genetics residency at Johns Hopkins University from 2017 to 2021, followed by a year as Chief Resident and Research Fellow in the Department of Genetic Medicine (2021–2022).

== Career ==
Peng is board certified by the American Board of Medical Genetics and Genomics in Clinical Genetics and Genomics (2021) and by the American Board of Pediatrics in General Pediatrics (2021). She is licensed to practice medicine in New York and Maryland.

From 2022 to 2024, Peng was as Assistant Professor in the Department of Genetic Medicine at Johns Hopkins University, where she directed the Genetics of Blood and Immunity Clinic and served as Clinical Advisor for Johns Hopkins Genomics DNA Diagnostics Lab. During this time, she also held a position as geneticist at the Center for Chronic Immunodeficiency (CCI) at the University of Freiburg, Germany (2020–2023).

In October 2024, Peng joined the Children's Hospital at Montefiore as Assistant Professor of Pediatrics and Genetics, Director of the Genetics of Blood and Immunity Service, and Director of Advanced Diagnostics for the New York Center for Rare Diseases.

== Research ==
Peng has made contributions to understanding the genetic basis of primary immunodeficiencies. She has contributed to multi-institutional collaborations that identified patients with novel genetically-driven diseases ARPC5 deficiency, AIOLOS-associated disease, and ADA2 deficiency.

In collaboration with colleagues at the University of Freiburg and Medizinische Hochschule Hannover, Peng co-developed GenIA (Genetic Immunology Advisor), a comprehensive public database designed to assist clinicians and researchers in diagnosing and managing inborn errors of immunity. The database integrates genotype-phenotype information with diagnostic and management recommendations, addressing a critical need in the field of clinical immunology. Peng serves as Co-Lead of the GenIA project and continues to advance the platform by integrating AI-based strategies with expert curation to dynamically update information on emerging gene-disease relationships.

Since 2018, Peng has led multiple research projects focused on ataxia-telangiectasia (A-T) in collaboration with the A-T Clinic at Johns Hopkins Hospital. Her work includes creation and curation of a comprehensive ATM genotype-phenotype database for machine learning-based discovery of clinical course markers and characterization of cancer prevalence and treatment-associated toxicities in A-T patients. Her A-T research is supported by grants from the A-T Children's Project, the Department of Health and Human Services, and Lyda Hill Philanthropies.

Peng leads the design, implementation and application of novel genomic approaches to help patients with suspected genetically-driven disease achieve molecular diagnosis after standard clinical methods have failed.

== Publications ==
Peng has authored over 40 peer-reviewed publications, including reviews on common variable immunodeficiency and the Smc5/6 complex.

Peng is a reviewer for Genetics in Medicine, Clinical Immunology, Frontiers in Immunology, Journal of Clinical Immunology, and Journal of Human Immunology.

== Awards and honors ==
- 2001–2005: Caltech Axline Merit Scholarship
- 2011–2013: Paul & Daisy Soros Fellowship for New Americans
- 2017: Weill Cornell International Health Grant in Infectious Disease/Tropical and Travel Medicine
- 2017: Jay Lawrence Award for Clinical Proficiency in Infectious Diseases
- 2020: Margaret Nielsen Fellowship in Genetic Medicine, JHUSOM Institute of Genetic Medicine
- 2022: JHUSOM Physician Scientist Training Program Microgrant Award

== Selected publications ==
=== Major reviews ===
- Peng XP, Zhao XL. "The multi-functional Smc5/6 complex in genome protection and diseases." Nature Structural & Molecular Biology. 2023;30(6):724–734.
- Peng XP, Caballero-Oteyza A, Grimbacher B. "Common Variable Immunodeficiency: More Pathways than Roads to Rome." Annual Review of Pathology. 2023;18:283–310.
- Caballero-Oteyza A, Di Biase M, Peng XP. Molecular diagnostics 101: how to use genetic tests in classical hematology. Hematology Am Soc Hematol Educ Program. 2025 Dec 5;2025(1):359–369. doi: 10.1182/hematology.2025000725
- Rivière JG, Saba RC, Carot-Sans G, Piera-Jiménez J, Butte MJ, Soler-Palacín P, Peng XP. Current perspectives and challenges of using AI in immunodeficiencies. J Allergy Clin Immunol. 2025. Jun 28:S0091-6749(25)00691-8. doi: 10.1016/j.jaci.2025.06.015.
- Peng XP, Wilson JL, Bogunovic D. "The Unique Landscape of Genetically-Driven Blood and Immune Diseases: Paradigms and Challenges." NEJM Evidence. Under review.

=== Original research ===
- Caballero-Oteyza A*, Crisponi L*, Peng XP*, et al. "GenIA, the Genetic Immunology Advisor database for Inborn Errors of Immunity." Journal of Allergy and Clinical Immunology. 2023. (*equal contribution)
- Peng XP, Lim S, Li S, et al. "Acute Smc5/6 depletion reveals its primary role in rDNA replication by restraining recombination at fork pausing sites." PLoS Genetics. 2018;14(1):e1007129.
- Peng XP, Al-Ddafari MS, Caballero-Oteyza A, El Mezouar C, Mrovecova P, Dib SE, Massen Z, Smahi MC, Faiza A, Hassaïne RT, Lefranc G, Aribi M, Grimbacher B. Next generation sequencing (NGS)-based approach to diagnosing Algerian patients with suspected inborn errors of immunity (IEIs). Clin Immunol. 2023 Sep 9;256:109758. doi: 10.1016/j.clim.2023.109758.
- Magnarelli A, Liu Q, Wang F, Peng X, Wright J, Natale V, Rothblum-Oviatt C, Lefton-Greif MA, Mcgrath-morrow S, Crawford TO, Ehrhardt MJ, Lederman HL, Sharma R. Prevalence and outcomes of cancer and treatment-associated toxicities for patients with Ataxia Telangiectasia. J Allergy Clin Immun. 2024 Nov 8:S0091-6749(24)01167-9. doi: 10.1016/j.jaci.2024.10.023.
- Weinstock NI, Applegate C, Peng L, Keates-Baleeiro J, Gamper C, Peng XP. NHEJ1 Splice Variants Associated with Bone Marrow Failure and Hematologic Malignancy. Pediatr Blood Cancer. 2025 Jun 28:e31884. doi: 10.1002/pbc.31884.

=== Book chapters ===
- Peng XP, Schnappauf O, de Jesus AA, Aksentijevich I. "Chapter 70: Autoinflammatory Disorders." Manual of Molecular and Clinical Laboratory Immunology, 9th Edition. ASM/Wiley, 2024.
