= Carl and Clarence Aguirre =

Formerly conjoined twins

Clarence and Carl Aguirre
- Born: April 21, 2002 (age 24); Manila, Philippines

Clarence and Carl Aguirre (born April 21, 2002) are former conjoined twins born in Manila, Philippines. They were conjoined at the top of the head and shared 8 centimetres (3.1 in) of brain. More than 1–2 centimetres (0.4–0.8 in) will affect brain functionality in one or both of twins. Without separation, they were expected to live around 6–8 months.

== Biography ==
Arlene Aguirre, a Silaynon nurse working in Manila, discovered at her four-month ultrasound that her sons were conjoined twins. As a Catholic, she refused to have an abortion, and gave birth to Carl and Clarence on April 21, 2002, ten days before her due date, via C-section. The boys were craniopagus and were joined at the top of their heads, meaning they were unable to sit up or see each other. The doctors recommended the typical solution of sacrificing one child to save the other, but Arlene refused to choose which boy to save. She returned to her parents' home in Hacienda Paz, Silay, where her mother Evelina could help raise the boys. The boys' father was married and had four other children to support and was only able to provide small sums of money once a month.

By February 2003, the boys had difficulty eating and were often ill. The Philippine Airlines Foundation and the American nonprofit Children's Chance helped Arlene connect with New York neurosurgeon James T. Goodrich. Goodrich's team spent six months researching, preparing, and communicating with the Aguirres' doctors in the Philippines before they accepted the case. Arlene, Carl, and Clarence flew to the United States in September 2003 to have the boys separated.

In September 2003, tissue expanders (pouches filled with saline) were implanted under the boys' scalps to create more skin to cover the twins' wounds after separation. The surgeries began in October at the Children's Hospital at Montefiore in The Bronx, New York. The hospital covered their multi-million dollar medical expenses and continued to support them after their surgery.

On August 4, 2004, the final surgery was completed and, at two years old, Clarence and Carl became the first craniopagus twins to be separated using a staged method. Goodrich, plastic surgeon David A. Staffenberg, and their team performed four surgeries over ten months. During the surgery, Goodrich discovered two inches of shared brain were not detected in MRIs or during the first three surgeries. They were continuous rather than fused, making it more complicated to operate on, as severing a shared brain incorrectly would cause medical distress. He was able to find a narrow strip and the boys were successfully separated.

Most of the post-operative rehabilitation took place at Blythedale Children's Hospital in Valhalla, New York. Both wore helmets to protect their brains; when they are fully grown, their skulls will be patched, though no approximate date has been made publicly available.

Within just over a year, Clarence was able to walk short distances and Carl could walk using a walker; both boys were also learning to speak. By September 2014, the twins were still attending physical therapy at Blythedale. In the month following the surgery, Carl developed a seizure disorder, but by 2014, they were down to two a day rather than a dozen. However, he has had some degeneration in his right parietal lobe, has limited use of his left side, and uses either a wheelchair or leg braces to move around.

As of October 2021, Arlene and her sons live in Scarsdale, New York in a home that has been funded by a variety of charities, as Arlene has been unable to work on a medical visa.
