= Berish Strauch =

American plastic surgeon (1933–2023)

- Born: September 19, 1933; The Bronx, New York City, United States
- Died: December 24, 2023 (aged 90)
- Education: Columbia University (BA, MD)
- Occupation: plastic surgeon
- Employer: Montefiore Medical Center

Berish Strauch (September 19, 1933 – December 24, 2023) was an American plastic surgeon. He pioneered and developed the first toe-to-thumb transplant and the first inflatable prosthetic penis.

== Early life and education ==
Born in the Bronx, New York City, he was the son of Herman Strauch, a suit cutter in Manhattan's garment district, and Anna (Weiss) Strauch, a milliner. Observing his parents' precision in handling tools influenced his interest in surgery.

Strauch attended the Bronx High School of Science and graduated from Columbia University in 1955 with a pre-medical focus. He earned his medical degree from Columbia's College of Physicians and Surgeons in 1959.

== Career ==
After completing fellowships at Roosevelt Hospital in New York and Stanford Hospital in California, he joined Montefiore Medical Center in the Bronx.

In the late 1960s, Strauch became involved in the emerging field of microsurgery, utilizing microscopes and specialized instruments to repair tiny blood vessels, nerves, and ligaments. He became the chief of reconstructive surgery at Montefiore in 1978 and was appointed chairman when the division became a full-fledged department in 1987, a position he held until his retirement in 2007.

Strauch developed several surgical procedures and technologies, including techniques for removing excess skin from patients who had lost significant weight following bariatric surgery. In 1976, he performed one of the first toe-to-thumb transplants on a firefighter who had lost his thumb and could not have it reattached. He also contributed to the development of medical devices such as an inflatable penile prosthesis and a mechanism to reverse vasectomies.

In 1993, following the high-profile 1992 incident involving Amy Fisher and Mary Jo Buttafuoco, Strauch performed reconstructive surgery on Buttafuoco, who had sustained severe facial injuries. While the surgery addressed much of the damage, some nerve damage remained irreversible.

In 2010, Strauch and Charles Herman published the Encyclopedia of Body Sculpting After Massive Weight Loss.
