= White Plains Hospital =

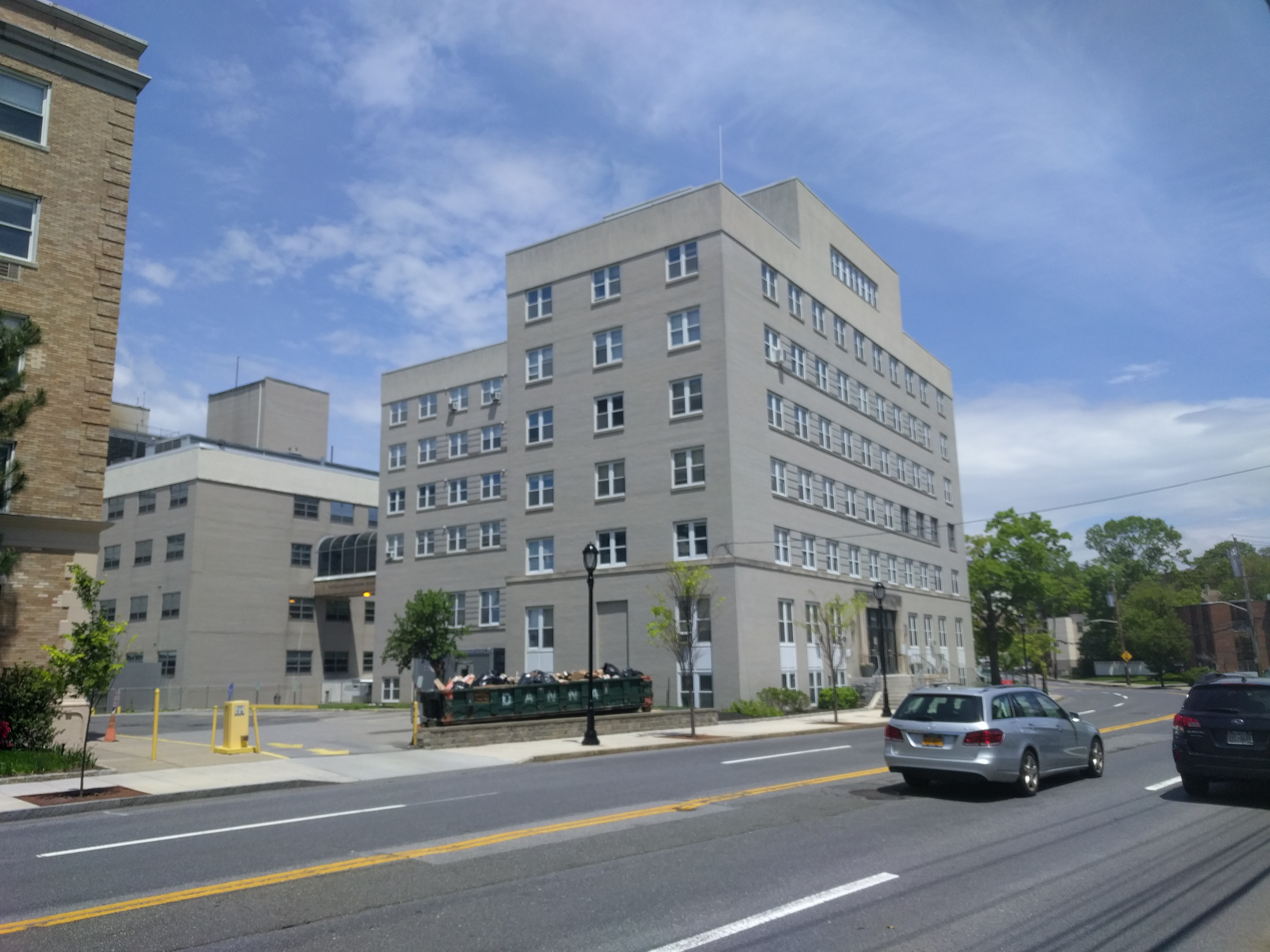

Geography
- Location: 41 East Post Road, White Plains, Westchester, New York, United States
- Coordinates: 41°1′33″N 73°46′9.5″W

Organization
- Care system: Private
- Type: General
- Network: Montefiore Health System

Services
- Emergency department: Yes
- Beds: 292

History
- Opened: 1893

Links
- Website: www.wphospital.org
- Lists: Hospitals in New York State

White Plains Hospital is a general medical and surgical, non-profit hospital located in White Plains, New York. In addition to providing general care to patients, it also operates a number of specialized programs, such as its cancer center. The hospital was founded in 1893 as a four-room hospital. As of 2012, White Plains Hospital treated 170,000 patients annually and is a member of the Montefiore Health System network. The total capacity of the hospital is 292 beds.

== History ==
White Plains Hospital was founded in 1893 before White Plains was incorporated as a city, though after there was an established village of White Plains. The 22 women and 3 men who founded the hospital sought to have medical care that could serve the surrounding community. A four-room building on Chatteron Hill comprised the facilities of the hospital. In its first year of operation, 31 patients were treated.

By 1907, the hospital had constructed a new brick building (that was demolished in 1940) in the location of the present-day emergency room. An additional wing was built in 1924, bringing the total bed capacity to 100.

Beginning at the 120th anniversary of the founding of White Plains Hospital, a major modernization and expansion project was undertaken. New facilities have been constructed to both increase the medical capabilities of the hospital and renovate its aesthetic qualities. A six-story tower was built that includes private rooms while operating rooms were updated with newer capabilities. Additionally, the hospital constructed a second cardiac catheterization lab and labor, delivery, and maternity units. The cancer center was expanded to double its size as well.

White Plains Hospital is Magnet Designated twice over in 2014 and 2016 and has won several awards. Healthgrades Outstanding Patient Experience in 2018. AACN Beacon Award of Excellence 2014 and 2017.

== Hospital rating data ==
The HealthGrades website contains the clinical quality data for White Plains Hospital, as of 2017. For this rating section three different types of data from HealthGrades are presented: clinical quality ratings for thirty inpatient conditions and procedures, thirteen patient safety indicators and the percentage of patients giving the hospital as a 9 or 10 (the two highest possible ratings).

For inpatient conditions and procedures, there are three possible ratings: worse than expected, as expected, better than expected. For this hospital the data for this category is:

- Worse than expected - 1
- As expected - 125
- Better than expected - 374

For patient safety indicators, there are the same three possible ratings. For this hospital safety indicators were rated as:

- Worse than expected - 2
- As expected - 130
- Better than expected - 368

Percentage of patients rating this hospital as a 9 or 10 - 95% Percentage of patients who on average rank hospitals as a 9 or 10 - 69%

== See also ==
- List of hospitals in New York
