= Burke Rehabilitation Hospital =

- Montefiore Health System

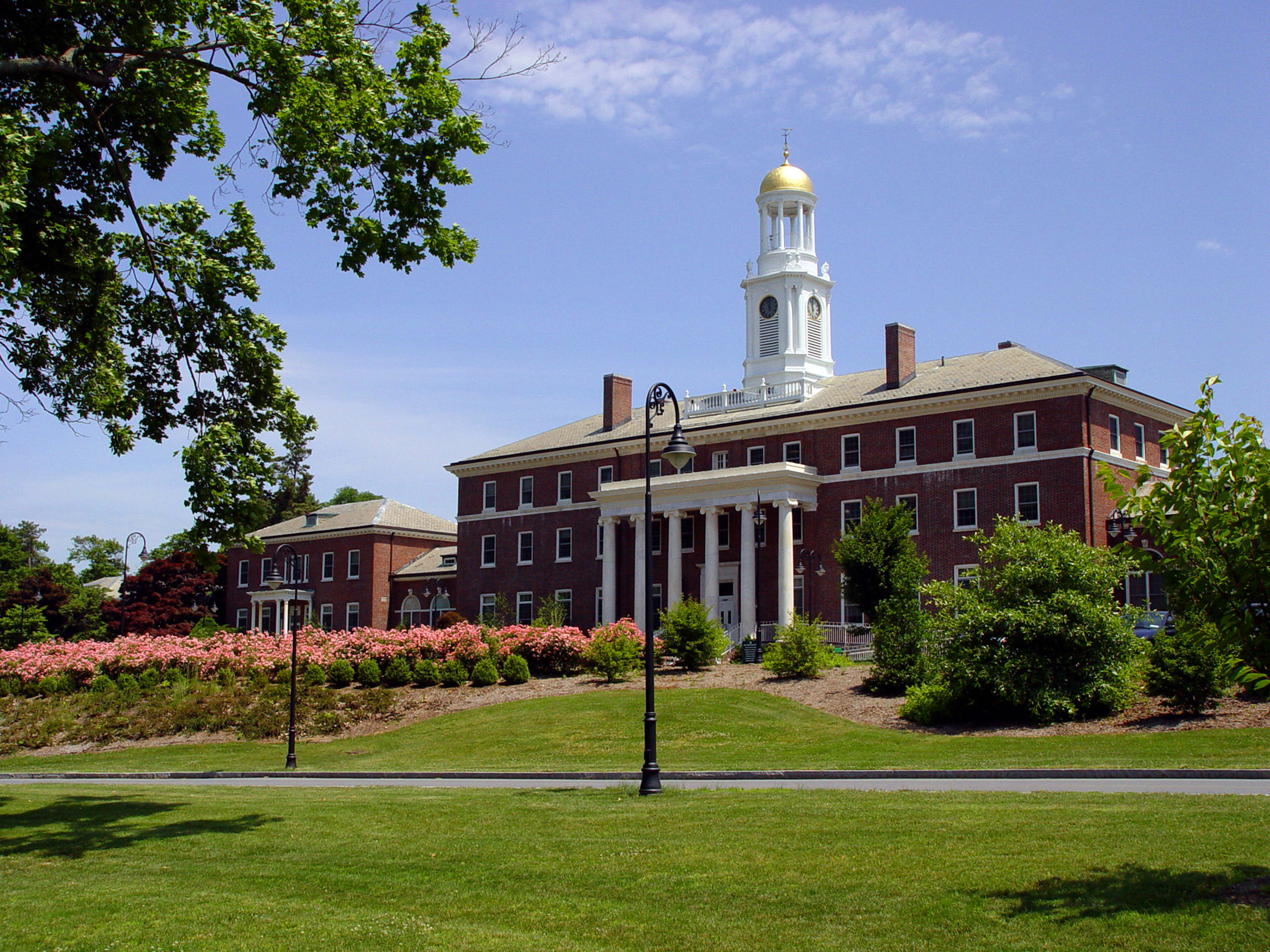

Geography
- Location: White Plains, Westchester, New York, USA
- Coordinates: 41°00′56″N 73°45′08″W

Organisation
- Care system: private
- Type: Non-profit

Services
- Beds: 150

History
- Founded: 1915

Links
- Website: www.burke.org
- Lists: Hospitals in New York State

Burke Rehabilitation Hospital is a non-profit, 150-bed acute rehabilitation hospital located in White Plains, New York. It is the only hospital in Westchester County entirely dedicated to rehabilitation medicine. Opening in 1915, Burke has been involved in medical rehabilitation for over one hundred years. As of January 2016, Burke is a member of the Montefiore Health System, Inc.

Burke provides inpatient and outpatient rehabilitation to patients with a broad range of neurological, musculoskeletal, cardiac, and pulmonary disabilities caused by disease or injury. Burke treats patients who have suffered a stroke, spinal cord injury, brain injury, amputations, complicated fractures, cardiac disease, arthritis and pulmonary disease as well as neurological disorders such as Alzheimer's disease, Parkinson's disease, and multiple sclerosis.

Patients are generally from the eastern United States, but Burke also sees patients from other parts of the U.S. and, through its International Patient Program, from abroad. It has approximately 600 employees and 17 full-time physicians.

Burke Rehabilitation Hospital is accredited by the Joint Commission and the Commission on Accreditation of Rehabilitation Facilities.

== History ==
Burke Rehabilitation Hospital was established by John Masterson Burke through his Winifred Masterson Burke Relief Foundation, named in honor of his mother. The hospital opened its doors on April 7, 1915 and initially treated patients for pneumonia, ulcers, fatigue, cardiac and thyroid disease.

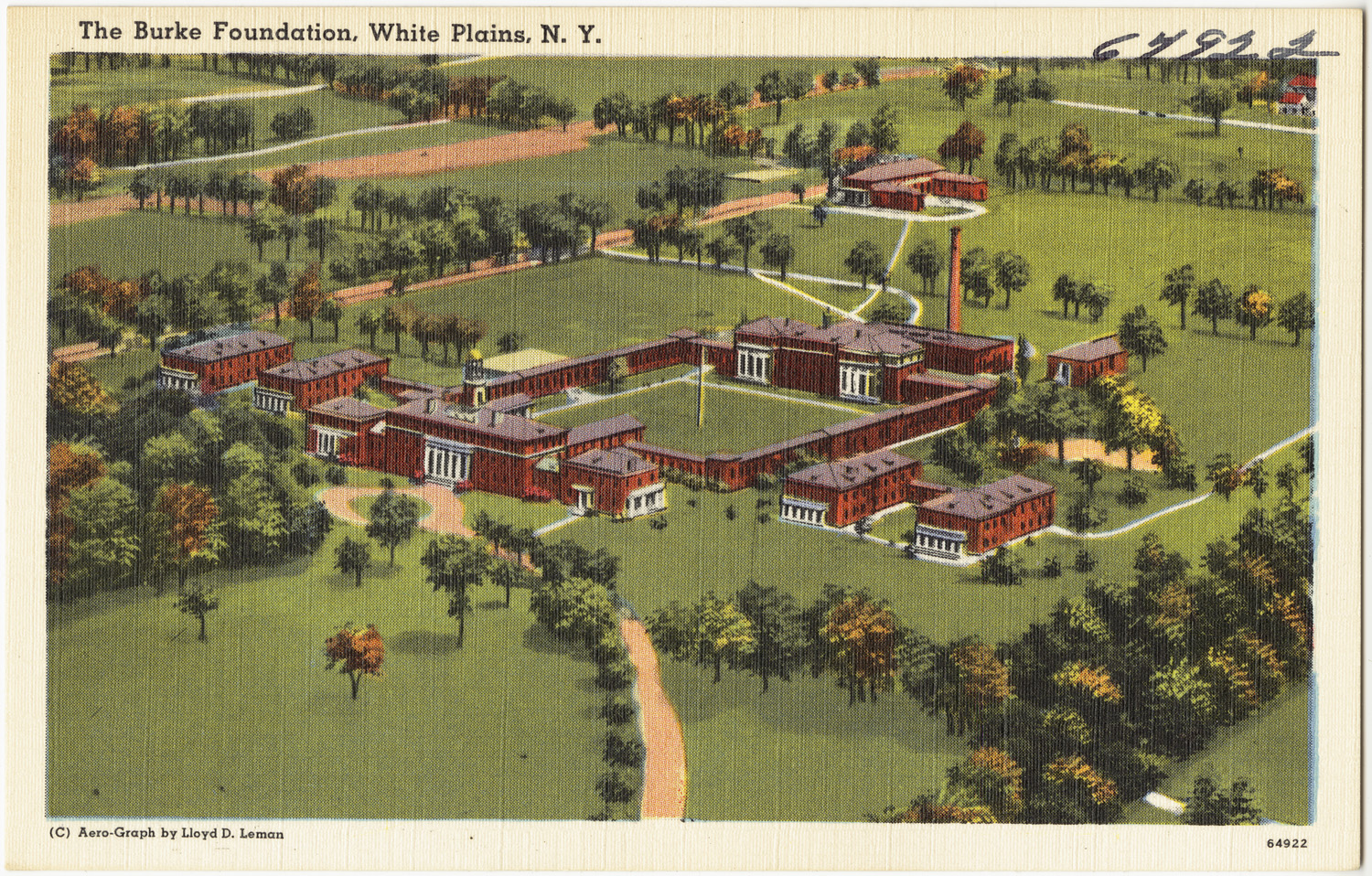
Illustrated 1940s-era postcard showing the full grounds and central courtyard

Along with medical supervision and treatments, the hospital's early programs also called for rigorous exercise and daily chores. It was one of the first institutions to encourage moderate exercise for cardiac patients, and also help in founding the American Heart Association in 1924.

During World War I, Burke was used as a naval hospital and served 2,000 sailors who became known as “Burke’s Navy.” The hospital's services were needed again after World War II when the number and nature of injuries suffered by veterans led to a renewed emphasis on physical and occupational therapies, improvements to prosthetic limbs and wheelchairs, and the development of community services.

In 1951, the same year the hospital became formally known as The Burke Rehabilitation Hospital, its focus became multi-disciplinary medical rehabilitation. Today, the hospital specializes in recovery from physical disabilities due to stroke, brain injuries, spinal cord injuries, Parkinson's disease, multiple sclerosis and other neurological disorders, cardiac disease, chronic pulmonary disease, arthritis, orthopedics and amputation.

== Programs ==
The hospital provides the following services:

- Brain Injury Rehabilitation
- Cardiac Rehabilitation
- Fitness Programs
- Geriatric Services
- Health fairs and health screenings
- Neurological Rehabilitation
- Neuropsychology Services
- Nutrition Services
- Occupational therapy
- Orthopedic Rehabilitation
- Outpatient therapy
- Pain Management
- Pastoral Services
- Physical therapy
- Physician Practice
- Pulmonary Rehabilitation
- Residency Program
- Social Work/Case management and assistance with government services
- Speech therapy
- Spinal Cord Injury Rehabilitation
- Sports Medicine
- Stroke Rehabilitation
- Support Groups
- Wound management services
