= Montefiore Einstein Medical Center =

- Montefiore Einstein Health System

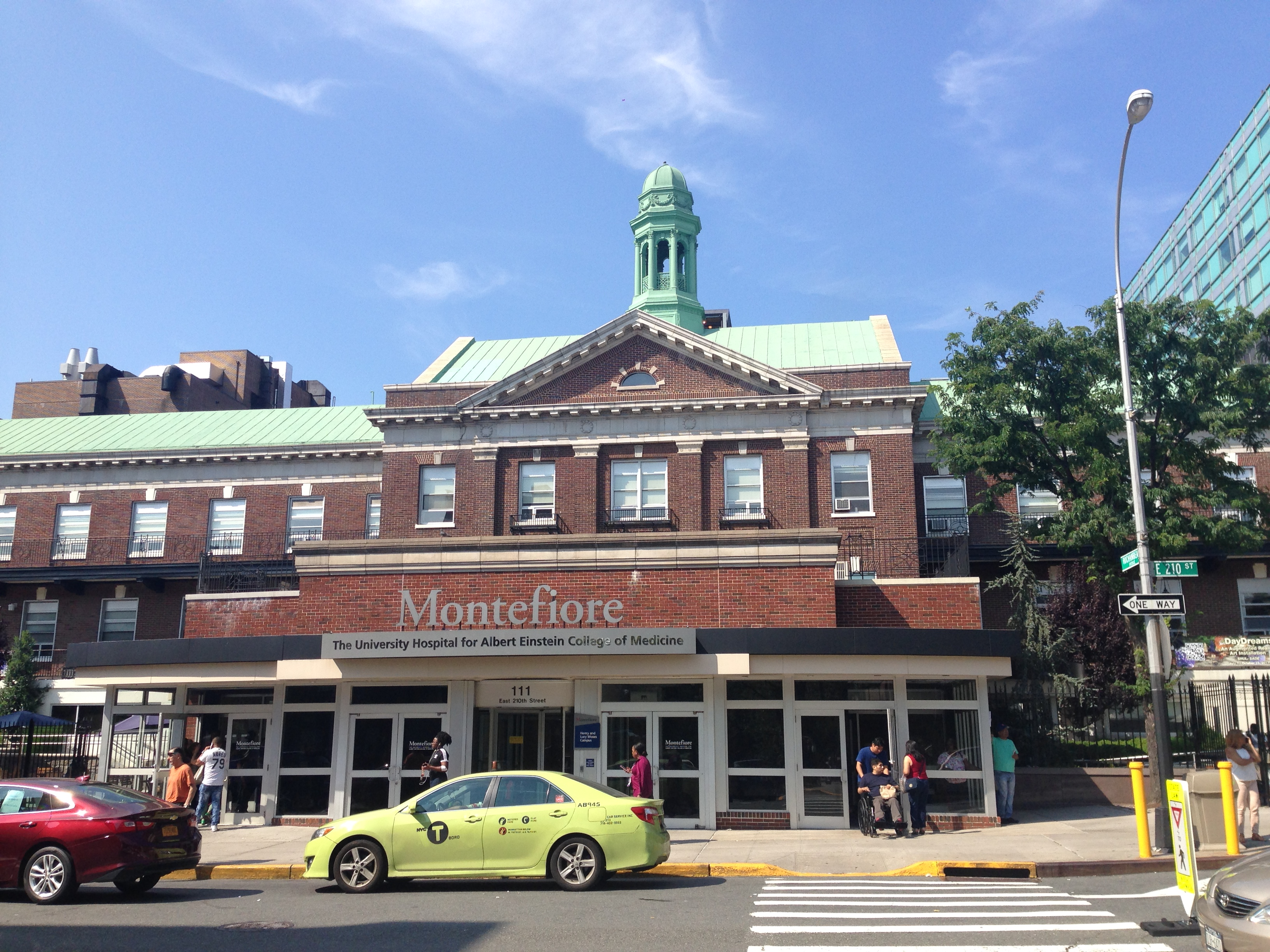
- Montefiore Medical Center's main entrance

Geography
- Location: 111 East 210th Street, The Bronx, New York, United States
- Coordinates: 40°52′49.35″N 73°52′44.67″W

Organization
- Care system: Private
- Type: Teaching
- Affiliated university: Albert Einstein College of Medicine

Services
- Emergency department: Yes
- Beds: 2,059

History
- Former names: Montefiore Home for Chronic Invalids (1884); Montefiore Home and Hospital for Chronic Diseases (1913); Montefiore Hospital for Chronic Diseases (1920)
- Constructed: 1913; 113 years ago (campus in The Bronx)
- Opened: 1884; 142 years ago

Links
- Website: www.montefiore.org
- Lists: Hospitals in New York State
- Other links: Hospitals in The Bronx

Montefiore Einstein Medical Center is an academic medical center that is the primary teaching hospital of the Albert Einstein College of Medicine in the Bronx, New York City. Its main campus, the Henry and Lucy Moses Division, is in the Norwood section of the northern Bronx. Named for Moses Montefiore, it was one of the 50 largest employers in New York as of 2005. In 2025, Montefiore was ranked No. 5 among New York City metropolitan area hospitals by U.S. News & World Report. Adjacent to the main hospital is the Children's Hospital at Montefiore, which serves individuals aged 0–21.

== History ==
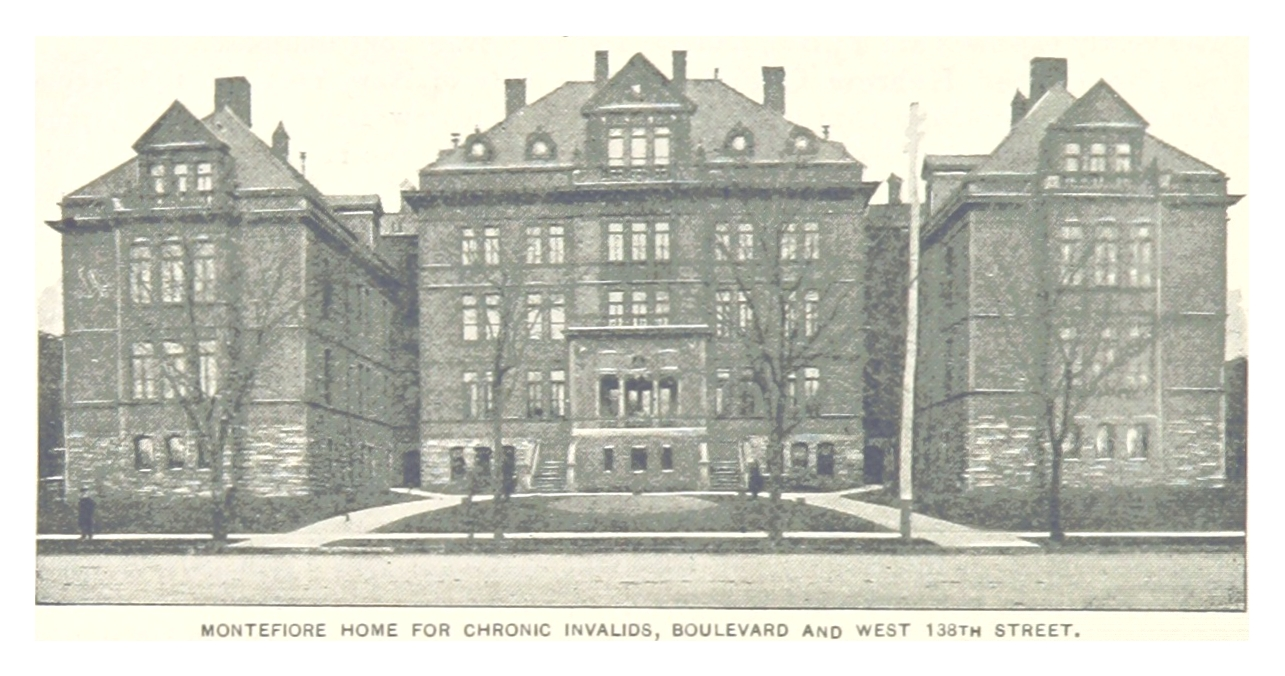
Home for Chronic Invalids, Ca. 1890

The birth of Montefiore Hospital arose from a series of meetings held in early 1884 among representatives of New York City's synagogues, convened by Henry Pereira Mendes, to honor Moses Montefiore on his forthcoming one-hundredth birthday. Out of these meetings, held in the rooms of Congregation Shearith Israel, the Montefiore Home for Chronic Invalids, now the Montefiore Hospital, came into being at East 84th Street in Manhattan and accepted its first six patients on October 24, 1884, Moses Montefiore's birthday. In its early years, it housed mostly patients with tuberculosis and other chronic illnesses. After growing out of its original building, the hospital moved uptown to Broadway and West 138th Street in 1888. In 1897, the Montefiore Home for Chronic Invalids established and managed the Montefiore Home Country Sanitarium in Westchester County, which mostly housed early-stage consumptives. The Montefiore Home for Chronic Invalids was renamed Montefiore Hospital for Chronic Diseases in 1901.

It moved again, to its current location in the Bronx and was renamed Montefiore Home and Hospital for Chronic Diseases in 1913. It was again renamed, as Montefiore Hospital for Chronic Diseases in 1920, as Montefiore Hospital and Medical Center on October 11, 1964, and as the Henry and Lucy Moses Division of Montefiore Medical Center in 1981 when it took over the daily operations of Einstein Hospital.

Montefiore established the first Department of Social Medicine and the first home health care agency in the United States. In 2001, it established a pediatric hospital, the Children's Hospital at Montefiore. The hospital made international headlines when a series of operations successfully separated the conjoined twins Carl and Clarence Aguirre of the Philippines. The Montefiore Headache Center, the oldest headache center in the world, was ranked number one among New York Best Hospitals in 2006 by New York Magazine. The Emergency Department is among the five busiest in the United States. Its hospitals provide more than 85,000 inpatient stays per year, including more than 7,000 births. In 2007, it was among over 530 New York City arts and social service institutions to receive part of a $20 million grant from the Carnegie Corporation, which was made possible through a donation by New York City mayor Michael Bloomberg. On September 9, 2015, Montefiore assumed operational and financial oversight of the Albert Einstein College of Medicine from Yeshiva University.

During the 2020 COVID-19 pandemic, Montefiore Medical Center – Moses division became one of the first designated COVID centers, and the first to achieve in-house COVID-19 testing in New York City using the polymerase chain reaction.

== Medical discoveries and advances ==
- The first intracardiac pacemaker to treat Stokes-Adams seizures associated with complete heart block was inserted by cardiothoracic surgeons at Montefiore.
- The association between endocarditis caused by Streptococcus bovis (which has since been renamed Streptococcus gallolyticus) and colon cancer was discovered by researchers at Montefiore.
- The first endovascular repair of an abdominal aortic aneurysm in the United States fannalswas done at Montefiore.

== Montefiore Health System ==
Montefiore Health System consists of 14 hospitals; a primary and specialty care network of more than 180 locations across Westchester County, the lower Hudson Valley and the Bronx; an extended care facility; the Montefiore School of Nursing, and its own Albert Einstein College of Medicine. In 2022, there were 1,530 staffed beds on its Moses Campus.

- Moses Division ("Montefiore Hospital"): the 726-bed hospital is the core of the health system, located in the Norwood section, and includes the Greene Medical Arts Pavilion, an outpatient care and diagnostic testing facility.
- The Children's Hospital at Montefiore: the 106-bed Children's Hospital at Montefiore, also located in Norwood, is a nationally ranked children's hospital.
- Jack D. Weiler Hospital ("Einstein Hospital"): the 431-bed Jack D. Weiler Hospital ("Einstein Hospital") is also operated by Montefiore and is located about 4 miles away, adjacent to the Albert Einstein College of Medicine in the Morris Park section.
- Montefiore Wakefield Hospital: in 2008, Montefiore acquired Our Lady of Mercy Medical Center, a 360-bed hospital in the north Bronx that had been part of the Catholic health system, and which currently provides inpatient and outpatient primary and consultative care for communities of the Bronx. It was named the North Division of Montefiore, and then the Wakefield Division. It had 345 beds in 2022.
- Burke Rehabilitation Hospital, an acute rehabilitation hospital located in White Plains, New York.
- White Plains Hospital: an affiliated hospital in White Plains, New York.
- Montefiore Mount Vernon Hospital in Mount Vernon, New York, 85 beds in 2022.
- Montefiore New Rochelle Hospital in New Rochelle, New York, 301 beds in 2022.
- Montefiore Nyack Hospital in Nyack, New York, 251 beds in 2022.
- Montefiore-St. Lukes Cornwall Hospital in Newburgh, New York, 193 beds in 2022.
- St. John's Riverside Hospital, an affiliate with one campus in Yonkers, New York and one campus in Dobbs Ferry, NY
- Montefiore Westchester Square: in March 2013, Montefiore acquired Westchester Square Medical Center, a community hospital that had operated under bankruptcy court protection for nearly seven years, renamed it Montefiore Westchester Square, closed the inpatient beds, and transformed it into a surgical center and free-standing emergency room. It had 140 beds in 2022.
- Saint Joseph's Medical Center, an affiliated hospital in Yonkers, New York.
- St. Vincent's Hospital Westchester, an affiliated hospital in Harrison, New York.
- Montefiore Medical Specialists of Westchester, an outpatient facility in Scarsdale, New York.
- Montefiore St. Luke's Cornwall Outpatient Center in Cornwall, New York.
- Montefiore Medical Park: Montefiore Medical Park, an ambulatory care facility that contains offices for outpatient visits, full-time clinical practices, and administrative offices for clinical departments, is a short distance away from Einstein.

Montefiore is also home to the Montefiore Einstein Comprehensive Cancer Center, the Montefiore Einstein Center for Heart and Vascular Care, and the Montefiore Einstein Center for Transplantation. Montefiore also runs a residency Program in Social Medicine, one of the nation's oldest programs focused on preparing physicians to practice in underserved communities.

In 2013, Montefiore Medical Center purchased the 300,000-square-foot former Kraft Foods technical center in Tarrytown, Westchester County.

Images of Montefiore campuses and buildings
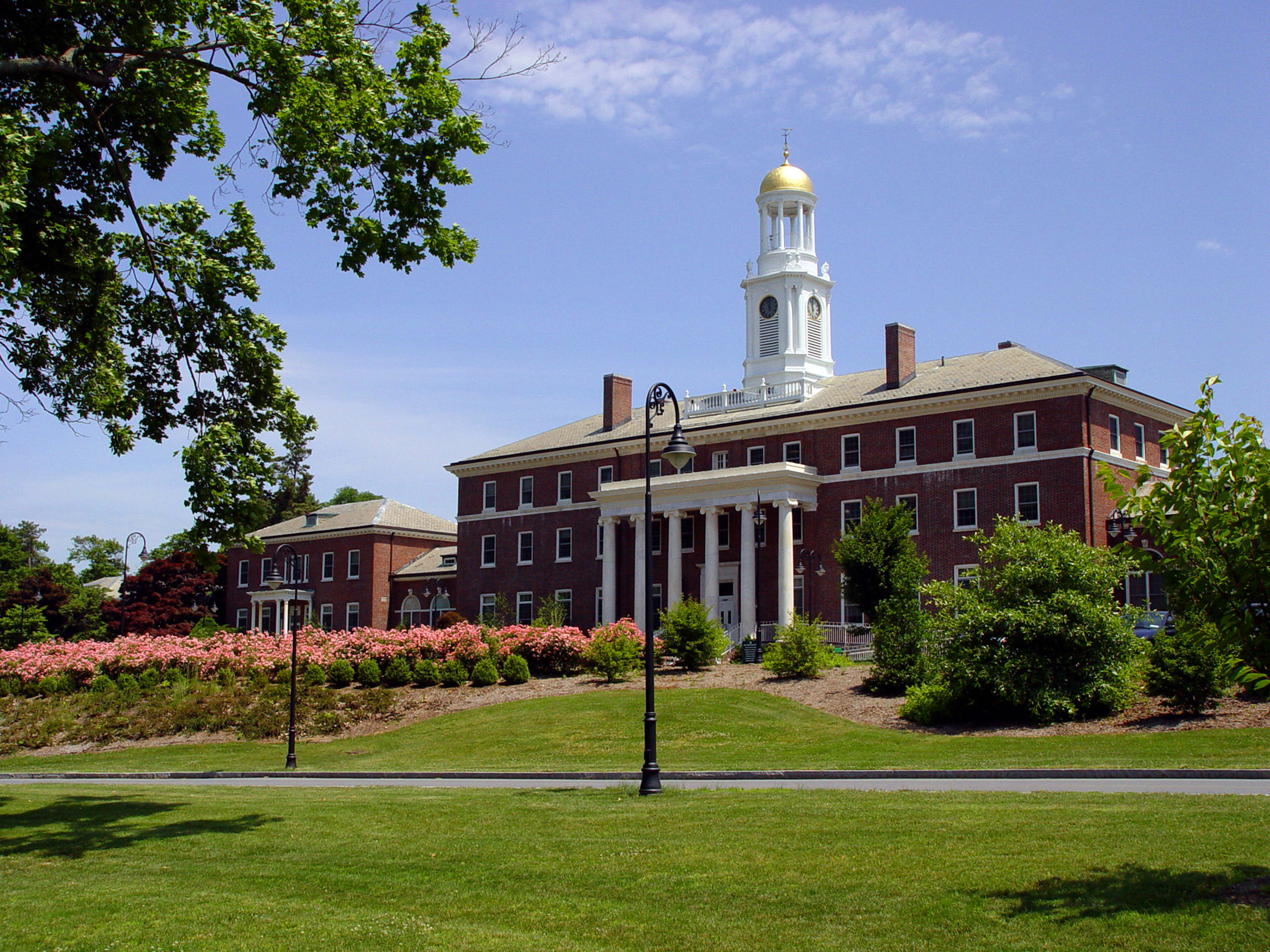
Burke Rehabilitation Hospital

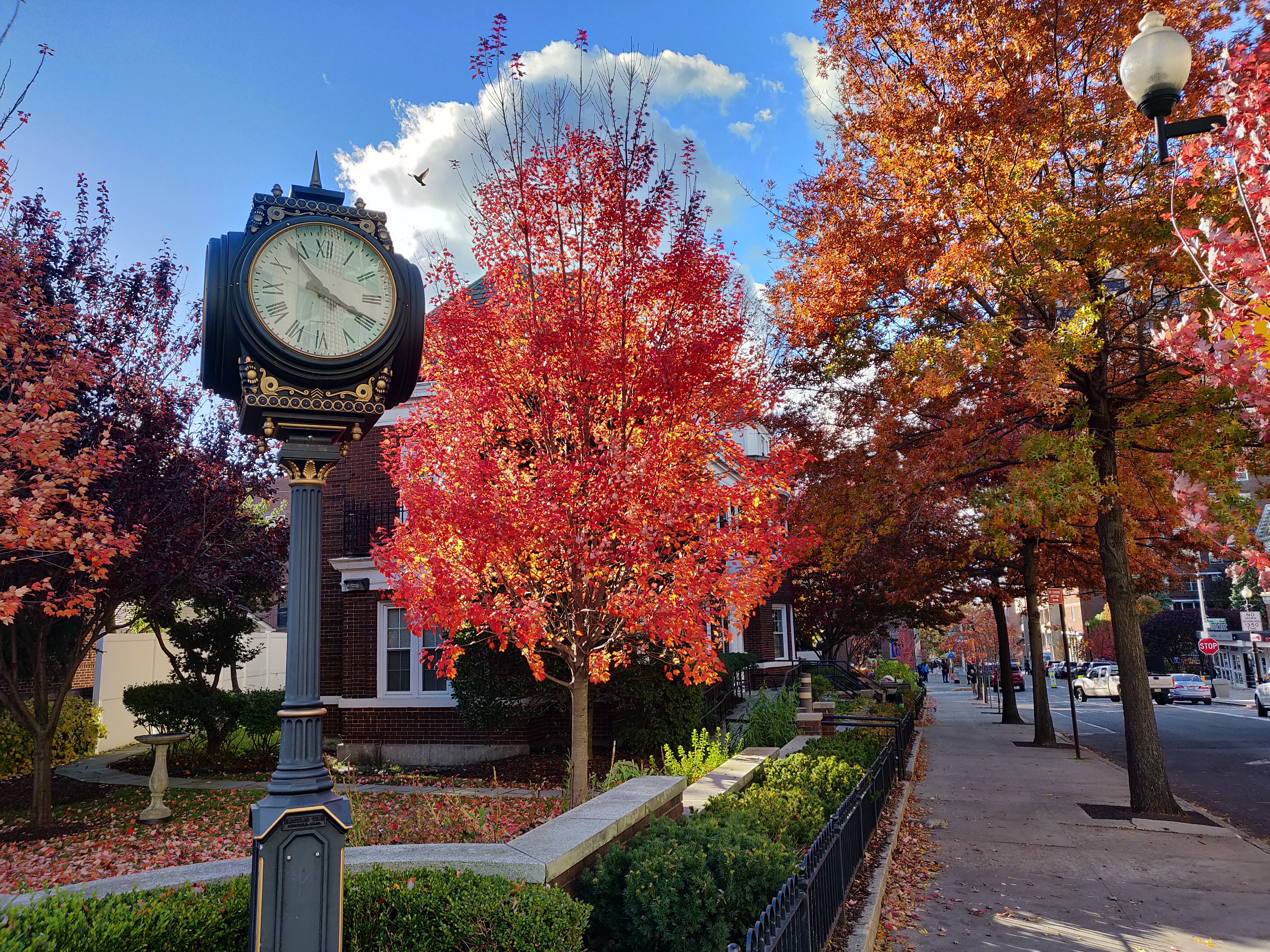
Graduate Medical Education office

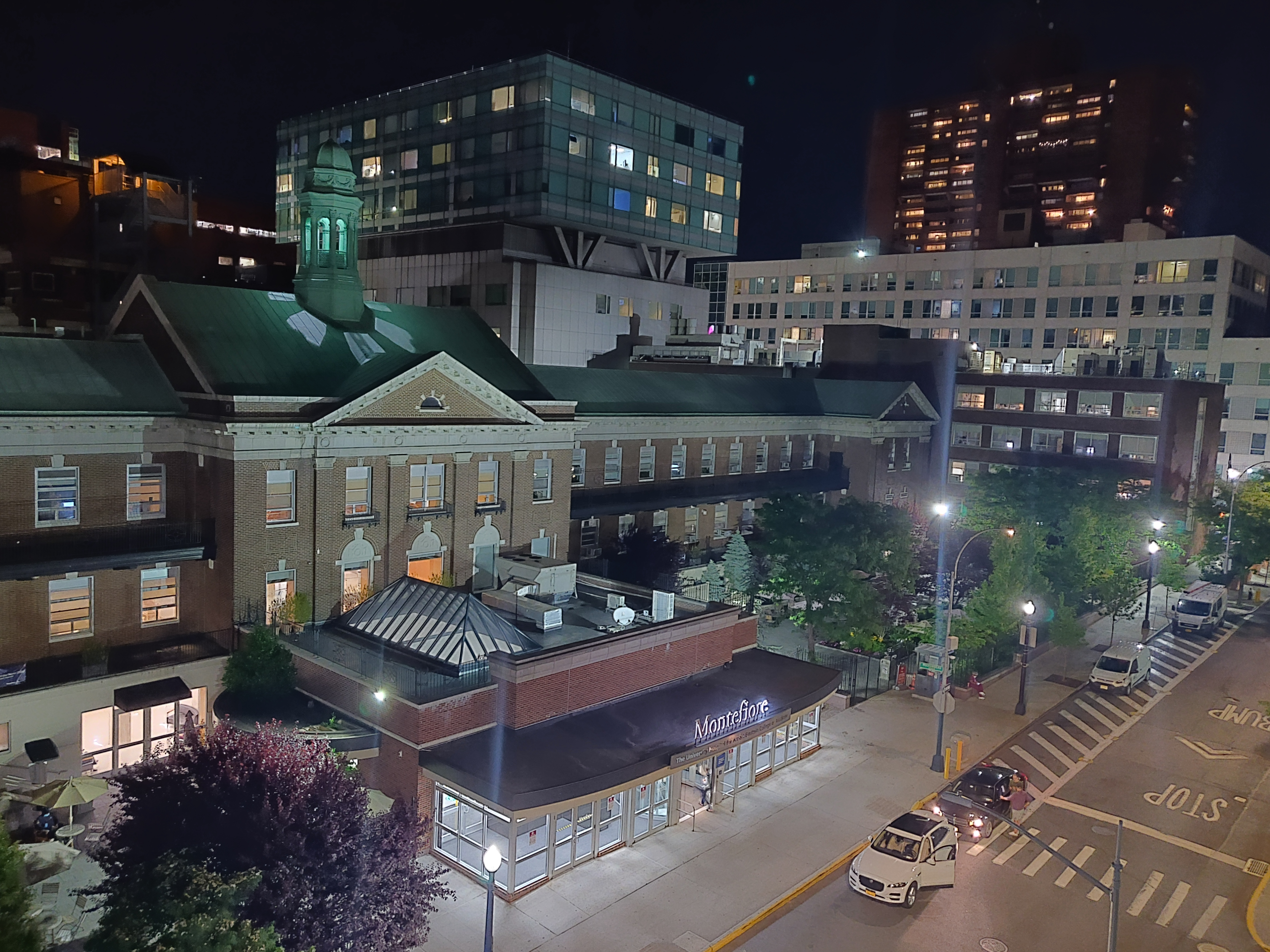
Moses Campus

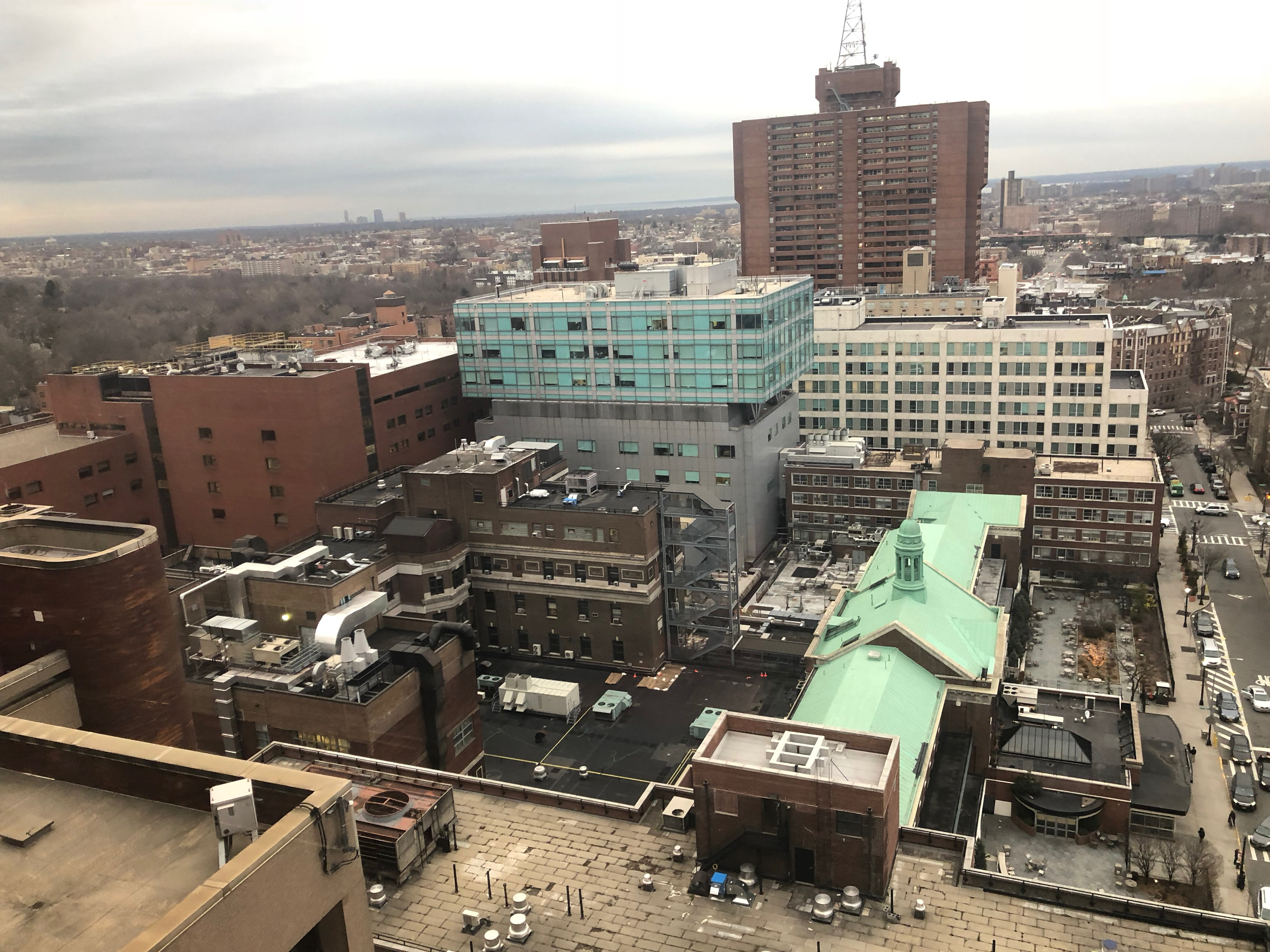
Norwood campus in the Bronx

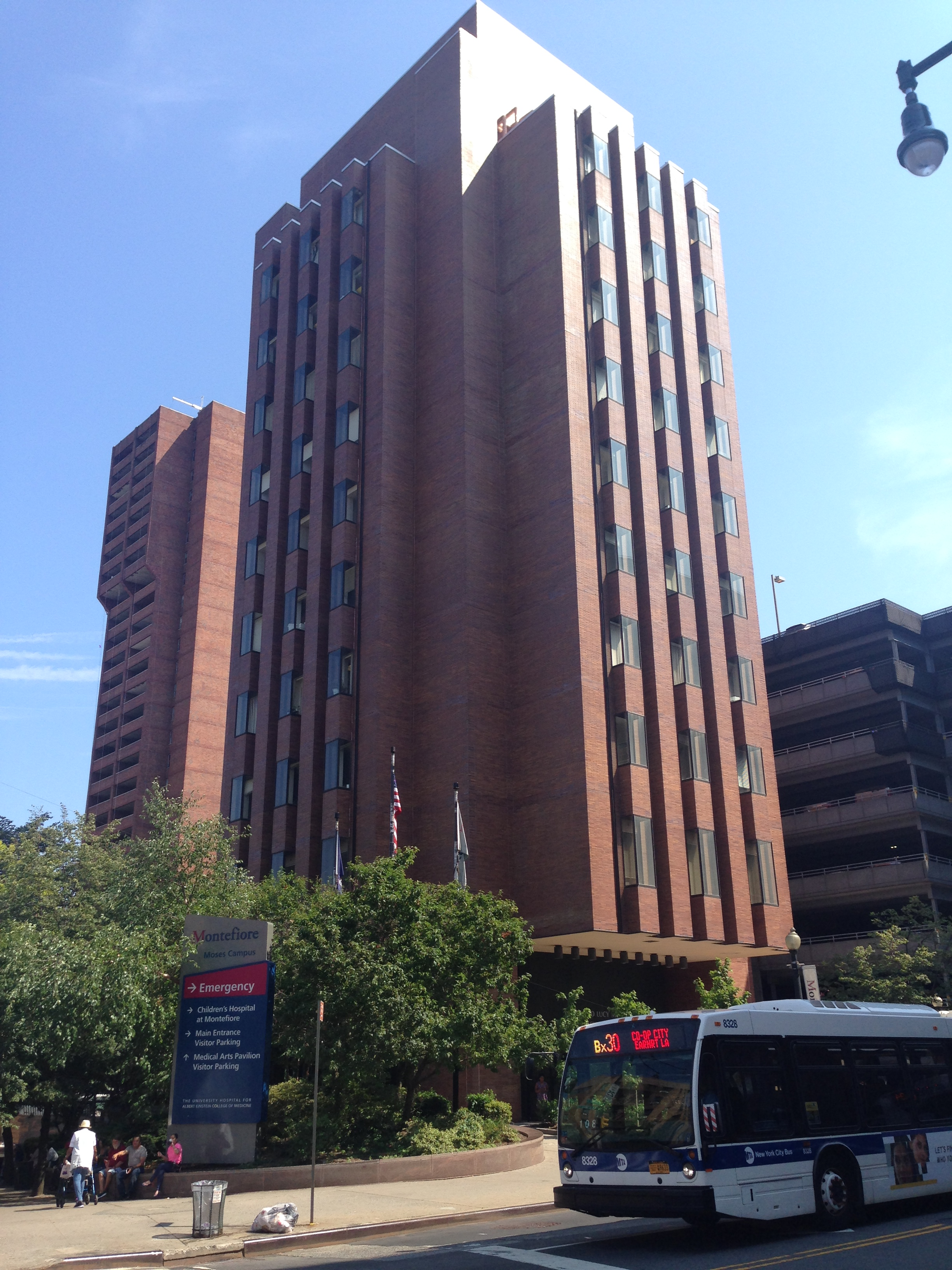
Henry and Lucy Moses Research Institute in Norwood

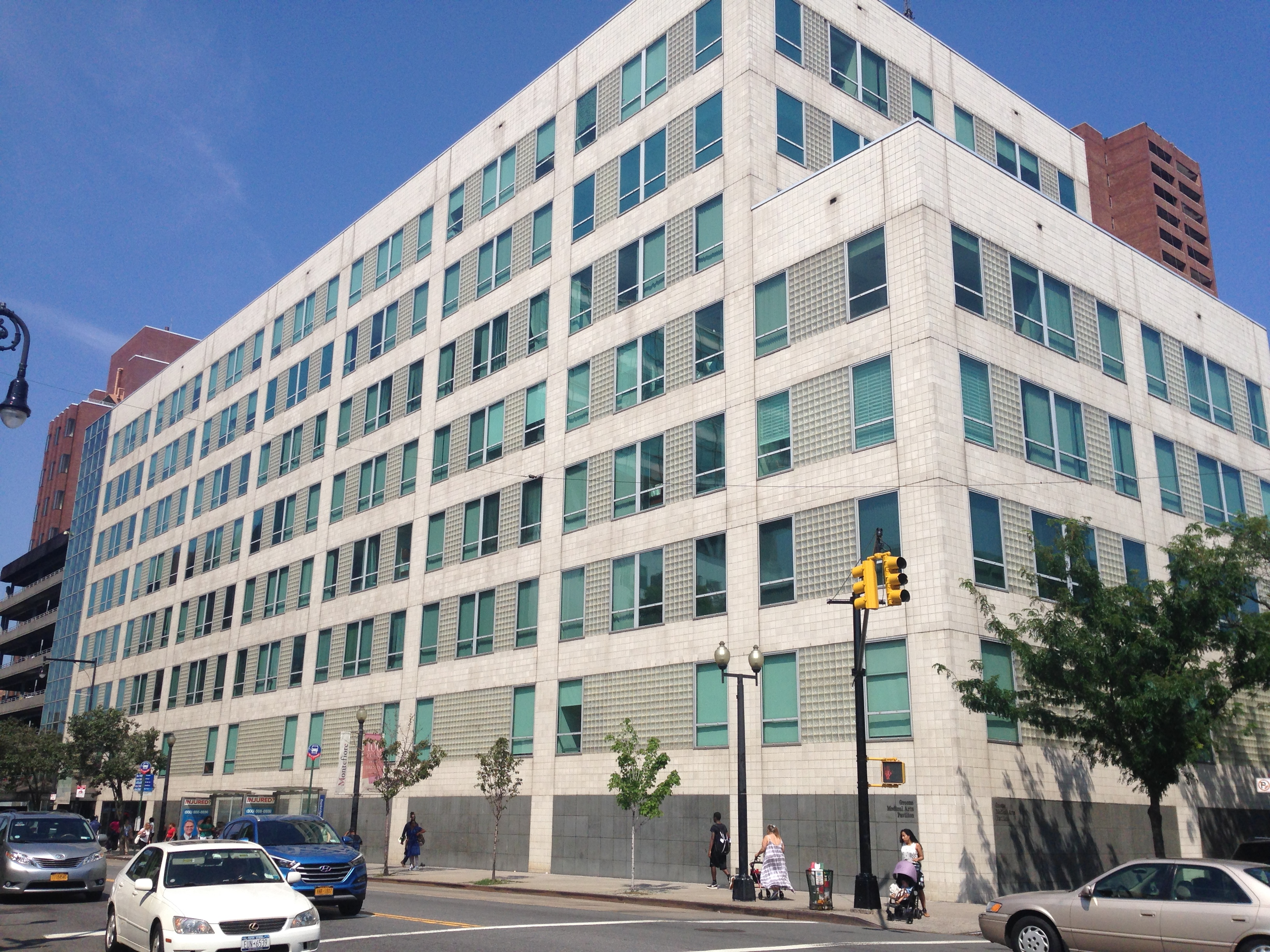
Greene Medical Arts Pavilion in Norwood

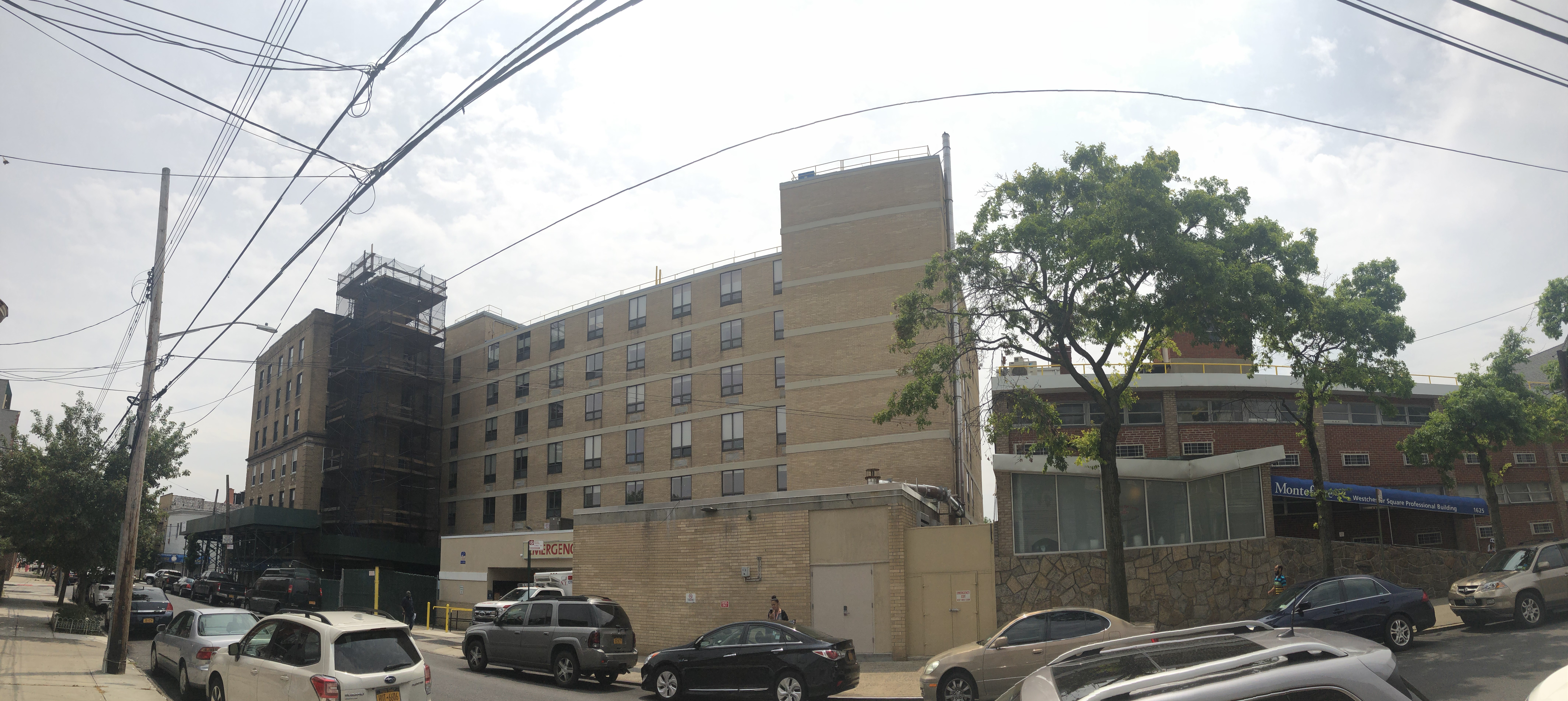
Westchester Square hospital

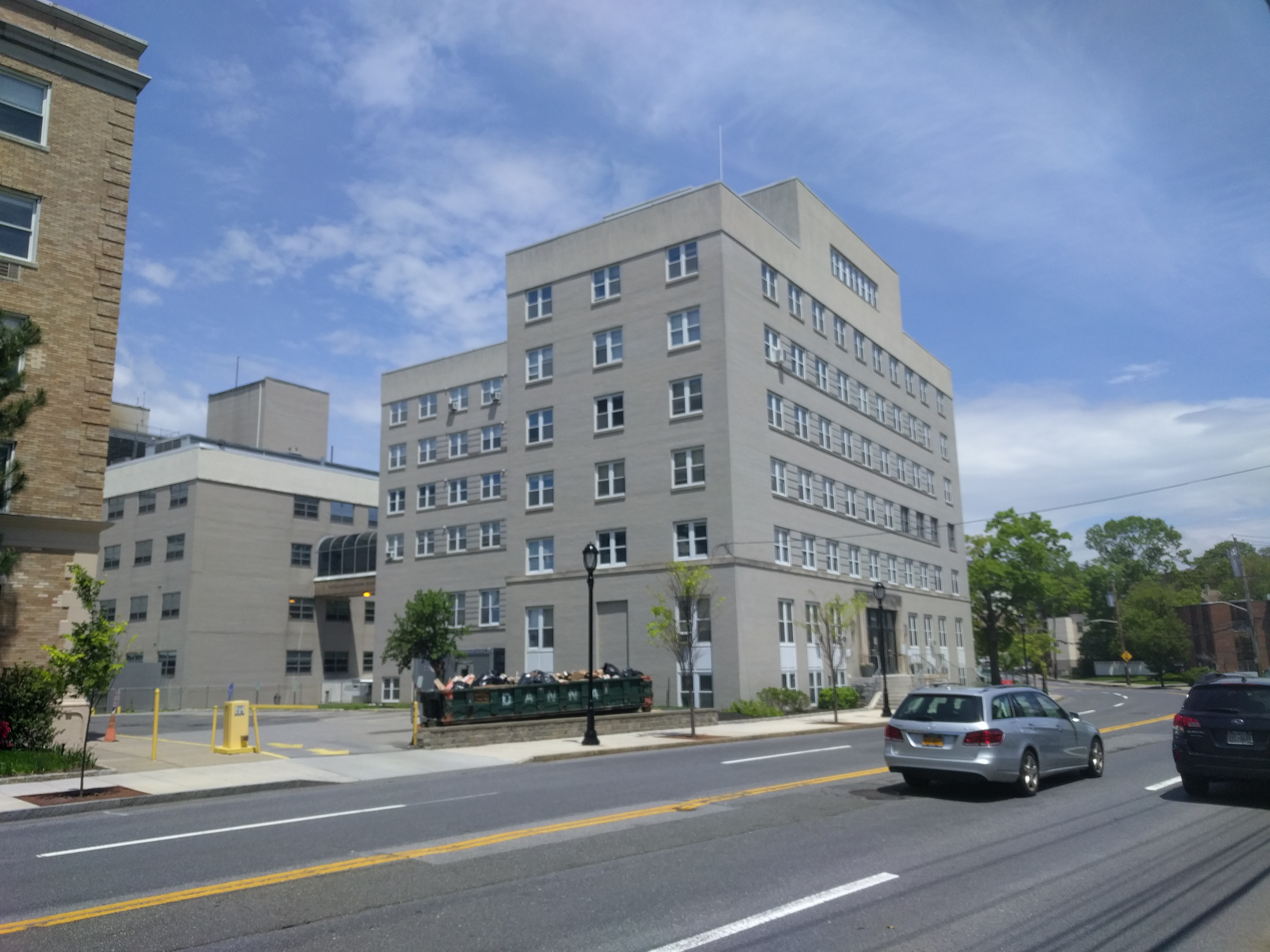
White Plains Hospital

=== Affiliations ===
- 1963: "an active affiliation" with Beth Abraham Hospital

== Education ==
Montefiore is a primary clerkship site for third-year and fourth-year medical students at the Albert Einstein College of Medicine. Einstein offers joint residency programs between Montefiore Medical Center and Jacobi Medical Center in Internal medicine, child neurology, dermatology, emergency medicine, general surgery, neurology, obstetrics and gynecology, ophthalmology, orthopedic surgery, otolaryngology, plastic surgery, rehabilitation medicine, urology, and vascular surgery, as well as other sub-specialties. As one of the largest medical residency programs in the country, Montefiore provides postgraduate clinical training to more than 1,400 residents across 150 accredited residency and fellowship programs. Montefiore School of Nursing was also established in 2017 at New Rochelle Hospital and has since then graduated over 250 Registered Nurses.

=== Residency Program in Social Medicine ===
The Montefiore Residency Program in Social Medicine is one of the oldest primary care training programs in the United States. It is located in Bronx, New York which contains some of the poorest urban districts in the United States. It is managed by the Montefiore Department of Family and Social Medicine and offers training in 3 primary care specialties: internal medicine, family medicine and pediatrics. It has trained over 700 physicians in primary care with a focus on medically underserved populations.

The program was founded in 1970 by Drs. Harold Wise and David Kindig. In 1973 family practice was added as a third track. Residents worked in partnerships and maintained their continuity practices at the Dr. Martin Luther King Jr. Health Center, which Dr. Wise had begun in 1968. The RPSM was their response to the difficulty of recruiting physicians to MLK who could work effectively with the community and other members of the health care team. At the time MLK was the flagship of the neighborhood health center movement of the Office of Economic Opportunity, the main federal agency coordinating Lyndon Johnson's War on Poverty.

In 1973 Dr. Jo Ivey Boufford, one of the residency program's first pediatric graduates, became its director and began developing the social medicine curriculum in which all three disciplines shared. This included health systems skills, such as medical care organization and economics; community and organizational skills, such as medical anthropology, Spanish and community-based projects; research and evaluation skills, such as epidemiology, biostatistics, and health services research; and educational and teaching skills, including patient education and curriculum development.

In 1977 the family practice track moved its continuity practice from the Martin Luther King Health Center to North Central Bronx Hospital and in 1980 the Montefiore Family Health Center was opened and became the primary site for residency training and faculty practice in family medicine. Because of MLK's fiscal problems, the pediatrics and internal medicine tracks moved to St. Barnabas Hospital in 1986. In 1990 several independent community health centers affiliated with MMC were organized into the Montefiore Ambulatory Care Network under Dr. Robert Massad. In 1991 pediatrics and internal medicine moved to the Ambulatory Care Network, now divided between the Comprehensive Health Care Center in the South Bronx and the Comprehensive Family Care Center in the East Bronx. In 1997, when the Comprehensive Health Care Center moved into a new facility, the social internal medicine and pediatrics tracks were again consolidated there. The Comprehensive Health Care Center, Comprehensive Family Care Center, and Family Health Center are all federally qualified health centers.

In 1992 the Department of Family Medicine at Montefiore, which administers the Residency Program in Social Medicine, became an academic department at the Albert Einstein College of Medicine with a Division of Research, a required third year clerkship for medical students, and its own inpatient ward at Montefiore. Dr. Massad became the first Chairman of Family Medicine at Einstein with affiliated residencies at Bronx-Lebanon Hospital Center. In 1993 Dr. Massad received national recognition awards from both the National Association of Community Health Centers and the Society of Teachers of Family Medicine. In 1995 the Residency Program in Social Medicine became the first organization to receive the National Primary Care Achievement Award in Education from the Pew Charitable Trust. In 1996 the Ambulatory Care Network merged with the Montefiore Medical Group and another graduate of the Social Medicine residency program, Dr. Kathryn Anastos, was recruited as its first medical director. Family practice residents began work at the Castle Hill and Valentine Lane family practices, where medical students had been rotating since 1993. In 1998 Dr. Massad was succeeded by another Social Medicine residency graduate, Dr. Peter Selwyn, as Chair of the Department of Family Medicine and Community Health. Dr. Selwyn enlarged the Research Division and initiated a Palliative Care Service, including inpatient hospice beds.

In 2000 the Valentine Lane Family Practice was transferred to the St. John's Riverside Hospital System in Yonkers, and half of the family practice residency moved to the Williamsbridge Family Practice. In 2001 members of the department established the first Hispanic Center of Excellence in New York State at the medical school. In 2003 the department established the Bronx Center to Reduce and Eliminate Ethnic and Racial Health Disparities, the first National Institutes of Health Center of Excellence in a department of family medicine. After the Einstein Department of Epidemiology and Social Medicine was renamed the Department of Epidemiology and Population Health in 2004, the residency program was housed under the Department of Family and Social Medicine in 2005.

==== Notable alumni and faculty ====
- Peter Angritt – Colonel in the United States Army Medical Corps who served as the leader of the Division of AIDS Pathology at the Armed Forces Institute of Pathology among other key roles
- Lucille C. Gunning – African American pediatrician and children's cancer specialist who pursued sub-specialty qualifications in pediatric psychiatry at Montefiore during the 1960s and subsequently served as director of pediatric rehabilitation at Montefiore during the late 1960s and early 1970s; she was then appointed as director of pediatric rehabilitation at Harlem Hospital and, later, deputy director of medical services of the Westchester Developmental Disabilities Service
- Camara Jones – Family physician and epidemiologist who works on the impact of racism on the health
- David Kindig – Emeritus Professor of Population Health Sciences and Emeritus Vice-Chancellor for Health Sciences at the University of Wisconsin–Madison, School of Medicine and Public Health
- Denise Rodgers – Vice chancellor for inter-professional programs at Rutgers University
- Steven Sayfer – chief executive officer of the Montefiore Health System (2008–2019)

== Leadership ==
Steven M. Safyer, M.D. was president and chief executive officer of Montefiore from 2008 to 2019. Before that Safyer had been at Montefiore for 30 years, as a medical resident, an attending physician, and then vice president and chief medical officer.

In November 2019, the board of trustees named Philip O. Ozuah as the chief executive officer of Montefiore beginning November 15, 2019. He had been the physician-in-chief of Montefiore Children's Hospital.

== See also ==
- Albert Einstein College of Medicine
- Burke Rehabilitation Hospital
- Carl and Clarence Aguirre, conjoined twins who were surgically separated in the hospital
- Montefiore New Rochelle Hospital
- North Central Bronx Hospital
- Norwood News
- NYC Health + Hospitals/Jacobi (Jacobi Medical Center)
- Program for Jewish Genetic Health
- White Plains Hospital
