= Samuel D. Levy =

American judge (1860–1940)

- Born: Samuel David Levy; January 12, 1860; New York City, New York
- Died: December 26, 1940 (aged 80); New York City, New York
- Education: New York University School of Law
- Occupations: Lawyer, judge
- Spouse: Millie Irene Berg (after 1889)
- Parent(s): David Levy; Babetta Koenigsberger

Samuel David Levy (January 12, 1860 – December 26, 1940) was a Jewish-American lawyer and judge from New York City.

== Early life ==
Levy was born on January 12, 1860, in New York City, New York, the son of David Levy and Babetta Koenigsberger. His father was from Bohemia and his mother was a German immigrant from Walsdorf, Bavaria.

Levy attended public school and spent four years in evening high schools. He began working in law offices in different capacities in 1873, and in 1879 he went to the New York University School of Law. He completed the two year program in a single year and graduated from the school with an LL.B. in 1880. He was admitted to the bar that year and began practicing law.

== Career ==
After being admitted to the bar, Levy became counsel for several large corporations and specialized in cooperation, commercial, and real estate law as well as negligence suits and equity cases. Active in various public services, he was a director of the United Hebrew Charities from 1882 to 1895, its counsel without pay from 1889 to 1895, and an associate patron. By 1903, he was a public school trustee in the Eleventh Ward, secretary of Charity Organization Society in District No. 4, a patron of the Montefiore Home for Chronic Invalids, and a member of the societies of various Jewish charitable organizations. He was elected president of the Hebrew Sheltering Guardian Society in 1896 and was re-elected president every year until 1905, when he became its vice-president until 1930. As an officer of the Society, he was instrumental in adopting the cottage plan of caring for the Society's orphans. He also helped establish the Jewish Protectory and Hawthorne School in Hawthorne, served as chairman of the New York committee of the National Jewish Hospital for Consumptives in Denver, Colorado, and wrote a number of monographs on child psychology, especially with regards to delinquency.

In 1913, Mayor William Jay Gaynor appointed Levy Magistrate to succeed Moses Herrman. In 1916, Mayor John Purroy Mitchel appointed him to the Court of Special Sessions to succeed Frederic Kernochan and assigned him to the Children's Court. His successor as Magistrate was Alexander Brough. Mayor John Francis Hylan reappointed him to the Children's Court for a full ten-year term in 1923. Mayor Fiorello La Guardia reappointed him to the Court for another ten-year term in 1934. By then, he was Justice of the Domestic Relations Court, as the Children's Court merged with the Family Court to become the Domestic Relations Court in 1933. He resigned as Justice in 1935. His successor as Justice of the Domestic Relations Court was Justine Wise Tulin, the daughter of Rabbi Stephen S. Wise, whose appointment as Justice made her the first woman in the state of New York to hold a judicial office higher than magistrate.

== Personal life ==
In 1889, Levy married Millie Irene Berg, the sister of prominent physicians and surgeons Dr. Henry W. Berg and Dr. Albert A. Berg.

Levy died at Mt. Sinai Hospital from a stroke on December 26, 1940, and was buried in the Union Fields Cemetery.

=== Legacy ===
Over 300 people attended his funeral at Temple Emanu-El, many of them members of the judiciary. The Temple's rabbi, Samuel H. Goldenson, officiated the service and delivered the eulogy. The honorary pallbearers were headed by Court of Appeals Chief Justice Irving Lehman and included Federal Judge William Bondy, Supreme Court Justice Mitchell May, Domestic Relations Court presiding justice John Warren Hill, former Court of General Sessions judge Cornelius F. Collins, Hebrew Sheltering Guardian Society chairman Sam A. Lewisohn, John Burke, and Henry Gaisman. The funeral was also attended by Domestic Relations Court Justices Joseph F. Maquire, Herbert O'Brien, Bruce Cobb, Stephen S. Jackson, and Jacob Panken, former Domestic Relations Court Justices Peter B. Hanson, Isaac Siegel, and Charles C. Brandt, Supreme Court Justices Harry E. Lewis, Meier Steinbrink, and Algernon I. Nova, former Board of Education president Henry C. Turner, Kings County administrative officer of the Domestic Relations Court Louis Wolff, former Board of Education member and impartial administrator of the painting industry Louis S. Posner, and novelist Fannie Hurst.

In 1942, a portrait of Levy commissioned by his widow was hung in the Children's Court at 137 East 22nd Street, where he served more than thirteen years.
