= Peter Angritt =

American clinical pathologist (1938–2024)

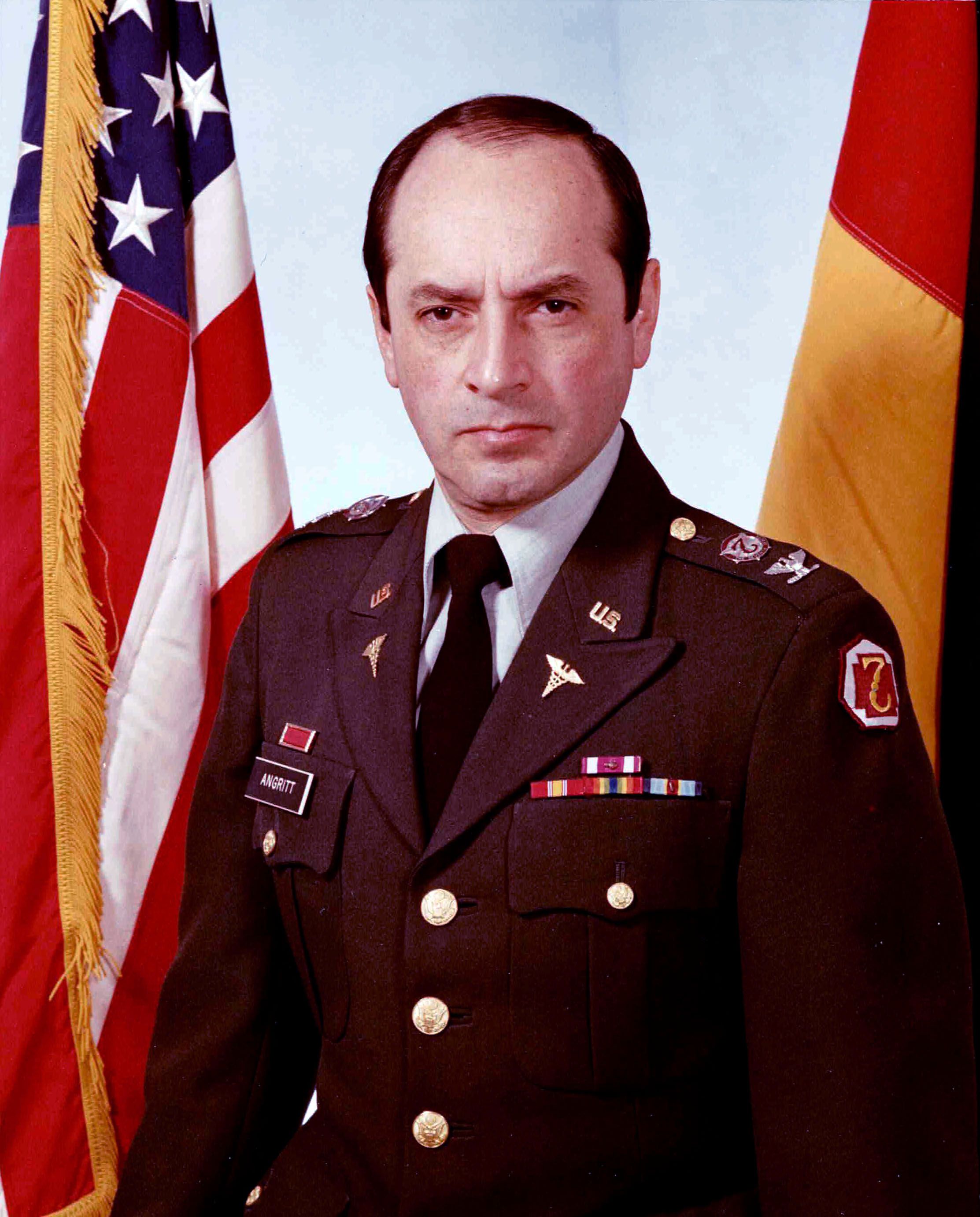
- Born: April 11, 1938; Bogotá, Colombia
- Died: February 23, 2024 (aged 85); San Antonio, Texas, U.S.
- Military career
- Allegiance: United States
- Branch: United States Army
- Service years: 1969–1994
- Rank: Colonel
- Awards: Meritorious Service Medal.
- Medical career
- Field: Pathology
- Institutions: Armed Forces Institute of Pathology; Walter Reed Army Medical Center; 7th Medical Command; Tripler Army Medical Center; Gorgas Hospital; Brooks Army Medical Center; Darnall Army Hospital; Reynolds Army Hospital
- Sub-specialties: Clinical Pathology

Peter Angritt (born Pedro Antonio Angarita Riveros, April 11, 1938 – February 23, 2024). was a colonel in the United States Army who served as a physician specializing in clinical pathology for the United States Army Medical Corps

== Education ==
Angritt earned his Doctor of Medicine degree from National University of Colombia School of Medicine in 1965. His study of pathology began at their University Hospital and then continued at the Montefiore Medical Center.

== Career ==
In the 1970s, as a Lieutenant Colonel, Angritt served as the Chief of Pathology and Laboratory Services at Gorgas Hospital in Ancón, Panama.

In the late 1970s and early 1980s he served as Chief of the Department of Pathology and Lab Services at Tripler Army Medical Center.

As a Colonel, he was appointed Commander of the 10th Medlab, 7th Medical Command, in Landstuhl, Germany through the mid-1980s.

Angritt continued his service as the head of the Division of AIDS Pathology at the Armed Forces Institute of Pathology from the late 1980s through the mid-1990s.

== Research ==
Col Angritt co-authored dozens of often cited articles about opportunistic infections and infectious diseases, particularly how they impacted patients with HIV/AIDS. Notable among them are related to Panniculitis and Cat Scratch Disease. His work is particularly mentioned in relation to Kaposi's Sarcoma.

== Awards and recognitions ==
Meritorious Service Medal
National Defense Service Medal
Joint Meritorious Unit Award
Army Meritorious Unit Commendation
Army Service Ribbon
Army Overseas Service Ribbon

Col Angritt was inducted as a member of the Order of Military Medical Merit.

== Personal life ==
Angritt was married to Rubby Angritt and had two children.
