= Montefiore Home for Chronic Invalids =

American sanatorium (est. 1884)

Coordinates: 40.8805°N 73.8797°W

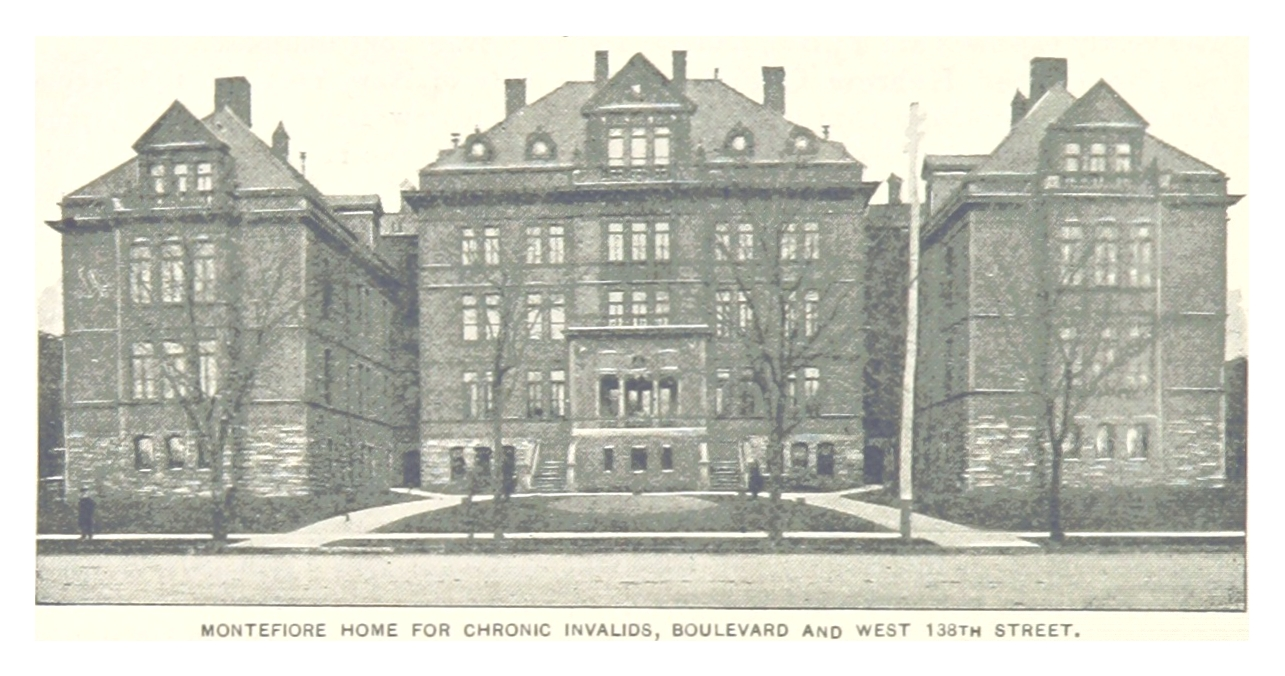
Broadway and West 138th Street, Manhattan (ca. 1890)

Montefiore Home for Chronic Invalids (now, Montefiore Medical Center) was an American sanatorium charity hospital. Founded in 1884 in Manhattan, New York at Avenue A and 84th Street, the sanatorium relocated to a larger building in Manhattan on 138th Street before removing to The Bronx in 1910. It also changed names several times.

The sanatorium afforded medical treatment, food, and shelter to those unfortunates who, by reason of the incurability of their diseases, were refused admission in hospitals and asylums. It received all incurables, irrespective of creed and nationality. The institution was founded and maintained mainly by Jewish munificence. The organization also managed the Montefiore Home Country Sanitarium in Bedford Hills, Westchester County, New York, where it sent patients who were fit for a more active environment.

== Avenue A and 84th Street, Manhattan (1884-1888) ==
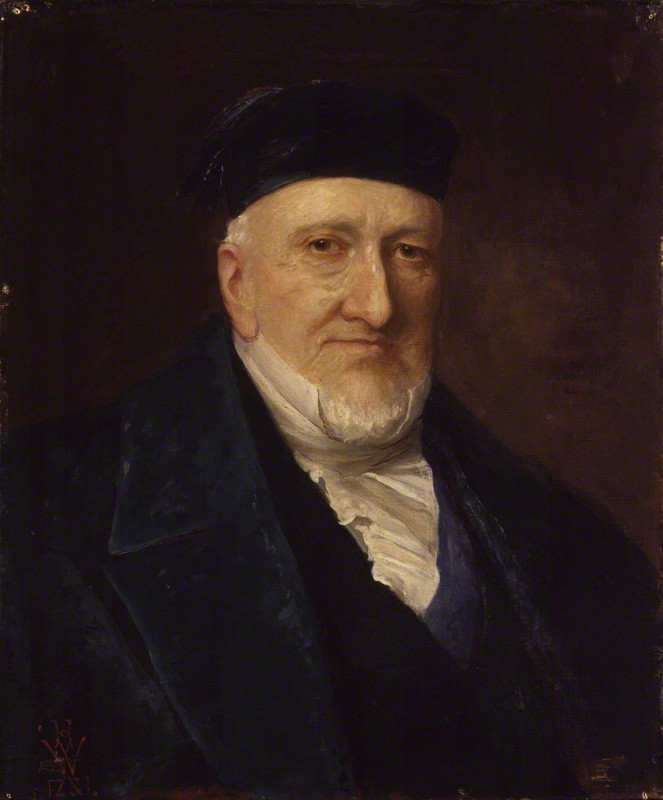
Sir Moses Montefiore painted in 1881

The idea of Montefiore hospital arose from a series of meetings held in early 1884 among representatives of New York City's synagogues, convened by Dr. Henry Pereira Mendes, to honor Sir Moses Montefiore on his forthcoming one-hundredth birthday. Out of these meetings, held in the rooms of Congregation Shearith Israel, the Montefiore Home for Chronic Invalids was established in Manhattan at East 84th Street. Jewish residents of New York City subscribed liberally.

The sanatorium was incorporated on April 21, 1884, under the name of the "Montefiore Home, a Hospital for chronic Invalids". It accepted its first six patients on October 24, 1884, Moses Montefiore's birthday, and was consecrated as a home for chronic invalids on October 26, 1884.

The patients were of the class received in the city hospitals, but who were discharged from them after being treated from three to nine weeks. At the Home, it was proposed to keep them until they recovered or died. On the day that the institution opened in 1884, six in-patients were accepted and already, the applications exceeded capacity. The Superintendent of the home was Dr. Senff, and the Matron, Miss Hatel.

=== Architecture and fittings ===
The three-story residence on Avenue A and 84th Street had been remodeled and newly decorated throughout. There were eight wards in the original building, which stood well back from the street and was free from the noise of passing vehicles. There was accommodation for 25 or 30 chronically ill patients.

A life-size crayon portrait of Sir Moses Montefiore was hung in the reception room. The philanthropist after whom the home was named was the first contributor to the home.

== Broadway and West 138th Street, Manhattan (1888-1910) ==
After growing out of its original building, a new hospital was built in 1887 and the move uptown to Broadway and West 138th Street occurred in the following year. It was not entirely devoted to "consumptives" (tuberculosis patients) but had two wards with 30 beds each for male patients and one ward of 42 beds for female patients. It was primarily intended for those who are poor but were not suitable for treatment in hospitals owing to the chronic nature of their ailments. Consumptives who were admitted could be of any religion and could stay at the Home for the rest of their lives. Some who recovered their ability to work left of their own accord, or were (if men) sent to the Montefiore Home Country Sanitarium in Bedford Hills, Westchester County, New York.

The Home maintained a free dispensary, water cure and electrical system for outdoor patients. For disinfection, carbolic acid was liberally used. Linen was disinfected in a dry hot air disinfector. Handkerchiefs were not allowed. The rooms were periodically fumigated and repainted. The douche was used; cod liver oil and maltine were liberally given as well as creosote in small doses.

The male wards had two nurses each, the female ward had three nurses. There were three resident medical officers, including Dr. Joseph Fränkel. Twenty-three other physicians professionally visited the institution. During 1897, 158 were admitted and 493 treated, 189 being for phthisis. The average of admissions for the previous five years was 241.

In 1901, the institution was renamed "Montefiore Hospital for Chronic Diseases".

The families of those in the Home, or of those otherwise under treatment, if they were deprived of the labor of the breadwinner of the family, were supported by the "Julius Hallgarten Fund", the income of which was devoted to that purpose. Patients who left the Home in an improved or cured condition were relieved from the Discharged Patients' Fund. The institution was controlled by a Board of 24 Directors. It was supported by subscriptions of donors, patrons, and members, and by voluntary donations and bequests.

=== Architecture and fittings ===
The new hospital was located about 300 yards (270 m) from the Hudson River. Attached to the home was a park with large tents for use during rainy or windy weather. For weaker patients, broad piazzas were available. The home itself was of red brick and granite in Italian style with a central block and two projecting wings, which together enclosed an open courtyard. The center was on five floors, including the attics, and the wings were on four floors. In the rear between the two wings were the kitchen and laundry, the dining room for 300 being over them, and accessible from the main hall in the center building. In addition to the wards, there were bedrooms for from two to sixteen patients mostly to the south, very few to the west and north. The larger bedrooms (eight to sixteen beds) had six to ten windows on the north, east, and south. There were also two very large sun rooms mainly for the winter months, a smoking room, and a large synagogue. The rooms were painted with light-colored oil paint and had rounded angles. The heating was by steam; the lighting was by gas and electric light; the ventilation was said to be good. Sewage went into the Hudson River. The water supply was from the city supplies.

== The Bronx (1910-present) ==
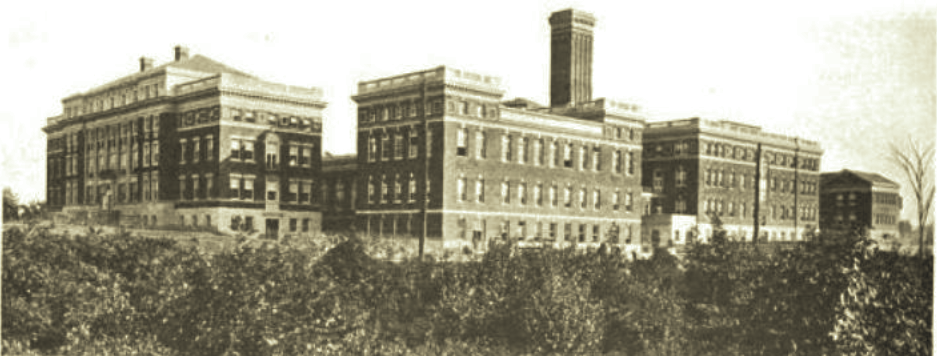
General view looking southeast (The Bronx, 1913)

On February 10, 1910, the owners purchased a parcel of land situated in The Bronx. The four blocks covered 15 acres (6.1 ha). The parcel was bounded by 210th Street, Tryon Avenue, Gun Hill Road, and Steuben Avenue. The cost was US$750,000. The 8 acres (3.2 ha) building site plan called for a four-story building, with hospital equipment to accommodate 600 patients.

The Home laid the cornerstone for its new buildings on Gun Hill Road (East 210th Street) on October 27, 1912. The Mayor and Jacob H. Schiff, president of the Home, delivered tributes. Schiff announced that in addition to the present new buildings in the process of erection, subscriptions to the amount of US$200,000 had been secured for the erection of a pay pavilion, to accommodate such patients whose means did not allow them to secure nurse's attention at home, but could afford to pay a small amount for their care in an institution. The new Home would have the capacity for 200 inpatients more than the building in Manhattan, meaning that it would be able to accommodate about 700 patients. However, this would still not provide for all the applicants to the institution.

At this location, the sanitarium went through several name changes including "Montefiore Home, a Hospital for Chronic Invalids and Country Sanitarium for Consumptives" (1911), "Montefiore Home and Hospital for Chronic Diseases" (1914), and "Montefiore Hospital for Chronic Diseases" (1920). By the time it was renamed Montefiore Hospital and Medical Center (1964). it was no longer a sanitarium.

=== Architecture and fittings ===
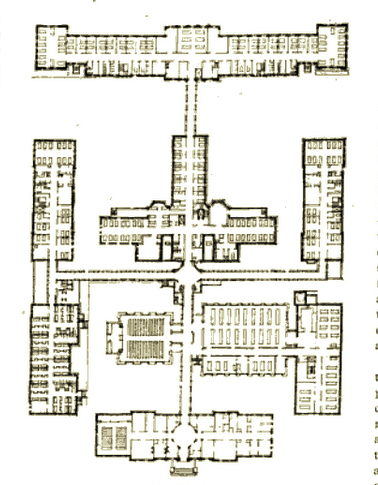
Floor plan

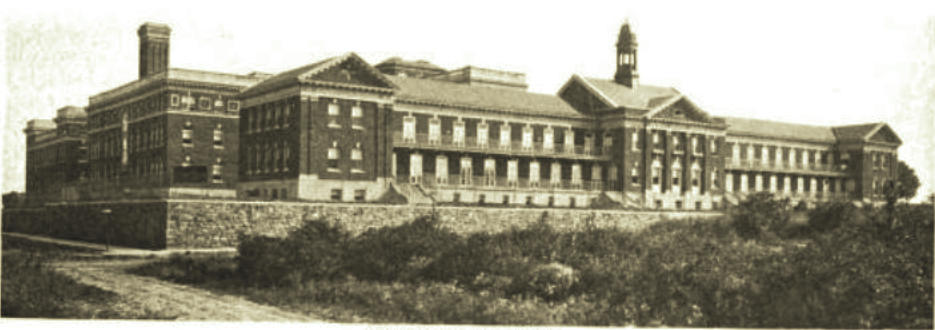
Tuberculosis pavilion (The Bronx, 1913)

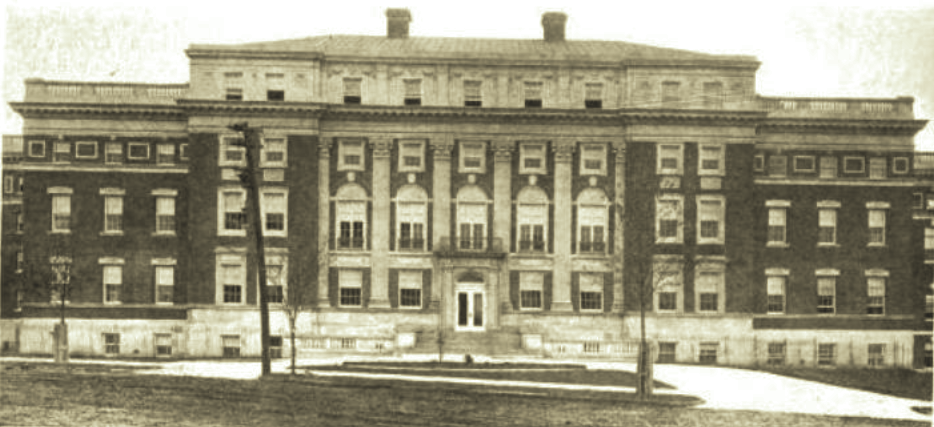
Administration building (The Bronx, 1913)

A number of very large buildings were placed in a comparatively restricted area without a semblance of congestion apparent in any part. The administration building faces the north with the tuberculosis hospital on the south and the other buildings occupying positions on either side, all connected with enclosed corridors for convenient service and administration. The group consists of either separate units: the administration building, the home, the dining hall and service wing, the synagogue, the tuberculosis hospital, the surgical and medical departments, and the employees' home.

The entire group is designed in the spirit of Georgian architecture. The administration building is considered the finest of the group. There is a singular absence of cold and forbidding institutional character in the design of this building. The main facade was conceived in a broad manner. The center of the group at the intersection of the main and transverse corridor is occupied by the home or dormitory pavilion, and in convenient proximity on either side of the main corridor are the synagogue and dining hall, directly in the rear of the building. This is an economic and convenient arrangement and the enclosed corridors make it comfortable for the patients who are not confined to their rooms to move about during inclement weather. The deck roofs of the corridors provide opportunities for the patients' outdoor exercise in pleasant weather.

The pavilion for the tuberculosis patients is entirely separate from the remainder of the group save for a connecting corridor for service. This building has a long southern frontage with very large windows opening onto balconies at each of the two floors extending on either side of the central pavilion to the end wings. This building completely provides for the treatment and housing of tuberculosis patients. The first floor contains a central dining room flanked, on either side, by wings containing private rooms for two patients each and at the ends by large terminal wards. The bedrooms and wards occupy the entire southern exposure, the north being utilized by bathrooms, service rooms, and the main corridor.

The buildings throughout are constructed of reinforced concrete columns and girders filled in with vitrified terracotta blocks above grade. All of the façades including those fronting on the courts are faced with a rough textured brick in various shades with the trim and decorative features executed in architectural terracotta of gray color in harmony with the brick.

The buildings are simply designed brick structures with the decorative features confined to the cornices, belt courses, and window lintels, with the exception of the administration building, which is given a lighter and more graceful appearance by its proportions and the use of finely modeled terra cotta for its decorative detail. The broad pilasters with their bold Corinthian capitals executed in this material are effective. The lunettes over the second-story windows as well as the festoons and panels in the attic story are well designed. They indicate in an effective manner the versatility of terra cotta for fine decorative purposes and show its special aptitude for reproducing the conceptions of the sculptor and modeler.

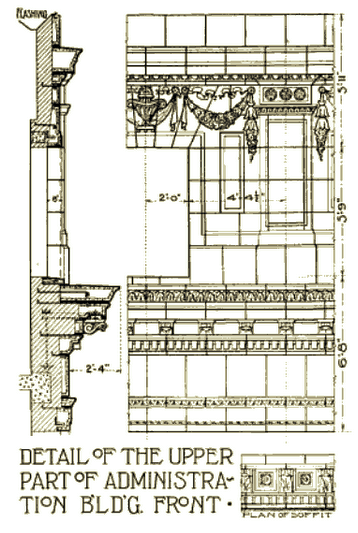

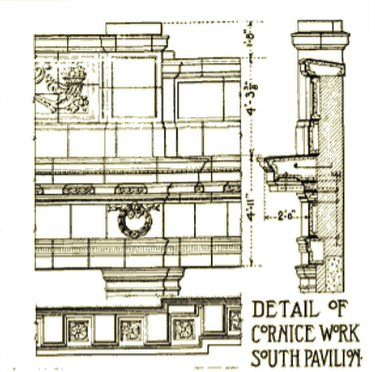

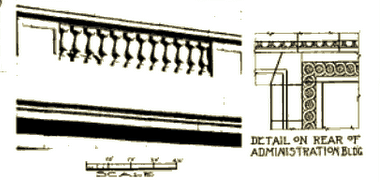

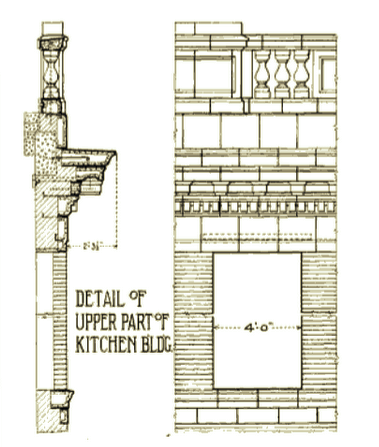

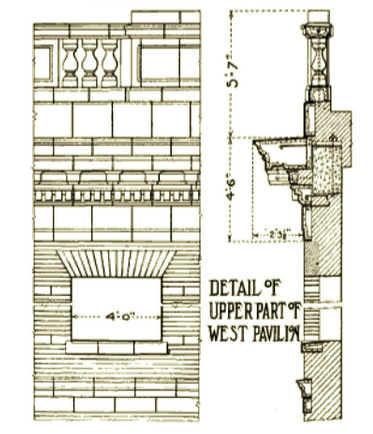

== Notable people ==
- David Leventritt
- Samuel D. Levy
- Henry Pereira Mendes
- Jacob Schiff

== See also ==
- List of sanatoria in the United States
