= Program for Jewish Genetic Health =

Coordinates: 40.891574°N 74.004164°W

- Formation: 2010
- Type: Non-profit organization
- Purpose: Preventative Health, Ethical Guidance
- Location: New York, New York
- Region served: United States of America
- Medical Director: Dr. Susan Klugman
- Staff: <10
- Volunteers: 5

The Program for Jewish Genetic Health is a centralized resource for the Jewish community, addressing all health concerns related to the medical genetics of the Jewish people. The Program's stated mission is to protect the health of the current Jewish community and its future generations. Launched in 2011, the Program for Jewish Genetic Health integrates the social mission they Montefiore Health System with the clinical services, genetic education, and biomedical advances of its medical school, the Albert Einstein College of Medicine.

The Program for Jewish Genetic Health has three main objectives:

1. to provide accessible and affordable options for carrier testing for Jewish genetic diseases
2. to increase awareness and disseminate timely information regarding all aspects of genetic health to lay and professional sectors of the Jewish community
3. to serve as a centralized resource and support center for Jewish genetic health and associated concerns from before birth through old age.

== Carrier testing for Jewish genetic diseases ==
About one in four Ashkenazi Jews carries a genetic alteration associated with a recessive "Jewish genetic disease." Many of these diseases have the potential to be severely debilitating and even fatal. A child must inherit altered genes for a given disease from both parents to have the disease. Genetic testing can identify individuals who themselves are asymptomatic carriers, but whose children may be at risk. Community-based screening for Tay–Sachs disease is considered by many to be one of the most successful public health initiatives in medical history. Although this has resulted in a near eradication of the disease from the Jewish population, the disease-causing genetic alterations still are present, and screening still is necessary in every generation.

Carrier screening for many Jewish genetic disorders has become standard of care. As technology advances, so does the number of disorders for which screening is available. In addition, studies suggest that consumers desire more reproductive genetic testing, particularly for diseases that will result in death by the age of 5.

In the traditional medical model, screening for Jewish genetic diseases usually is recommended by a woman's obstetrician/gynecologist once the woman is contemplating pregnancy or already pregnant. As an alternative model, community-based carrier screening programs have been established nationwide. In addition to spreading further awareness about genetic health issues, screening programs allow for carriers to be identified prior to pregnancy, and even prior to picking a future marriage partner. This enables them to have the largest number of options when considering their future families. Since health insurance policies do not universally cover the complete cost of this genetic testing, many screening programs rely on philanthropic dollars to ensure that no one is turned away due to financial barriers.

The Program for Jewish Genetic Health works with the Division of Reproductive Genetics at Montefiore Medical Center to screen individuals of child-bearing age in the New York metropolitan area. Screening appointments at Montefiore, which include private genetic counseling sessions, are open to the community, and subsidies are provided to those who are uninsured or under-insured.

== Increasing awareness ==
The Program for Jewish Genetic Health offers educational programs – both live and online – to various sectors of the community to educate them on Jewish genetic health issues, including the Ashkenazi Jewish link to breast and ovarian cancer, Parkinson's disease, and prostate cancer, as well as alternative family planning options such as pre-implantation genetic diagnosis.

In May 2013, the program launched the MyJewishGeneticHealth.com Online Educational Series to provide the Jewish community with effective and accessible learning via online webinars and supplemental materials. MyJewishGeneticHealth.com is composed of individual "lessons," based on their current relevance to Jewish genetic health issues, from diseases and conditions to related treatments and ethical issues.

Program leaders also present symposia to rabbis and other Jewish leaders to provide guidance on how genetics relates to engagement and marriage and how leadership can counsel congregants through potential and actually affected pregnancies, as well as to provide applicable referrals if necessary.

== Centralized resource ==
The Program for Jewish Genetic Health provides a place for Jews to be able to access resources relevant to Jewish genetic health issues and solutions, from clinical programs to support groups to educational material. The program staff consists of board-certified obstetricians and gynecologists, geneticists and genetic counselors who can provide guidance and answer questions about the relationship between once's Ashkenazi Jewish heritage and a host of medical conditions.
