= Montefiore Home Country Sanitarium =

Coordinates: 41°14′18″N 73°42′40″W

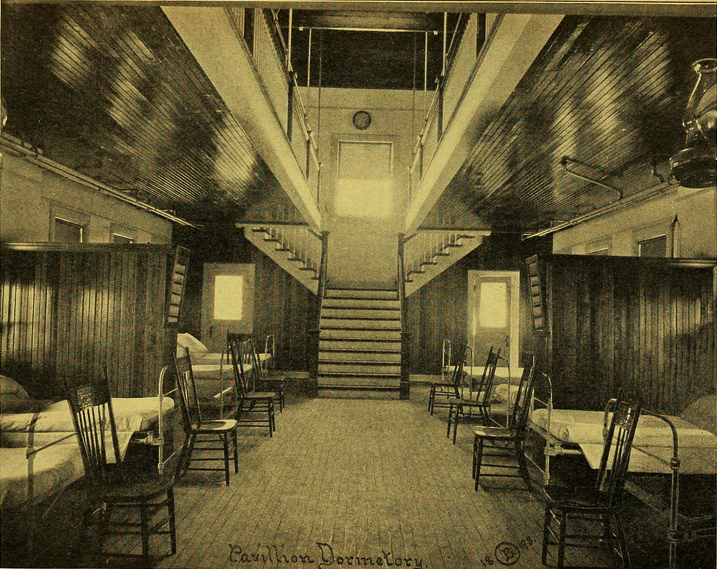
Patient dormitory

Montefiore Home Country Sanitarium was an American sanatorium located in Bedford Hills, Westchester County, New York. Opened in September 1897, it was under the same management as the Montefiore Home for Chronic Invalids at Manhattan, New York. The country sanitarium was situated in a sheltered situation on the Berkshire Hills, at an elevation of about 450 feet (140 m), and was 60 miles (97 km) from New York City or one and a half hours by rail.

== Establishment ==
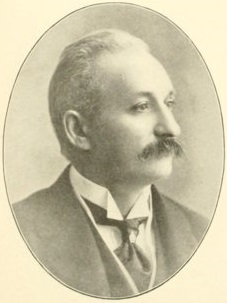
Lyman Bloomingdale

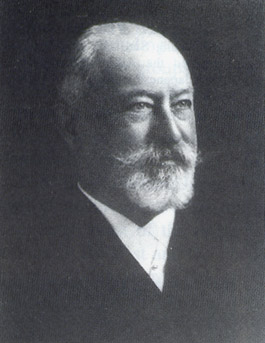
Jacob Schiff

The Country Sanitarium came into existence as a result of the repeated observations that the proportion of consumptives among the sufferers treated in the Montefiore Home for Chronic Invalids was very large. In 1895, the project was started by Lyman Bloomingdale and heartily supported by Jacob Schiff.

Established with beds for ten patients, it was enlarged in May 1898, to accommodate 40 with the hope of further extending the number of beds to 60. The two buildings were frame houses, one of which had a large veranda. There was also a good bathroom and heating with hot water. Originally a farm, the grounds covered 136 acres (55 ha) of land. Patients were sent there who were able to do a little light work, with the object of ultimately making the sanatorium self-supporting. It had already begun to supply the Home in Manhattan with fruit and vegetables and dairy produce. Nearly all the patients were consumptives in an early stage, but a few were sufferers from asthma or neurasthenia. Only men were admitted, and no charge of any kind was made. There were no house physicians, but one of the visiting physicians of the Home in New York attended once a week, and more frequently if called through the telephone.

The first annual report showed that 57 patients had been treated, of whom five were cured, eight were left in an improved condition, and 15 were transferred to the Montefiore Home for Chronic Invalids in Manhattan, as their advanced condition of phthisis became detrimental to the surrounding incipient cases; and 29 cases remained in the sanatorium at the time the report was finished.

It was exclusively for the consumptive poor, who were selected from the applicants for admission to the Montefiore Home for Chronic Invalids. The house physician of the institution was Dr. Herbert; the medical director, Dr. Joseph Fraenkel. It was the plan of the founders to add to the existing buildings some smaller cottages with separate rooms, more suitable for the care of tuberculous patients than the original large pavilion, which consisted only of a large dormitory.

== Enlargement ==
It was successively enlarged to accommodate 160 beds, at a total cost of US$200,000, the largest addition having been completed in 1901. Memorial Day, 1901, was the opening day of the new building of this institution. The enlarged building consisted of four pavilions and an administration block, united to the north by a corridor 99 meters (325 ft) long, somewhat after the style of the Massachusetts State Sanitarium. The two inner and the two outer pavilions corresponded respectively, the outer being 44 by 97 meters (144 ft × 318 ft), while the inner measured 38 by 8 meters (125 ft × 26 ft). The administration block was placed symmetrically between them but a little further north. Each pavilion has two floors and a basement. The outer pavilions had on the first floor each 20 beds in 12 rooms, and on the second floor, each a ward with 24 beds. The inner pavilions had wards with 18 beds on each floor. There was a sunroom at the southern end of each pavilion with 10 large windows and large verandas with southerly and northerly aspects. Each pavilion had its own closets, bathrooms, lavatories, store room, nurses' room, and cloakroom. The first and second pavilions were for men, the third for children over 14 years of age, and the fourth for women. The floors were of polished hardwood, with rounded angles, except in the closets, store rooms, and kitchen, where they were of mosaic tile. The administration block had a basement, containing a laboratory, morgue, cloak rooms, lavatory and bathrooms, and two upper floors. On the first floor were reading and dining rooms for patients, reception rooms, offices, and dining rooms for the medical officers and staff. The kitchen department was behind. On the second floor were the quarters of medical officers, matron, and secretary. There was also an operation room. Behind the administrative block was the engine house, and further on the boiler house with crematorium, laundry, steriliser, and dwellings for the male housekeepers. The place was lit with electricity, and heated by steam pipes. It got its water supply was from an artesian well 400 feet (120 m) deep, and had a storage tank of 32,000 US gallons (120,000 L; 27,000 imp gal) of water.

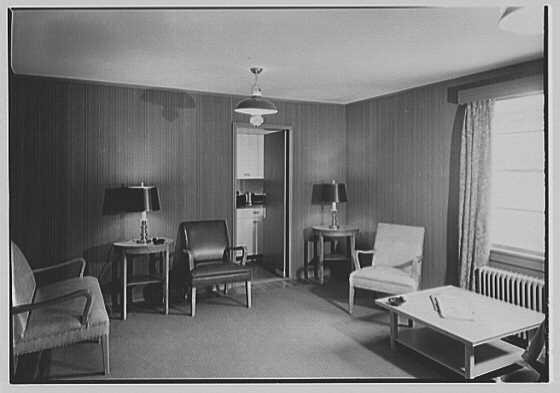
Nurses' home, Montefiore Country Sanatorium (1949)

The staff included a resident medical officer, two assistants, and visiting staff in New York.

Patients, who were admitted regardless of race, creed, or nationality, did a little light work in the sanatorium when fit for it. There was no limit to the length of their stay, except from medical considerations.

In May 1901, new buildings were opened. The construction of the buildings was supervised by Dr. Sigard Adolphus Knopf. Efforts were made to confine the number of patients to those in the incipient stages of the disease, although no extreme line was drawn. On September 1, 1903, there were 160 patients in the sanitarium, with room for 162. Partially cured patients were constantly being sent home from the sanitarium, and this explains the fact that the institution was not filled to its very limit.

== See also ==
- List of sanatoria in the United States
