= Blythedale Children's Hospital =

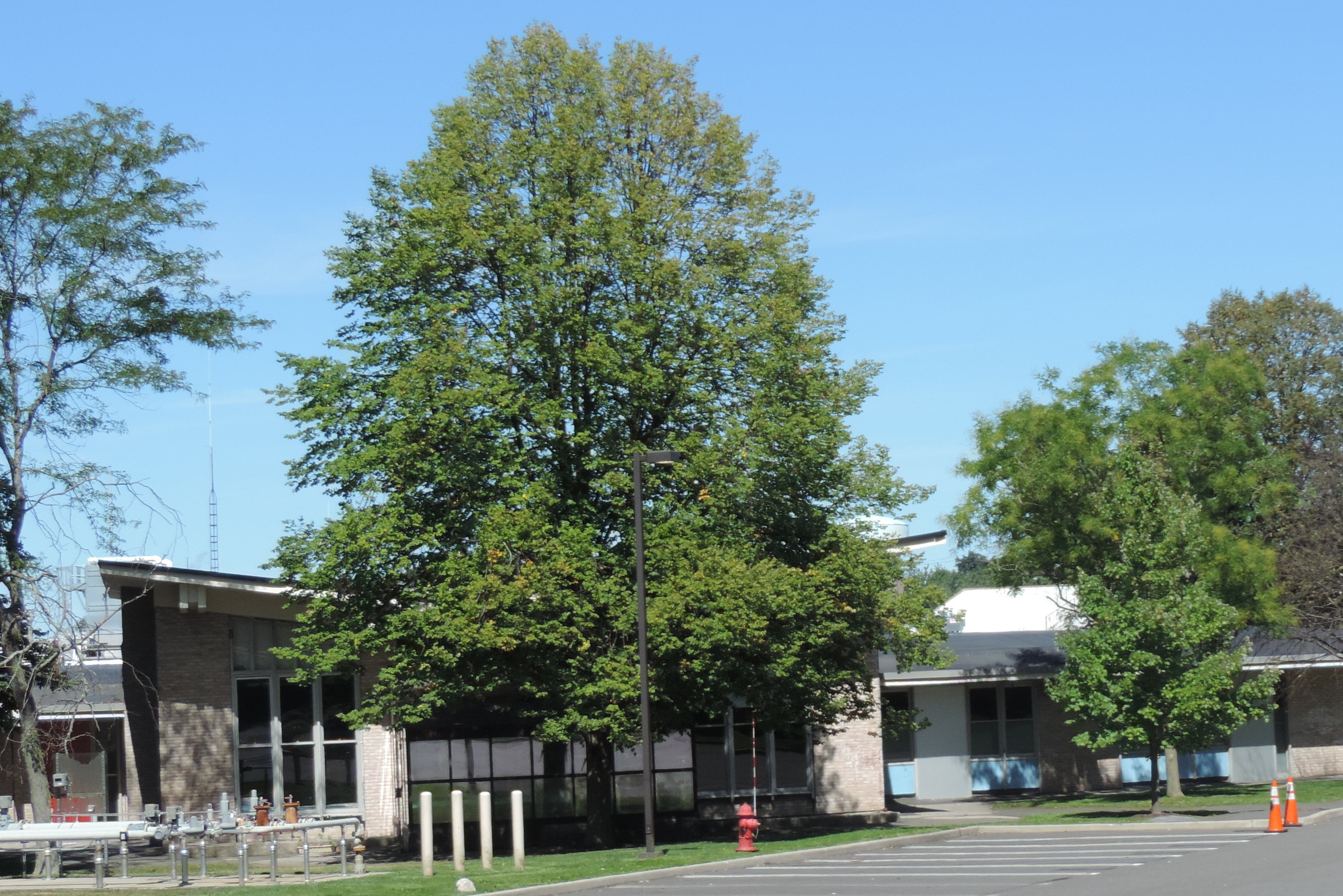

Geography
- Location: Valhalla, Westchester County, New York, United States
- Coordinates: 41°4′28″N 73°48′0″W

Organization
- Type: Specialist

Services
- Beds: 94
- Speciality: Children's hospital

History
- Founded: Year-round operation in 1913; Present location in 1922

Links
- Website: http://www.blythedale.org/
- Lists: Hospitals in New York State

Blythedale Children's Hospital is a specialty children's hospital in Valhalla, New York, United States. It is the only independent children's hospital in New York State. The hospital is dedicated to the diagnosis, care and rehabilitation of children with complex medical and rehabilitative needs. The hospital opened a new, 56,000 square-foot inpatient hospital in December 2011. The new inpatient facility accommodates 94 patients in single or double rooms and includes a 46-bed Infant & Toddler and Post Neonatal/Post-Pediatric Intensive Care Unit for medically fragile patients, many of whom require weaning from mechanical ventilation. The new building also includes a 30-bed Pediatric & Adolescent Unit, and an (expanded, 2021) 18-bed Traumatic Brain Injury Unit.

The hospital also has its own on-site public school district, the Mount Pleasant Blythedale Union Free School District.
