= Children's Hospital at Montefiore =

The Children's Hospital at Montefiore
- Montefiore Medical Center

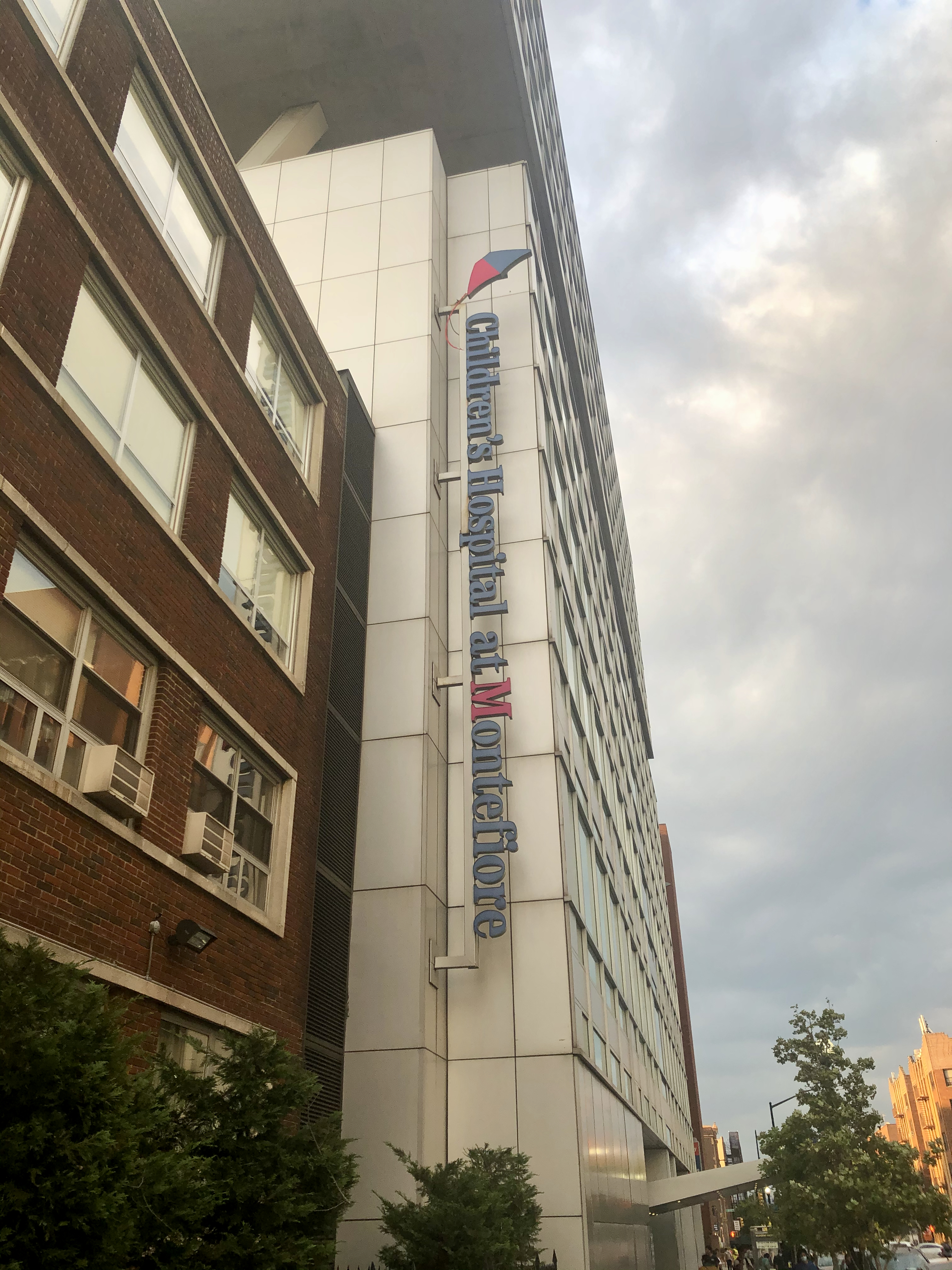
- The Children's Hospital at Montefiore

Geography
- Location: 3415 Bainbridge Avenue, The Bronx, New York, United States
- Coordinates: 40.880416°N 73.878922°W

Organization
- Care system: Private
- Type: Teaching
- Affiliated university: Albert Einstein College of Medicine
- Network: Montefiore Health System

Services
- Emergency department: Pediatric
- Beds: 193
- Speciality: Children's hospital

History
- Constructed: 1998
- Opened: 2001

Links
- Website: www.cham.org
- Lists: Hospitals in New York State
- Other links: Hospitals in The Bronx

The Children's Hospital at Montefiore (CHAM) is a nationally ranked pediatric acute care children's teaching hospital located in the Bronx, New York. The hospital has 193 pediatric beds and is affiliated with the Albert Einstein College of Medicine. The hospital is a member of the Montefiore health network and is the only children's hospital in the network. The hospital provides comprehensive pediatric specialties and subspecialties to infants, children, teens, and young adults aged 0–21 throughout the Bronx and New York state. Children's Hospital at Montefiore also sometimes treats adults that require pediatric care. While CHAM does have a pediatric emergency department, they do not have a pediatric trauma center and sends all pediatric trauma cases to the nearby Jacobi Medical Center's level II pediatric trauma center. The Children's Hospital at Montefiore is one of the largest providers of pediatric health services in New York state. The hospital is attached to Montefiore Medical Center and is affiliated with the Ronald McDonald House of New York.

== History ==
Historically, healthcare for children in the Bronx was handled through pediatric units within adult hospitals. In the late 1990s Montefiore Medical Center began raising money for the construction of a separate freestanding children's hospital for its pediatric population. In 1997, they announced the plan to create a new $100 million independent children's hospital adjacent to the main campus.

The hospital raised $82 million through private donations and Montefiore took out a $55 million bank loan to fund the new project.

The plan called for a 10-floor, 155,000 square foot building with separate dedicated pediatric units for critically ill children, infants, children, teens and young adults, including an 18-bed pediatric intensive care unit. Rooms at the hospital were also planned to be all private rooms. CHAM included many amenities not seen before at Montefiore's pediatric units including space themes throughout the hospital including space artifacts donated by NASA, playrooms, TV's, and private rooms with beds for parents.

The hospital opened in 2001 and was New York City's first major children's hospital built in decades.

In 2007 the hospital received a $12 million donation from the John L. Greene Foundation to fund an expansion of the pediatric oncology program at the hospital. The next year, the hospital used the donation to open up a new outpatient infusion unit with 11 infusion beds and 5 exam rooms.

In 2020 the hospital opened up its 40-bed 8th floor general pediatric unit to adults to help deal with the surge of adult SARS-Cov-2. Adults on the unit were treated by pediatric nurses and doctors during their stay. The process of the changeover from a pediatric unit to an adult unit was outlined in The Journal of Pediatrics. The hospital also expanded their pediatric emergency room age limit from 21 to 30.

In 2024, CHAM opened the first hospital-based, outpatient physical and occupational therapy gym in the Bronx for children aged three to eleven.

== About ==
The hospital features an AAP verified level III neonatal intensive care unit.

=== Patient care units ===
The hospital consists of several floors with patient care units. Some units include:

- 28 bed adolescent unit for patients 13-21
- 35 bed neonatal intensive care unit
- 26 bed pediatric intensive care unit
- 36 bed cardiology unit
- 17 bed pediatric emergency beds

=== Awards ===
As of 2021 Children's Hospital at Montefiore has placed nationally in 5 ranked pediatric specialties on U.S. News & World Report.

2021 U.S. News & World Report Rankings for Children's Hospital at Montefiore
Specialty	Rank (In the U.S.)	Score (Out of 100)
Neonatology	#19	83.5
Pediatric Gastroenterology & GI Surgery	#17	83.8
Pediatric Nephrology	#21	75.8
Pediatric Neurology & Neurosurgery	#47	70.7
Pediatric Urology	#48	64.7

== See also ==
- List of children's hospitals in the United States
- Children's hospital
- Montefiore Medical Center
- Albert Einstein College of Medicine
