= Blue Point =

Blue Point may refer to:

- Blue Point, New York
- Blue Point Brewing Company
- Blue point, a color pattern of some Asian cats (Thai, Siamese, Birman)
- Blue Point (building), an office skyscraper building in Warsaw, Poland
- Blue Point (horse) (born 2014), thoroughbred racehorse
- The eastern oyster (Crassostrea virginica), also called the bluepoint oyster (from Blue Point, New York)
- Bluepoint Games
- Literal translation of the electric equipment manufacturer Blaupunkt
- Blue-Point, a brand of tools by Snap-on
