= Sarah "Sadie" Savage =

Sarah Savage (1886–1968) was the head of the Victorian Order of Nurses in Preston, Ontario and created innovative "well-baby" clinics.

== Biography ==
Savage was born in Glasgow, Scotland in 1886 to William and Isabella J. Savage. Her family immigrated to Australia where she attended the Kangaroo Point Girls’ Private School in Brisbane. Her mother and younger sister died when Sarah was a young girl, and the remaining family moved to Newtownards, Northern Ireland in 1906. They later emigrated again to Preston, Ontario where Sarah attended the Toronto Western Hospital School of Nursing, and went on to complete postgraduate work at the Fordham Hospital in New York City focusing on tuberculosis and public health. Her first nursing practicum was at the Royal Jubilee Hospital in Victoria, British Columbia. In 1921, Sarah returned to Preston as the nurse in charge of the local branch of the Victorian Order of Nurses. She was a forerunner of the well-baby clinic concept. This was an initiative that spread across North America. She also ran weekly conferences for mothers and preschool-aged children with her sister Annie (also a VON). Throughout their time as VON nurses in Preston, they delivered about 2000 babies in a time when most births happened at home.

Miss Savage was honoured for her public health nursing service with the Jubilee Medal by King George VI. She retired from the VON in 1952 but continued to practise private nursing. She was a life member of the British Columbia Nurses' Association and a member of the Ontario Provincial Nursing Association. She was also a member of the St. John's Anglican Church, and the South Waterloo Progressive Conservative Association.

Savage died on September 5, 1968, at the age of 81 and was buried at Preston Cemetery.
