= Patchogue-Medford Library =

Library in Suffolk County, New York, USA

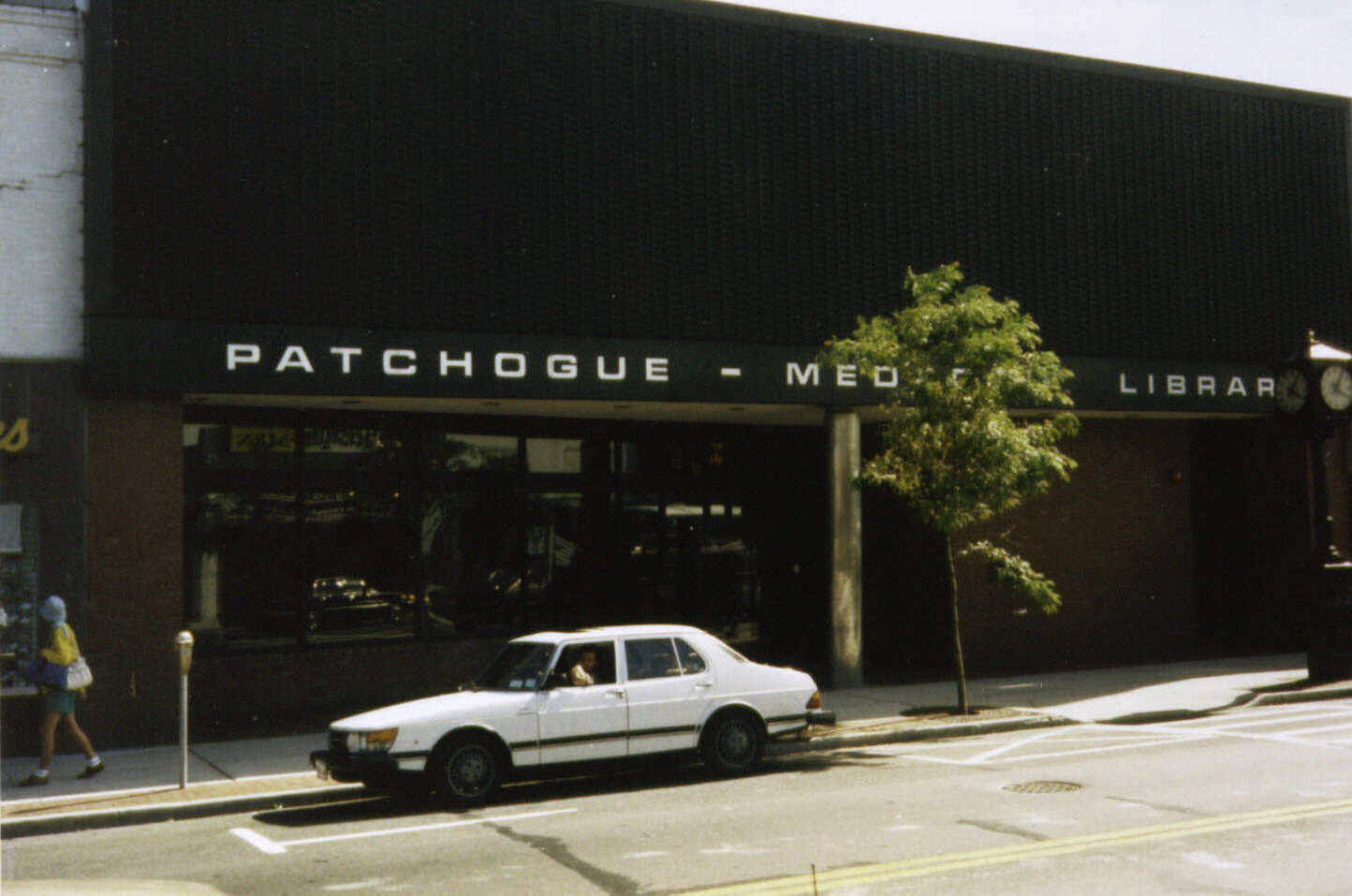
- 40.76543°N 73.01362°W
- Location: 54-60 East Main Street. Patchogue, New York 11772
- Type: Public
- Established: 1883

Other information
- Director: Danielle Paisley
- Website: www.pmlib.org

The Patchogue-Medford Library is a public library located in Suffolk County, New York and serves the residents who live within the Patchogue-Medford School District. It is a school district library but also serves as the central library for all of Suffolk County. It is located at 54-60 East Main Street in Patchogue, New York.

== History ==
The Patchogue Library Association (PLA) was formed in 1883 with the aim of establishing a library for Patchogue residents. Membership in the association was set at $5 and gave voting and borrowing privileges. On June 12, 1883, the association elected a board of trustees, approved a constitution and by-laws, and made plans for establishing the library. Dr. John Joseph Craven was elected as president, a position he would hold until his death a decade later.

A location for the library was found in July, in the back room of Overton’s Shoe Store, with Floyd Overton serving as de facto librarian. In August 1883, the library was formally dedicated at the First Congregational Church of Patchogue.

The library moved frequently over the next seventeen years, alternately being housed in a stationery store, music store, and the New Lyceum theatre, along with other locations. For the remainder of its existence, the Patchogue Library Association worked at fundraising and finding the library a more permanent home.

Financial difficulties, infrequent board meetings, a lack of facilities, and a precipitous drop in subscribers lead the eventual close of the PLA. It held its final meeting on October 28, 1899, and the proposal was made that an outside group should take charge of the library and shepherd its transition into a new organizational form was accepted.

=== Charter ===
In 1899, the Patchogue chapter of Sorosis, a women’s suffrage organization, took control of the library collection, and moved it to their club building. It was the aim of Sorosis to change the library from an association library to a public library, arrange a new system of library funding (from membership dues to local budget votes), and provide the library a permanent home. Under the care of the organization, a 1500-book demonstration public library was created and opened for public use.

In August 1900, at a school district board meeting, a public vote officially established a new Patchogue Library, and elected its first board of trustees. When the board met the next day, officers were elected and Elizabeth Mott Smith became the first president.

Following an inspection by the State Library, the Board of Regents granted Patchogue Library a state charter of incorporation in December 1900.

=== Carnegie Library ===
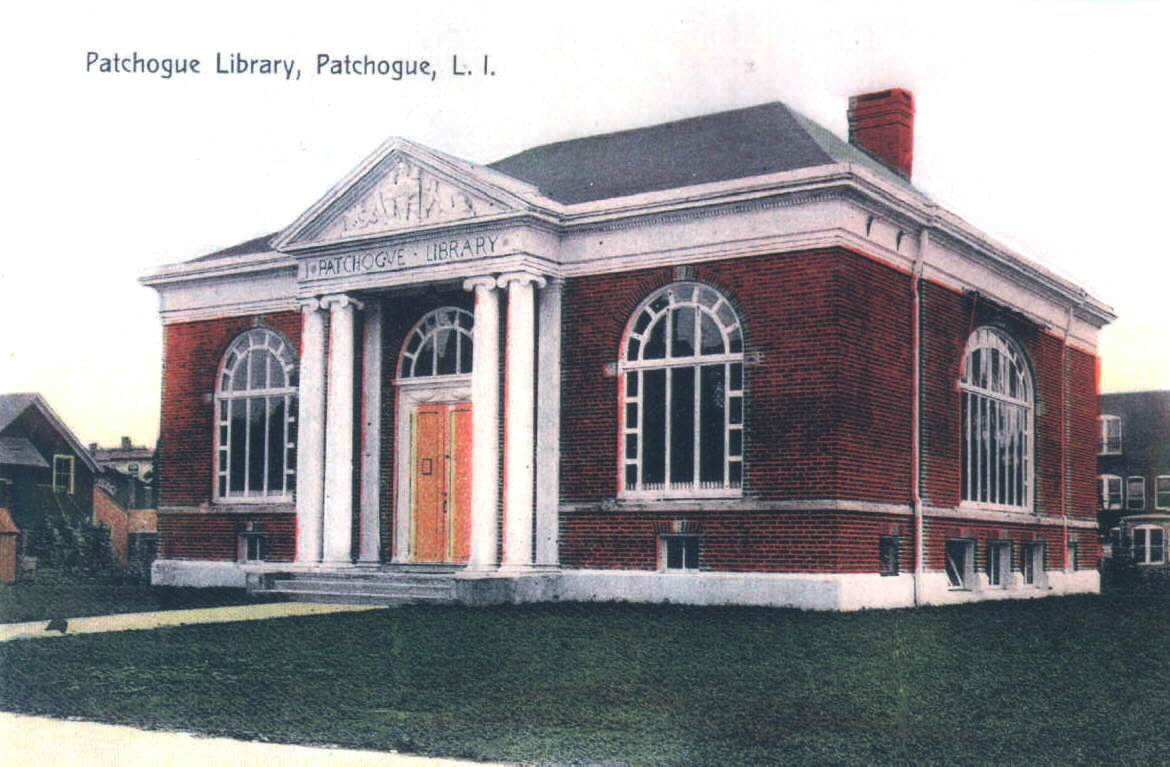
Carnegie Library postcard

On its annual budget meeting on August 1, 1905, the school board unanimously agreed to fund the library at $1,000 a year. A lot at 10 Lake Street, a gift from Edwin Bailey, Sr., was used as the building site.

Later that year, Carnegie granted the Library Board the funds for construction. In 1907, the construction contract was assigned to John V. Van Pelt of Manhattan. After under-budgeting the cost of construction, Van Pelt went to Carnegie for additional funds. Carnegie reluctantly agreed to provide the funds, as long as the approved maintenance cost, to be paid by the village, could be raised as well.

On Tuesday, August 4, 1908, the school board approved an additional $500 in maintenance costs a year for the library, raising the total annual support provided the village to $1,500. Carnegie gave an additional five thousand dollars, which was used to reimburse Van Pelt and the village of Patchogue for expenditures.

On March 4, 1908 Patchogue's Carnegie Library was formally dedicated. H. Allen Tenney, Library Building and Committee Chairman, and George D. Gerard, Head of the Board of Education, along with a number of other guests, spoke on the occasion.

Carnegie himself was invited to speak at the dedication, but declined. Instead David A. Boody, former mayor of Brooklyn and president of the Brooklyn Public Library Trustees, was sent as a Carnegie representative and gave the dedication address.

=== Central Library ===
In 1961, the Suffolk Cooperative Library System (SCLS) was created as one of twenty-three public library systems providing services to 740 public libraries throughout New York State. For the first 10 years of its existence, SCLS operated out of the basement of the Patchogue-Medford Library.

In 1978, Patchogue-Medford Library became the New York State-designated Central Library for Suffolk County. In this capacity, the Patchogue-Medford library supplies system-wide reference and collection evaluation services, interlibrary loan, collection services, tours and visits, and workshops, along with access to databases.

=== Modern period ===
A population explosion and the continued growth of the library collection in the aftermath of World War II meant that the library facilities would soon need to expand. An addition was added to the Carnegie building for additional space, but would soon be outgrown.

In 1951 service was officially extended to Medford residents after the Patchogue and Medford School districts were combined. In 1973, the Patchogue Library officially changed its name to the Patchogue-Medford Library by state charter amendment.

After 73 years at the Carnegie building, the library moved to a former W.T. Grants department store on East Main Street in 1981 to accommodate growing its collections and services. The nature and range of electronic resources and services have been steadily expanding and changing, ever since the computer revolution of the 1980s.

In 1993, the Neighborhood Center was opened at the Eagle Elementary School, which provides a quiet study place and a large collection of adult and children's fiction to service to the residents of Medford. In 2000, the library celebrated its first 100 years under state charter, a fact noted in a commemorative article in the New York Times.

== Importance ==
=== Cultural impact ===
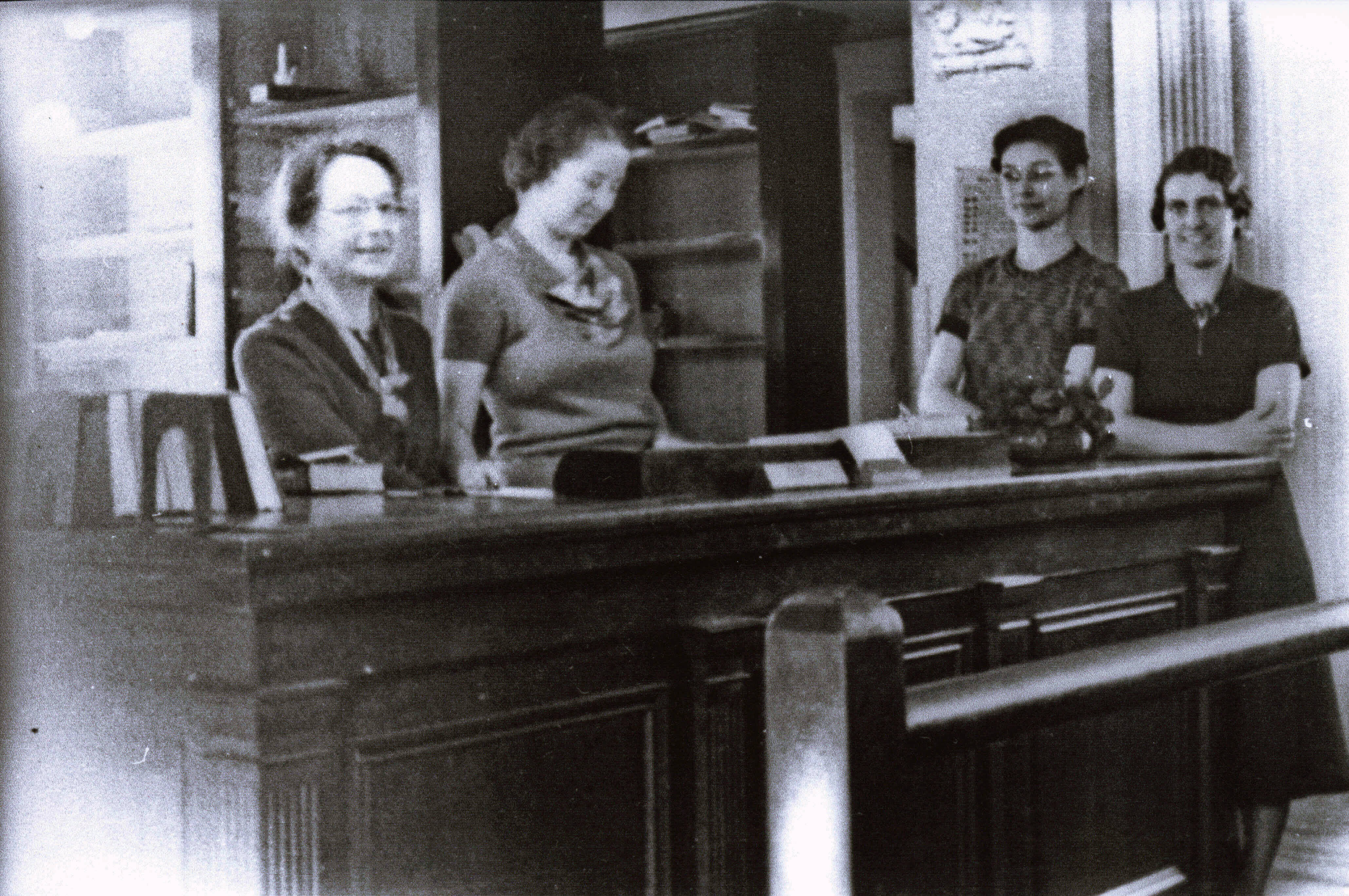
Head librarian Alma Custead and her staff at the reference desk.

Alma Custead served as librarian from 1914 to 1945. She expanded adult and children’s collections and services as well as creating a comprehensive catalog for Suffolk County libraries which was housed at the Patchogue library.

Custead regularly wrote bibliographies and articles for local newspapers, began services for young adults when such services were still considered experimental, and brought together librarians from around the county in the late 1920s and early 1930s to found the Suffolk County Library Association. She served as its first president, and launched state and countywide library conferences held in Patchogue, which supported local businesses.

Custead headed a local book drive to support American troops in World War I, and a county book drive in World War II. In the Great Depression and road to World War II, the library featured business, self-help, and job-related books and works on the growing crisis in international affairs.

During World War II, she created the first countywide Union Catalog (multiple library holdings) in Suffolk, and saw to it that it was based at Patchogue Library.

She established the library as a center of county library affairs, setting the stage for future developments. She also supervised much needed repairs to the library.

=== Carnegie Library renovation ===
Patchogue's Carnegie Library was the first of only two ever built in Suffolk County. The original building (50 feet 6 inches by 45 feet 9 inches) was approximately 2,300 square feet in size and was designed by John Vredenburgh Van Pelt in the neoclassical style. It was in use until 1981 when the then Patchogue-Medford Library relocated to Main Street in Patchogue. The building was the home of Briarcliffe College for a number of years.

Today the renovation is complete as the Carnegie Library has been moved to its permanent location next to the Suffolk County 6th District Court on Main Street. The Young Adult Department has moved from the main building into the Carnegie Building and now operates as the Teen Center at Patchogue-Medford Carnegie Library.

The move has allowed the Young Adult department to improve its services to teens while expanding already existing services such as reading clubs, homework help, crafts, expanded book collection, etc.
