= Stanów Zjednoczonych Avenue, Warsaw =

Street in Warsaw

Stanów Zjednoczonych Avenue
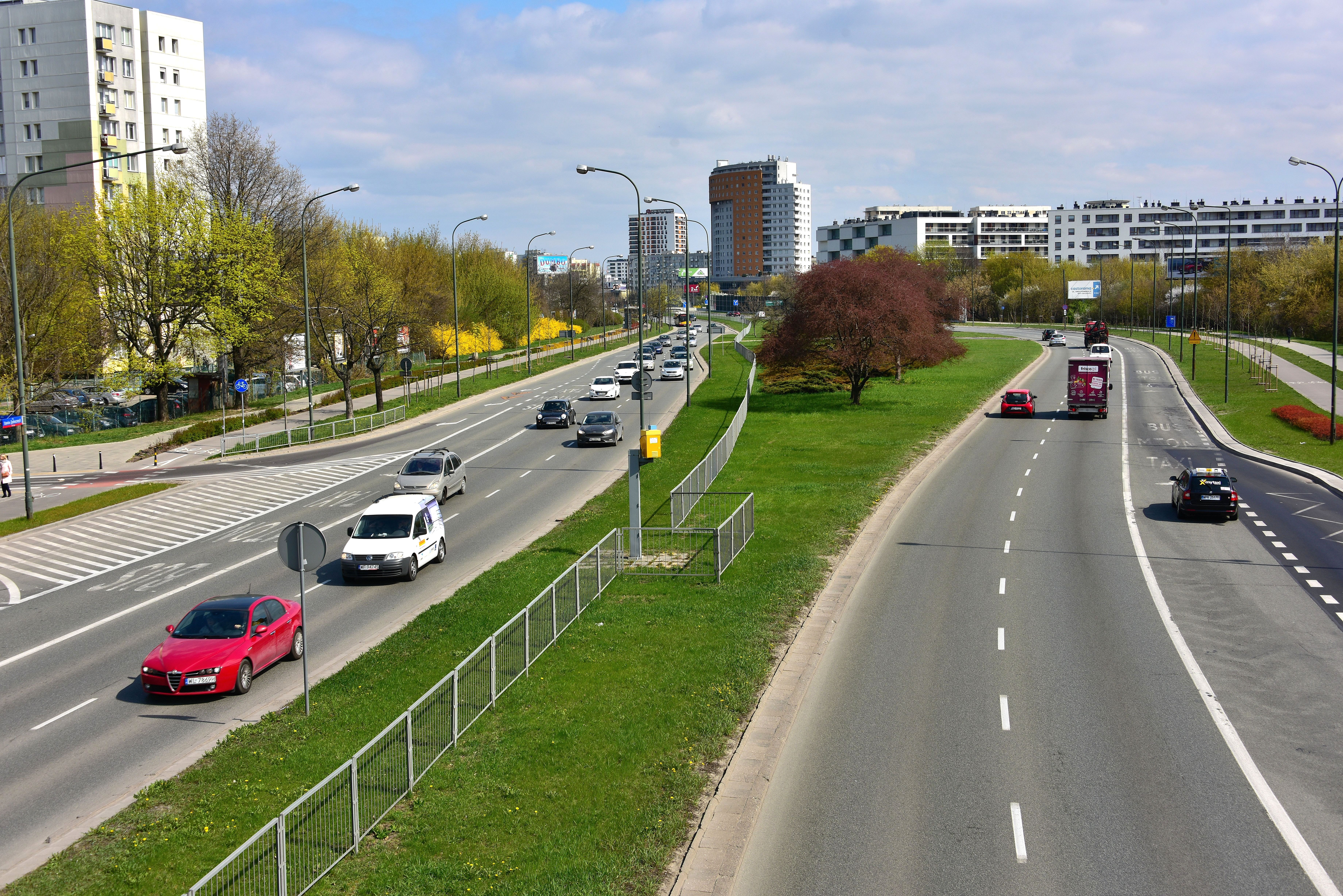
- Stanów Zjednoczonych Avenue near the intersection with Międzynarodowa Street, in 2019.
- Interactive map of Stanów Zjednoczonych Avenue
- Location: Praga-Południe, Warsaw, Poland

Stanów Zjednoczonych Avenue (Note: Polish: Aleja Stanów Zjednoczonych, literally: United States Avenue) is a street in the city of Warsaw, Poland, in the district of Praga-Południe. It stretches from the Łazienkowski Bridge to Wiatraczna Roundabout, and is part of the Łazienkowska Thoroughfare.

== Name ==
The road is named after the United States, which in Polish is known as Stany Zjednoczone.

== Layout and characteristics ==
It is a dual carriageway with each side having three lanes. Both sides are separated by a strip of greenery. On both sides of the road are located bike paths.

The road has the status of a county road. Its portion from the Łazienkowski Bridge to Ostrobramska Street had the designation number 5527W. The rest of the road does not have such designations. It is a part of the Łazienkowska Thoroughfare.

== History ==
Stanów Zjednoczonych Avenue was built in the 1920s, ending at Saska Street. In 1974, it was extended to Wiatraczna Roundabout on one end, and to Łazienkowski Bridge on the other.

From the 1970s to 1985, the portion of the road from the Łazienkowski Bridge to Ostrobramska Street was part of the international road E8. From 1985 to 2013, it was part of the national road 2 and the European route E30.

In 2015, on both sides of the road were built bike paths.

== Notable objects near the road ==
- Stefan Starzyński Monument
- Wystawowy Canal
- Gocław Lake
- Blue Point
- Church of the Mother of God, Queen of Polish Martyrs
- Signal Schools Complex
