= Suffolk Cooperative Library System =

Coordinates: 40.78884°N 72.96104°W

The Suffolk Cooperative Library System (SCLS) is a public library system, providing services to public libraries in Suffolk County, New York, United States. The system is governed by a nine-member board elected by trustees of member libraries.

== Mission ==
According to the mission statement, SCLS aims to provide "traditional and innovative public library service to all the people of Suffolk County." In 2010, SCLS introduced the Live-brary service, a "digital branch" with databases, historical newspapers, downloadable audio and ebooks, and other research tools available for patrons of member libraries.

== History ==
SCLS was established in 1961 and for the first 10 years of its existence operated out of the basement of the Patchogue-Medford Library.
