= Patchogue Theatre =

Patchogue Theatre for the Performing Arts
- Ward and Glynne’s Theatre
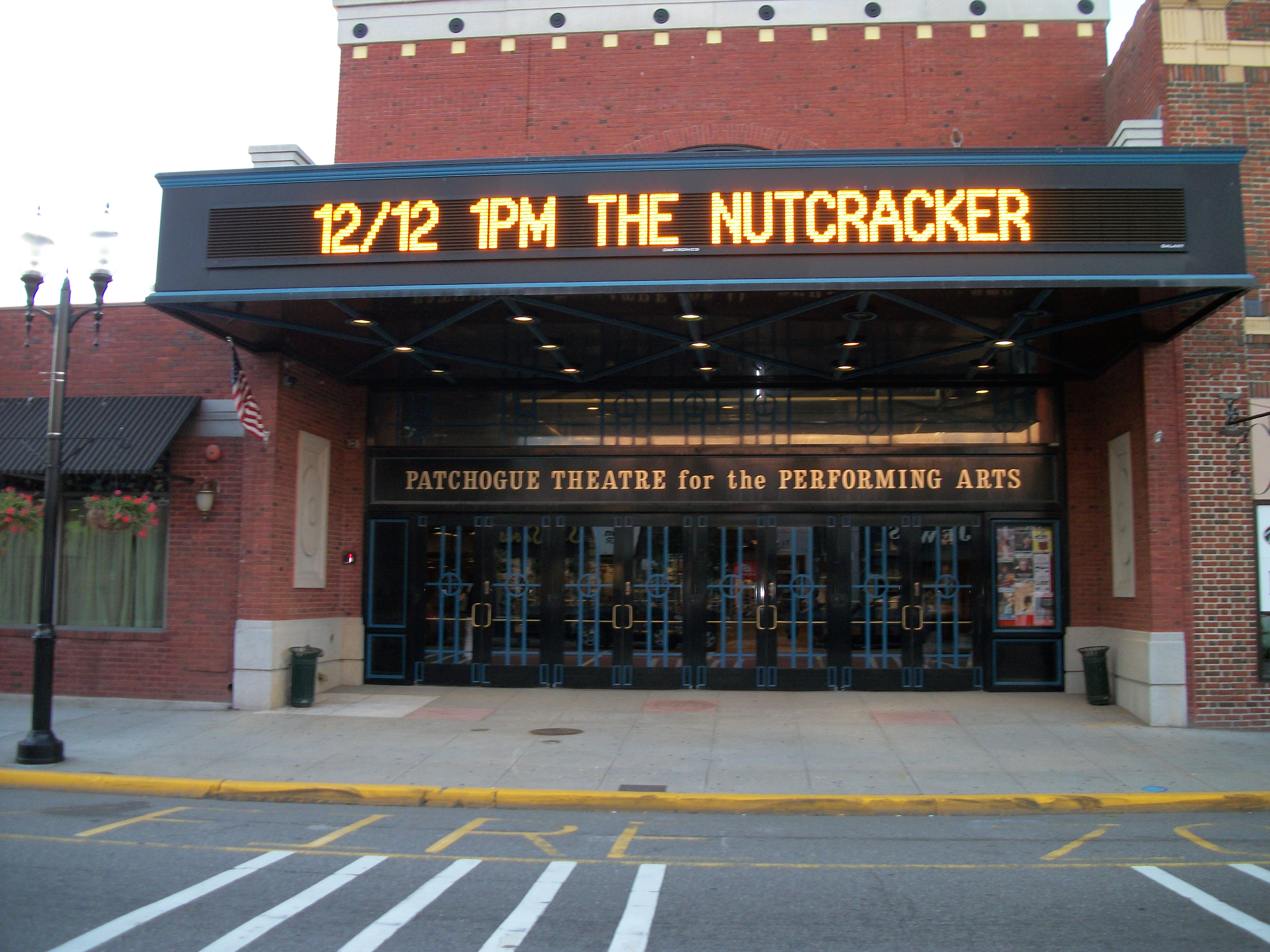
- The marquee for the Patchogue Theatre announces a show planned for six months ahead of when this picture was taken.
- Interactive map of Patchogue Theatre for the Performing Arts
- Address: 71 East Main Street; Patchogue, New York; United States
- Coordinates: 40°45′56.63″N 73°0′48.39″W
- Owner: Village of Patchogue
- Operator: Patchogue Village Center for the Performing Arts, Inc.
- Capacity: 1,200
- Type: Regional
- Current use: performing arts center

Website
- patchoguetheatre.org

Patchogue Theatre for the Performing Arts is Located at 71 East Main Street in Patchogue Village, Suffolk County, New York (nearest cross street, North Ocean Avenue).

The Patchogue Village Center for the Performing Arts, Inc., organized under a Not-for-Profit Corporation Law of the State of New York. This helps to manage The Patchogue Theatre for the Performing Arts in the public interest. The Center's mission is to have The Patchogue Theatre serve as a cultural center for Long Island. The Center showcases a broad spectrum of performing arts for the benefit of a wide-ranging audience at affordable prices.

The Patchogue Theatre as a full-time mixed-use venue, offering a variety of events including live performances, films, educational presentations, commercial productions, community forums, and other appropriate events.

== History ==
The Patchogue Theatre opened on May 23, 1923, as perhaps the largest and most magnificent theater on Long Island, Ward and Glynne’s theatre, as it was called then, was described as “palatial” and “magnificent in its interior decorations and appointments.” For the first half dozen years, the theatre hosted first-run feature films, Broadway productions, vaudeville and the best in burlesque. In 1929 the Theatre was sold to Prudential Theater Circuit and it remained a movie house for the next forty plus years. In 1958, a fire destroyed the lobby, so a new, much smaller lobby was built and three storefronts were added to the front of the building along Main Street.

In 1980, United Artists bought the building, and converted it to a three-theatre “Multiplex”. This was the beginning of the era that saw single screen theaters give way to more and more screens in one place. The conversion of the Patchogue Theatre into a triplex destroyed much of the interior as plaster columns were smashed, sheetrock and wallpaper were installed over the original walls, and new lower ceilings replaced the magnificent interior. Unfortunately, the theatre went out of business several years later and stood empty, forlorn, derelict and almost forgotten for over a decade.

In 1997, the Patchogue Village Board made the decision to purchase the theatre for the Village of Patchogue. Several local businessmen came up with the initial funds to purchase the theatre and the village applied for grants to renovate and restore the building to its former glory. The three empty storefronts were torn down. Where they stood, a brick walkway to the parking lots was built and a new building was constructed that is now a restaurant. The small theater lobby was replaced by a much larger one, featuring a mahogany bar and Art Deco style bathrooms. The old exterior brick was cleaned up and the new buildings had new brick fronts.

The theatre interior was restored to its 1923 grandeur in several phases as the theatre was open for business. The old seats were cleaned up and installed and the first performance was held in December 1998. The theatre was alternately open and closed for the next few years as renovations continued. Plasterers restored and repaired the plaster work on the auditorium walls, the columns were restored, tapestry wall fabric was installed, a new brass rail was placed at the edge of the balcony, and the original marble steps were cleaned up.

Period seats were obtained from Manhattan’s Imperial Theatre and were repainted and recovered. There are now 944 orchestra seats and 222 balcony seats; a total of 1166, plus two sections for disabled seating. By early 2001, the plaster and ceiling were painted and gilded, the new chandelier was hung and the restoration of the magnificent theater interior was complete.

Despite the old look of the theatre, the restoration added many modern amenities for the performers. 2,500 feet (760 m) of conduit was installed beneath the floor to bring 2000 amps of electrical power into the building. 60,000 pounds of steel were installed on the stage to be able to support up to 17 tons of lighting and scenery in the air.

The building had to be reinforced to accommodate this and supporting columns were installed. A 5,000-square-foot (460 m^{2}) addition to the back of the building was built to accommodate extended wing space for larger, modern sets. New dressing rooms were added as was a loading dock so that even the largest production can easily be brought into the theatre.

In 2004, the final pieces of a world class sound system were installed so that any performing artist or stage act can now perform at the theatre with outstanding sound quality and no need for rented equipment.

Since its opening in 1998 the theatre has played a part in housing - Broadway shows, ice shows, plays, The Long Island Hall of Fame, comedy, auctions, dance performances and competitions and live concerts by local and national acts.

The Patchogue Theatre for the Performing Arts, has seen the likes of a wide range of Music styles, ranging from classical to Jazz, Rock, Blues, Folk, Etc. The Theatre displays a vast array of musical talent in the heart of Long Island, New York's south shore .
