= Emily Newton Barto =

American artist

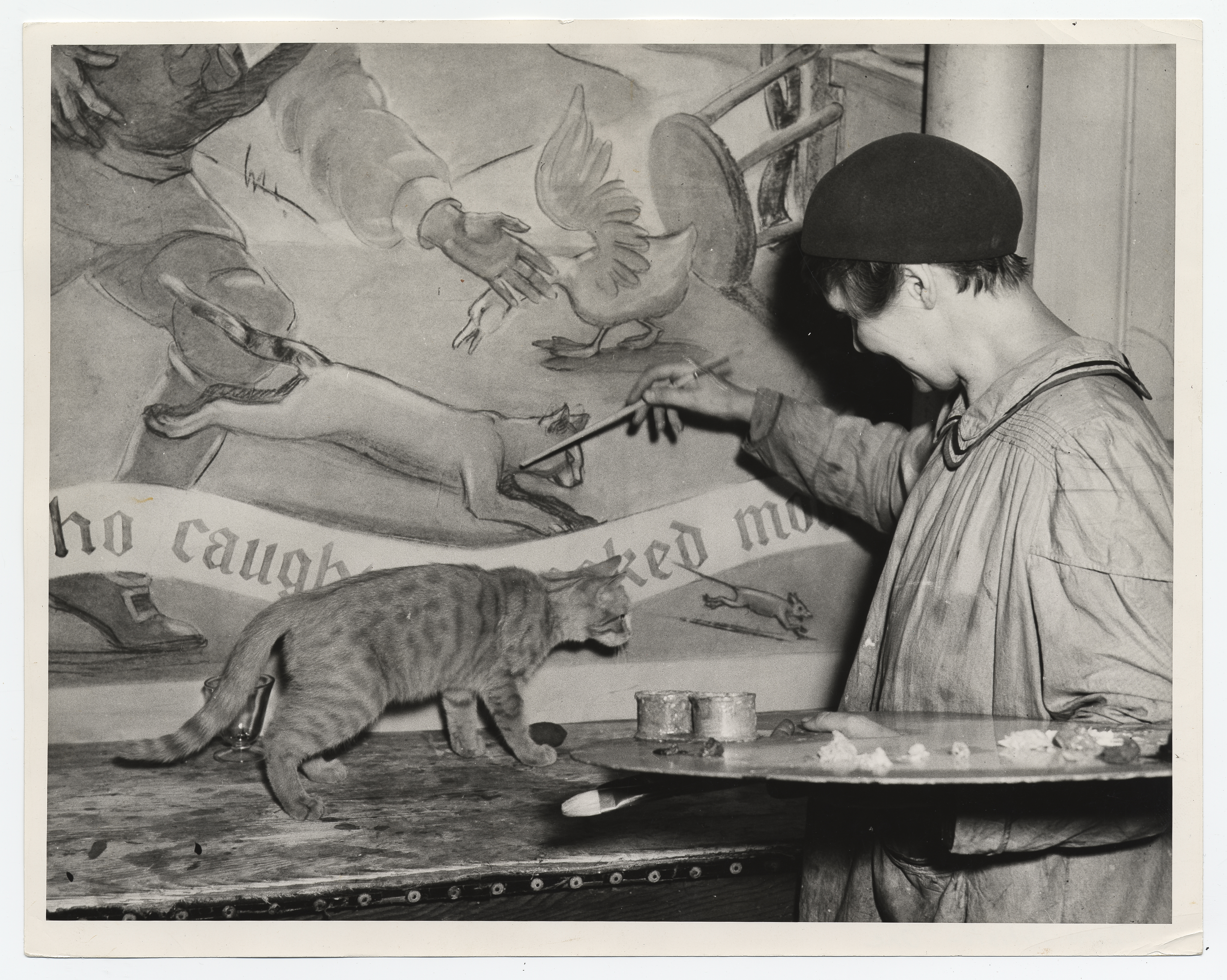
- Emily Barto working on a Federal Art Project mural, October 6, 1937.
- Born: 1896; Patchogue, New York
- Died: 1968 (aged 71–72); New York City
- Education: Cooper Union Art School, N.Y.; Art Students League of New York, National Academy of Design
- Known for: Illustrator, writer, painter

Emily Newton Barto (1896–1968) was an American children's book illustrator, writer, craftsperson, writer, and designer. She was known for painting murals at Fordham Hospital in New York City, as a Federal Arts Project participant.

== Biography ==
Emily Barto was born in 1896 in Patchogue, New York (or possibly Greenport). In 1935, as reported in the New York Times, Barto was one of six artists selected by the Municipal Art Commission to paint murals for hospitals.

Her sketchbook is in the collection of the Archives of American Art at the Smithsonian Institution.

== Works ==
- Animal Tales, mural, Fordham Hospital, New York
- Barton, Emily Newton (1942). The Piper's Son. New York; Toronto: Longmans, Green & Co. OCLC 7584656.
- Barto, Emily Newton (1940). The Crooked Man. Longmans. OCLC 7584656.
