= MoCA Long Island =

Art museum in Patchogue, Brookhaven, NY

Museum of Contemporary Art Long Island
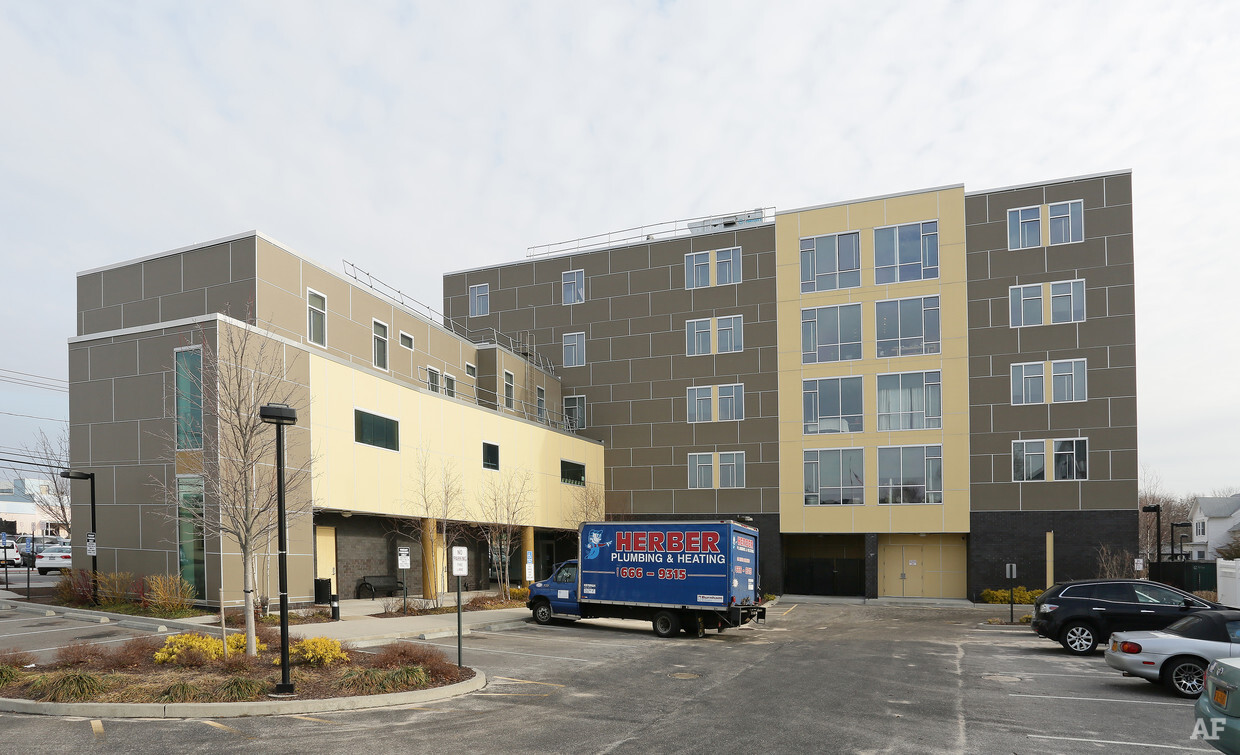
- The museum exterior in 2024
- Established: 2008
- Location: 20 Terry Street Patchogue, NY, 11772
- Coordinates: 40°45′51″N 73°0′48″W
- Type: Art museum
- Website: https://patchoguearts.org/mocali/

The Museum of Contemporary Art Long Island or simply MoCA Long Island is a Contemporary art museum located in Downtown Patchogue, New York. The museum is managed by the Patchogue Arts Council (PAC), Its granting agencies are The New York State Council on the Arts and The National Endowment for the Arts.

== Gallery and cinema ==
The museum includes an open space welcoming visitors which includes a display of art provided by regional artists. There is also a small cinema managed by Plaza Cinema and Media Arts Center, a not-for-profit media organization based in the building. The cinema is mostly for private on-demand use, with very little public audience.

== Apartment units ==
The building also includes 45 apartment units within 5 stories ranging from 750 to 1400 square feet. The apartment units opened for use in 2011, 3 years after the institution was established.
