= Briarcliffe College =

For-profit college in Long Island, New York (1966–2018)

- Type: Private for-profit college
- Active: 1966–2018
- President: George Santiago, Jr.
- Location: Long Island, New York, United States
- Website: www.briarcliffe.edu

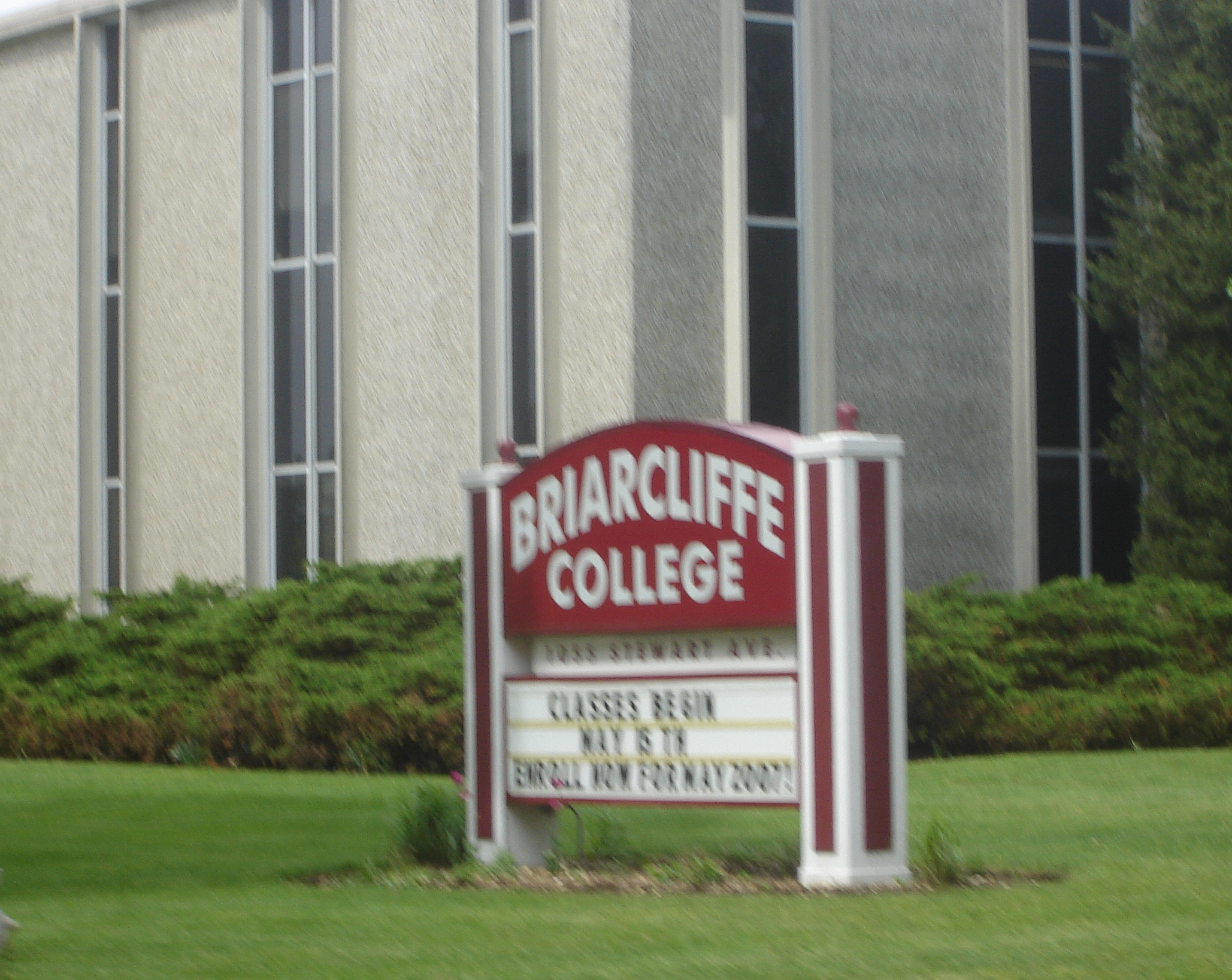
Briarcliffe College

Briarcliffe College was a private for-profit college with two campuses on Long Island, New York. It was owned by Career Education Corporation. The Bethpage campus served Nassau County, New York, and the Patchogue campus was in Suffolk County, New York. The college offered associate or bachelor programs. It stopped accepting new students in 2015 and closed in 2018, citing financial difficulties, following a $10.25 million settlement with the New York state attorney general's office over inflated job placement rates in 2013.

== History ==
Briarcliffe was founded in 1966, as a one-year business school in Hicksville, New York. A branch campus opened in 1969 in Mineola/Garden City. This branch was moved to Lynbrook, New York in 1983. In 1979, the New York State Education Department authorized Briarclffe to offer the two-year associate degree in occupational studies. A third campus was established in Patchogue, New York in 1981.

In 1992, Briarcliffe, which had an overwhelmingly female student population, purchased Grumman Data Systems Institute, a technical school with a predominantly male enrollment. The combination of the two institutions created a coeducational college of approximately 2,000 students. The main campus was moved from Hicksville to the Grumman campus in Woodbury, New York.

The college purchased a quarter-million square foot facility on approximately 20 acres (81,000 m^{2}) in Bethpage, New York in 1995. Students from the Lynbrook and Woodbury campuses were moved to this new main campus beginning with the fall semester in 1997.

In 1996, Briarcliffe become regionally accredited and the school earned the right to be called Briarcliffe College. One year later, the college became a 4-year college able to grant baccalaureate degrees. It was purchased by and is a subsidiary of Career Education Corporation.

In 2010, the college offered its first degree programs fully online.

In 2015--just five years later--the college announced that it was no longer accepting new students and would close on December 31, 2018.

== Accreditation ==
Briarcliffe College was regionally accredited by the Commission on Higher Education of the Middle States Association of Colleges and Schools beginning in 1994 and lasting until its 2018 closure. Individual programs at Briarcliffe College were programmatically accredited by additional agencies.

== Athletics ==
Briarcliffe Seahawks Baseball also made two NJCAA Division 1 World Series appearances. Upon moving to the USCAA, they won three National Championships, in 2006, 2010 and 2011. The baseball program was led by head coach Gary Puccio, Assistant Coach Enver Lopez, and former player turned coach Justin Mckay.

Briarcliffe College eliminated all intercollegiate athletics in June 2015.

== See also ==
- List of defunct colleges and universities in New York
