= Fordham Hospital =

Geography
- Location: Fordham, The Bronx, New York, United States
- Coordinates: 40.85922°N 73.88135°W

Organization
- Care system: Public
- Type: General
- Affiliated university: Fordham University
- Network: NYC Health and Hospitals Corporation; Misericordia Hospital

Services
- Beds: 387 (in 1976)

History
- Opened: 1892 (hospital); May 11, 1907 (moved to new building)
- Closed: July 15, 1976
- Demolished: 1976

Links
- Lists: Hospitals in New York State
- Other links: List of hospitals in the Bronx

Fordham Hospital was the first public hospital in the Bronx, New York City, having opened in 1892. Prior to that time, all the New York City municipal hospitals were in Manhattan. It was located in the Fordham section of the Bronx on Valentine Avenue near Kingsbridge Road, which at the time was a relatively undeveloped area, and inconvenient for patients and their families. It moved to Aqueduct Avenue and St. James Place in 1898.

== New building ==
On May 11, 1907, the hospital moved to a 4-acre (1.6 ha) location just northwest of the intersection of Southern Boulevard and Crotona Avenue, adjacent to what was then St. John's College, now Fordham University. The architect was Raymond F. Almirall. The hospital and university were affiliated at least to the extent of sharing the hospital president, who was also the dean of Fordham's medical school, which opened in 1913. Medical students from the Fordham University School of Medicine (1905–1921) interned at the hospital.

In the mid-1930s, the Federal Art Project sponsored interior murals by artists Emily Newton Barto and Elizabeth Deering.

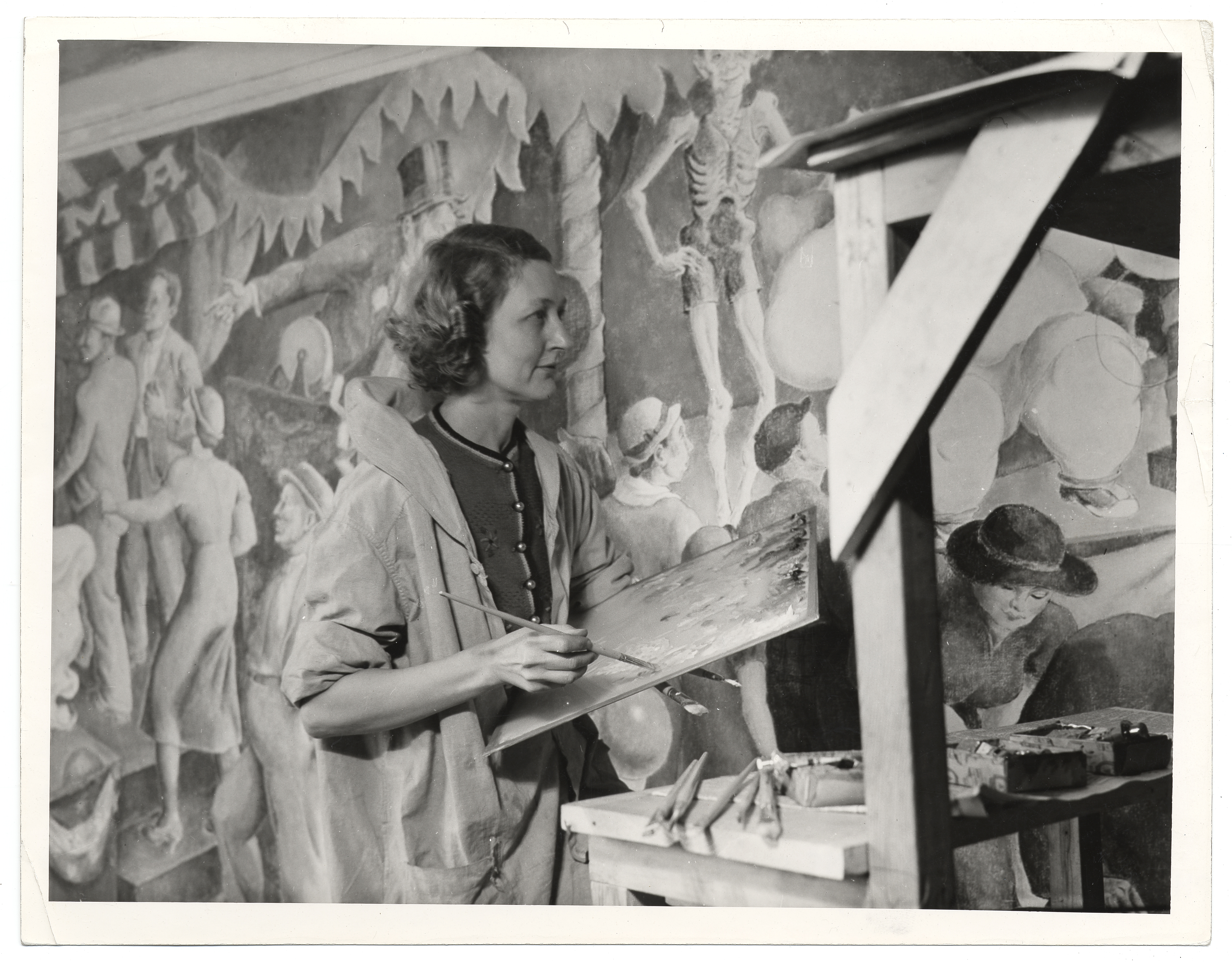
Artist Elizabeth Deering painting one of the Fordham Hospital murals on April 26, 1939

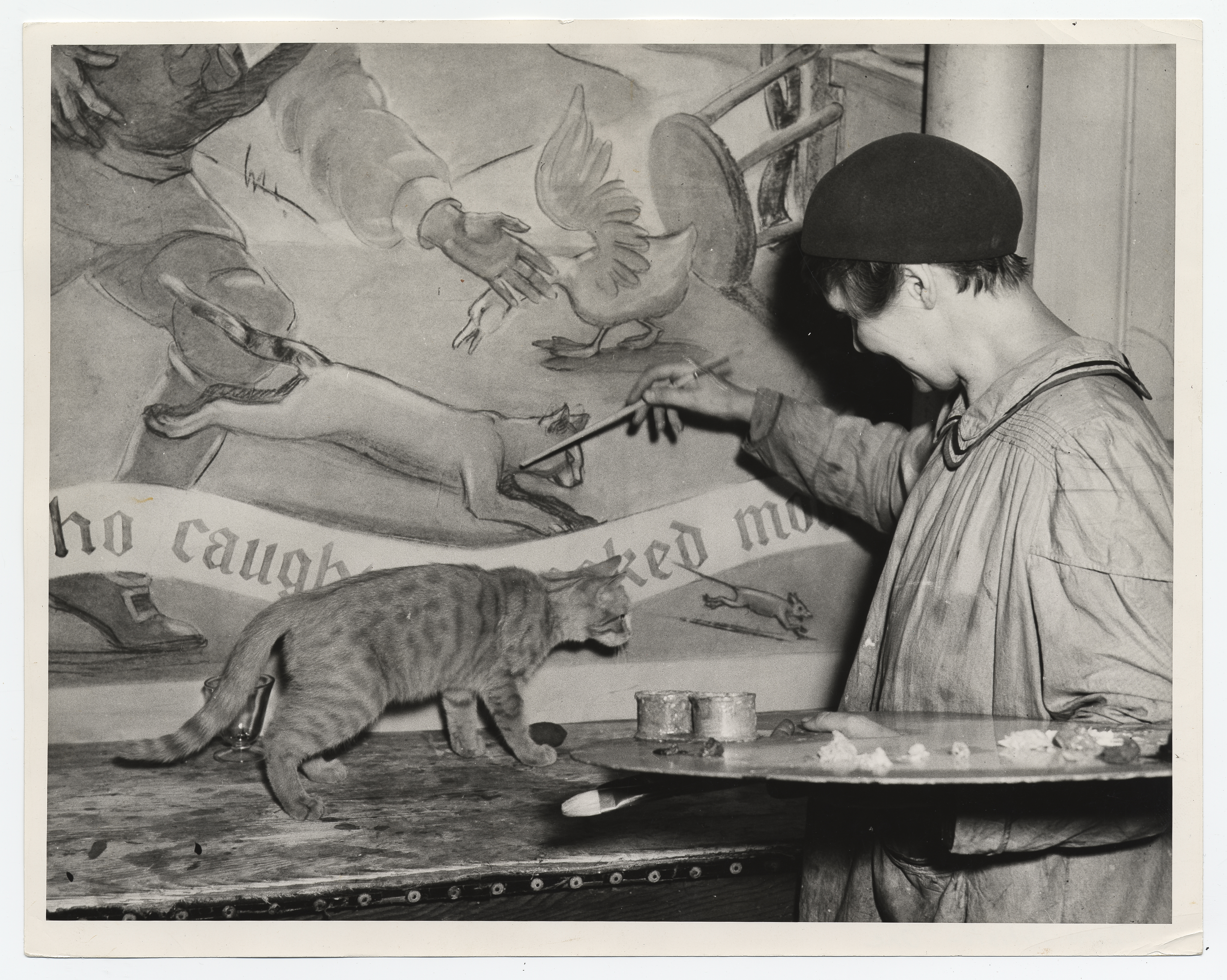
Artist Emily Barto painting one of the Fordham Hospital murals on October 6, 1937

== Closure ==
The hospital was closed on July 15, 1976, by a decision of the then owner, the New York City Health and Hospitals Corporation, despite extensive community protests, including a sit-in. Amongst those opposing the closure were Bronx Community Board 6 and Borough President Robert Abrams. The building was demolished soon afterward. The site is now The Fordham University Rose Hill Parking Facility. The NYC Health and Hospitals Corporation, considered the new North Central Bronx Hospital as the replacement for both Fordham Hospital and Morrisania Hospital.
