= Patchogue, New York =

- Village
- Incorporated Village of Patchogue
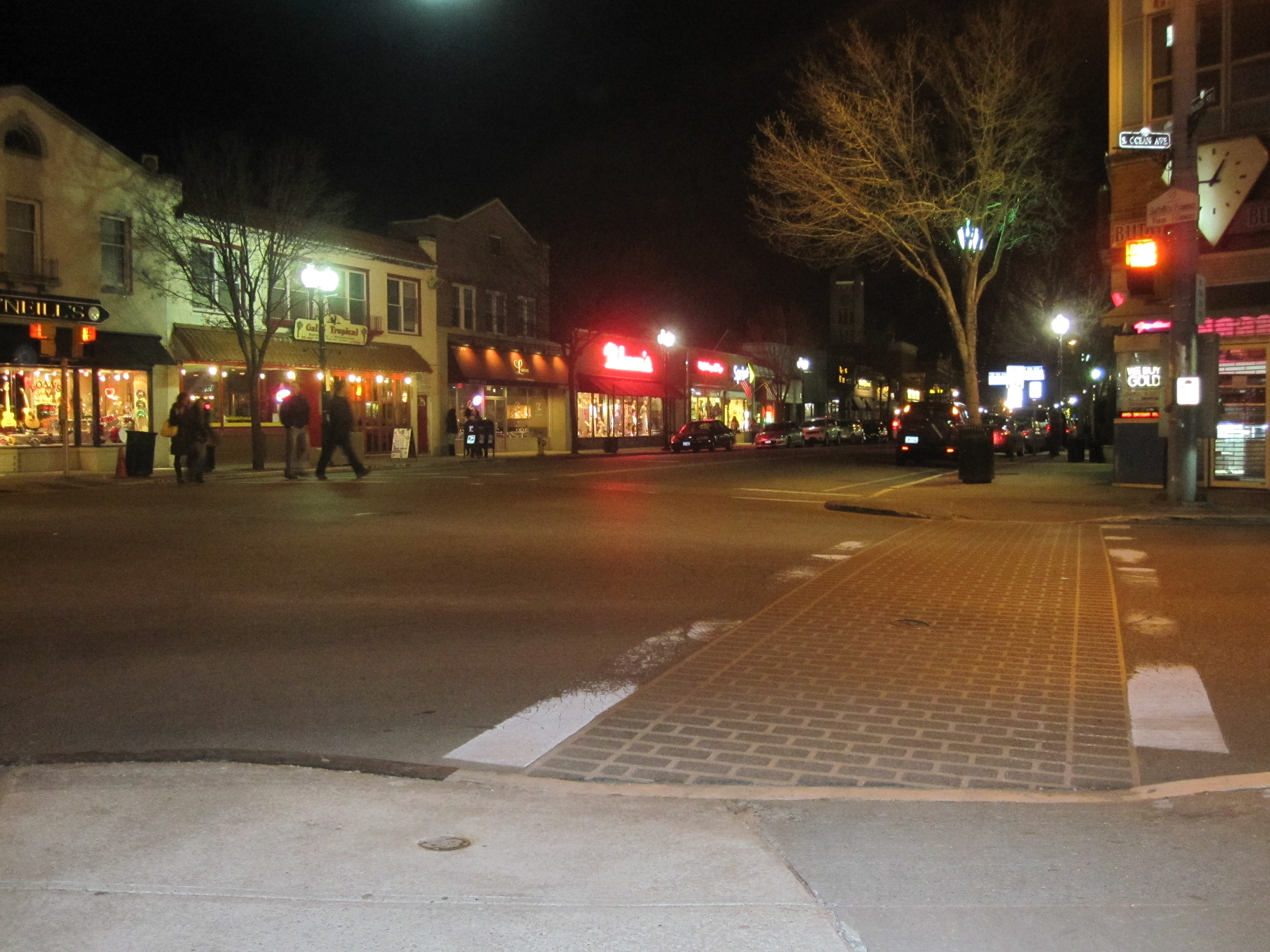
- The "Four Corners" in downtown Patchogue, where West & East Main Streets meet South & North Ocean Avenues

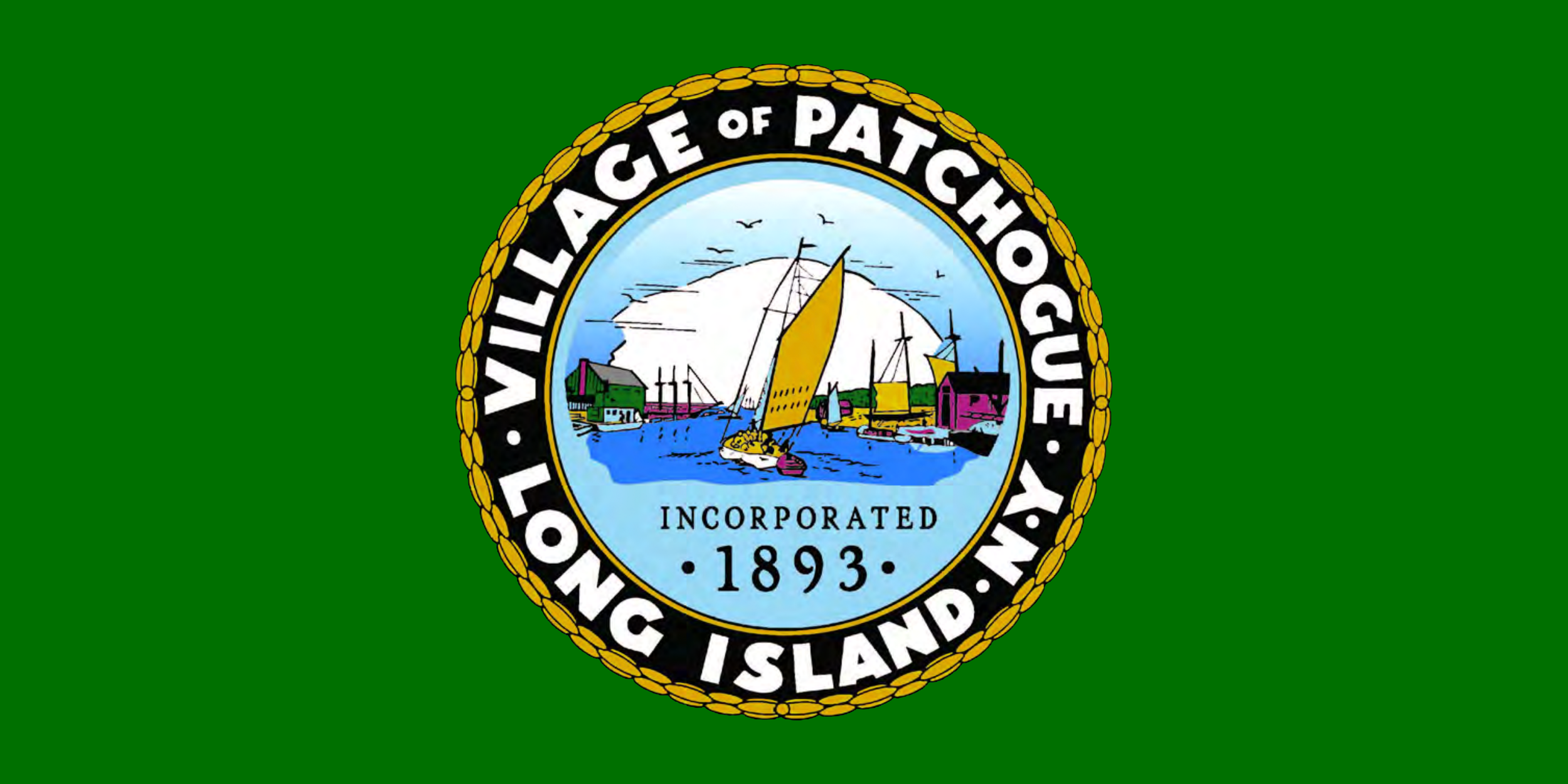
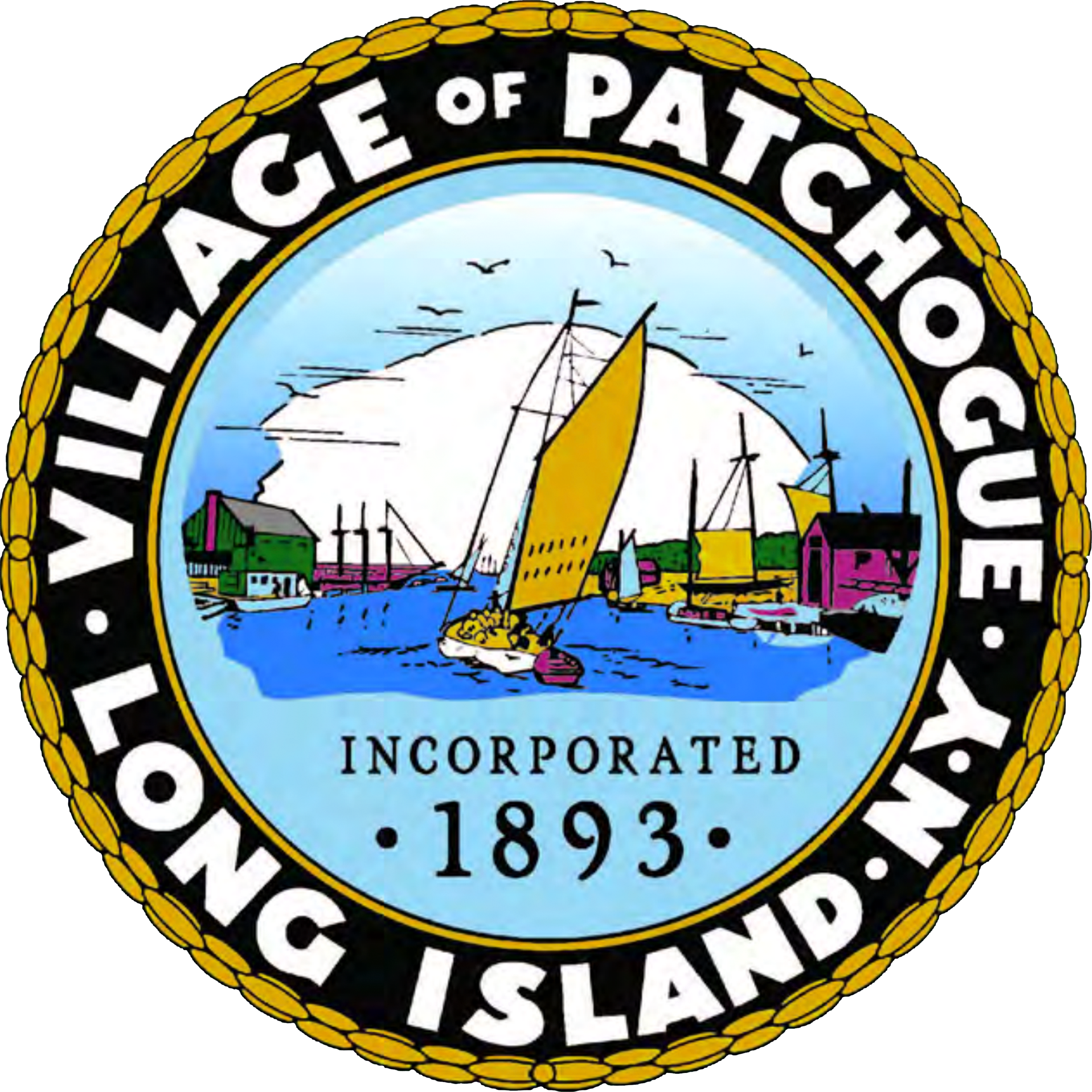
- Flag Seal

- Location in Suffolk County and the state of New York

- Location on Long Island Location within the state of New York
- Coordinates: 40°45′48″N 73°1′4″W
- Country: United States
- State: New York
- County: Suffolk
- Town: Brookhaven
- Incorporated: 1893

Government
  - Mayor: Paul V. Pontieri Jr.

Area
  - Total: 2.52 sq mi (6.53 km^{2})
  - Land: 2.26 sq mi (5.85 km^{2})
  - Water: 0.26 sq mi (0.67 km^{2})
- Elevation: 20 ft (6 m)

Population (2020)
  - Total: 12,408
  - Density: 5,489.6/sq mi (2,119.54/km^{2})
- Time zone: UTC−05:00 (Eastern Time Zone)
  - Summer (DST): UTC−04:00
- ZIP Code: 11772
- Area codes: 631, 934
- FIPS code: 36-56660
- GNIS feature ID: 0959977
- Website: www.patchoguevillage.gov

Patchogue (/ˈpætʃɒɡ/ PATCH-og) is a village located within the Town of Brookhaven in Suffolk County, on the South Shore of Long Island, in New York, United States. The population was 12,408 at the time of the 2020 census.

The Incorporated Village of Patchogue is located approximately 60 miles (100 km) east of Manhattan, along the shore of Patchogue Bay – itself part of the Great South Bay.

== History ==
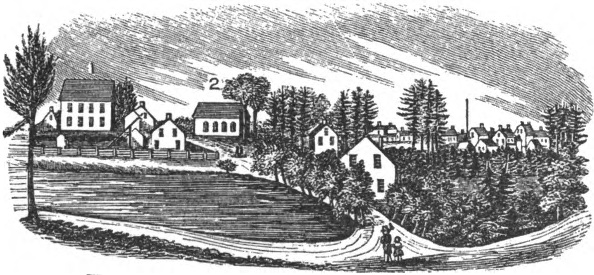
Sketch of early Patchogue

In 1812, there were 75 inhabitants in what is now Patchogue. The community incorporated as a village in 1893, after the local residents voted in favor of declaring municipal home rule.

The Patchogue Former Manufactured Gas Plant (MGP) was operated from 1904 to 1926. The company was a small operation, converting coal and/or petroleum products to a flammable gas for use in lighting and industry. The company was sold to Long Island Lighting Company (LILCO).

North Ocean Avenue looking North about 1912

The Patchogue Theatre opened in 1923. It was later renovated into a triplex, after which it was converted to a single movie theater. It closed in the late 1980s. In the mid-1990s the village acquired the theater, and completely refurbished the building; it now seats 1,166 people.

Three churches in Patchogue are listed on the National Register of Historic Places: the Congregational Church on East Main Street, United Methodist Church on South Ocean Avenue between Church Street and Terry Street, and St. Paul's Episcopal Church on Rider Avenue across from Terry Street.

In 2019, the local downtown area was recognized by the American Planning Association as one of America's four "Great Neighborhoods". Since 2007, the association has recognized over 300 neighborhoods, streets, and public spaces that make communities stronger and bring people together through good planning.

=== Etymology ===
The name "Patchogue" is believed to originate from the Algonquian word "Pochaug," which is interpreted as meaning "a turning place" or "where two streams separate."

== Geography ==
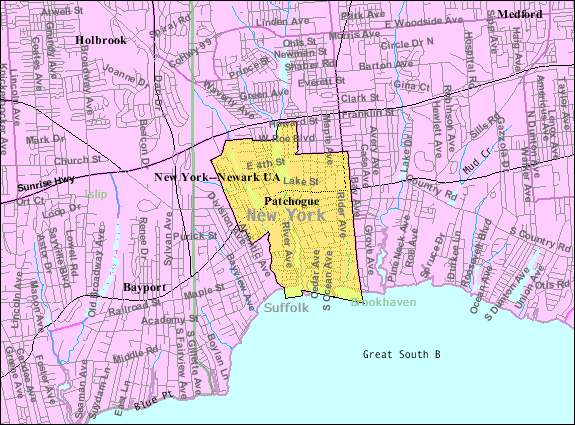
U.S. census map of Patchogue

According to the United States Census Bureau, the village has a total area of 2.5 square miles (6.5 km^{2}), of which 2.2 square miles (5.7 km^{2}) is land and 0.3 square miles (0.78 km^{2}) – or 10.71% – is water.

A natural riverfront and harbor are resources that the village has utilized since its founding, to become a modern and largely self-contained community.

=== Topography ===
Like so many other coastal communities located along the South Shore of Long Island, Patchogue is situated on an outwash plain, to the south of the Harbor Hill and Ronkonkoma Moraines. Those moraines were formed by glaciers during prehistoric times, and never advanced as far south as Patchogue, in turn causing its landscape to be relatively flat, unlike places on the North Shore.

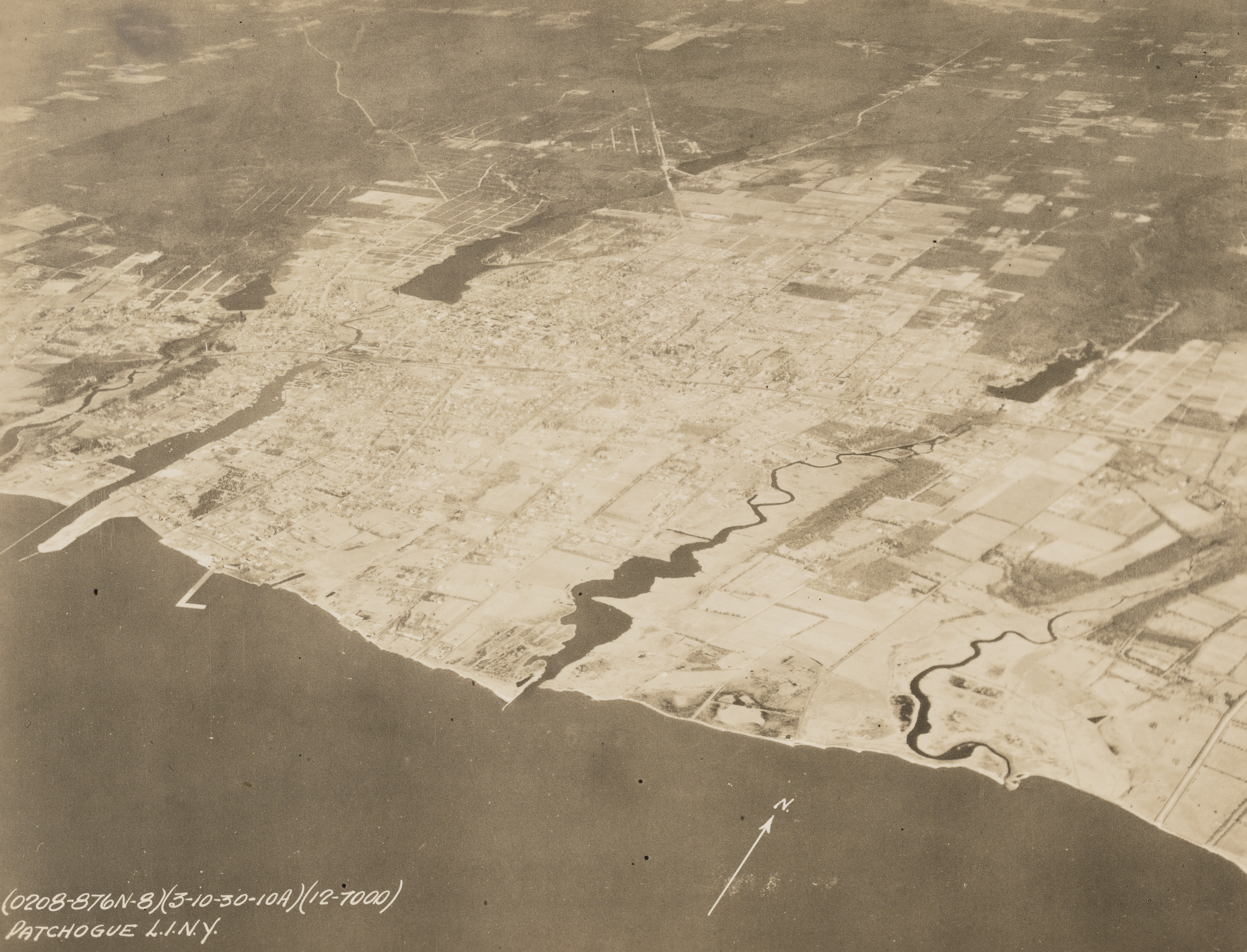
View of Patchogue in 1930

== Economy ==
The Blue Point Brewing Company is based in Patchogue. The Patchogue Central Business District or "Downtown" is the 2nd Largest Financial district in Eastern Long Island. Downtown is major transport and exchange hub throughout Eastern New York and Southern Connecticut. There is a museum located within the village called MoCA Long Island.

The Median family income is $110,576.

== Demographics ==
Historical population
Census	Pop.	Note	%±
1880	2,503		—
1900	2,926		—
1910	3,824		30.7%
1920	4,031		5.4%
1930	6,860		70.2%
1940	7,181		4.7%
1950	7,361		2.5%
1960	8,838		20.1%
1970	11,582		31.0%
1980	11,291		−2.5%
1990	11,060		−2.0%
2000	11,919		7.8%
2010	11,798		−1.0%
2020	12,408		5.2%
U.S. Decennial Census

=== 2020 census ===
As of the 2020 census, Patchogue had a population of 12,408. The median age was 40.7 years. 17.0% of residents were under the age of 18 and 14.7% of residents were 65 years of age or older. For every 100 females there were 100.7 males, and for every 100 females age 18 and over there were 101.1 males age 18 and over.

100.0% of residents lived in urban areas, while 0.0% lived in rural areas.

There were 5,456 households in Patchogue, of which 22.8% had children under the age of 18 living in them. Of all households, 33.9% were married-couple households, 27.3% were households with a male householder and no spouse or partner present, and 30.1% were households with a female householder and no spouse or partner present. About 38.4% of all households were made up of individuals and 11.6% had someone living alone who was 65 years of age or older.

There were 5,776 housing units, of which 5.5% were vacant. The homeowner vacancy rate was 1.3% and the rental vacancy rate was 5.0%.

Racial composition as of the 2020 census
Race	Number	Percent
White	8,162	65.8%
Black or African American	726	5.9%
American Indian and Alaska Native	91	0.7%
Asian	243	2.0%
Native Hawaiian and Other Pacific Islander	1	0.0%
Some other race	1,930	15.6%
Two or more races	1,255	10.1%
Hispanic or Latino (of any race)	3,520	28.4%

=== 2010 census ===
In 2010, the demographics were 61.8% White, 29.6% Hispanic, 5.3% Black, 0.3% Native American, 1.6% Asian, 0.1% Some Other Race, and 1.4% Two or More Races.

=== 2000 census ===
As of the 2000 census, there were 11,919 people, 4,636 households, and 2,749 families residing in the village. The population density was 5,301.2 inhabitants per square mile (2,046.8/km^{2}). There were 4,902 housing units at an average density of 2,180.2 per square mile (841.8/km^{2}). The racial makeup of the village was 81.27% White, 3.89% African American, 0.34% Native American, 1.39% Asian, 0.02% Pacific Islander, 9.23% from other races, and 3.85% from two or more races. Hispanics or Latinos of any race were 23.84% of the population.

There were 4,636 households, out of which 29.5% had children under the age of 18 living with them, 40.3% were married couples living together, 13.4% had a female householder with no husband present, and 40.7% were non-families. 31.8% of all households were made up of individuals, and 9.0% had someone living alone who was 65 years of age or older. The average household size was 2.54 and the average family size was 3.20.

22.5% of Patchogue's inhabitants were under the age of 18, 9.2% ranged from 18 and 24, 37.1% from 25 to 44, 20.7% from 45 to 64, and 10.5% were 65 years of age or older. The median age was 35 years. For every 100 females, there were 100.4 males. For every 100 females age 18 and over, there were 99.7 males.

The median income for a household in the village was $47,027, and the median income for a family was $60,126. Males had a median income of $38,561 versus $30,599 for females. The per capita income for the village was $22,962. 8.1% of families and 10.7% of the population were below the poverty threshold, including 13.5% of those under age 18 and 10.4% of those age 65 or over.

== Government ==
=== Village government ===
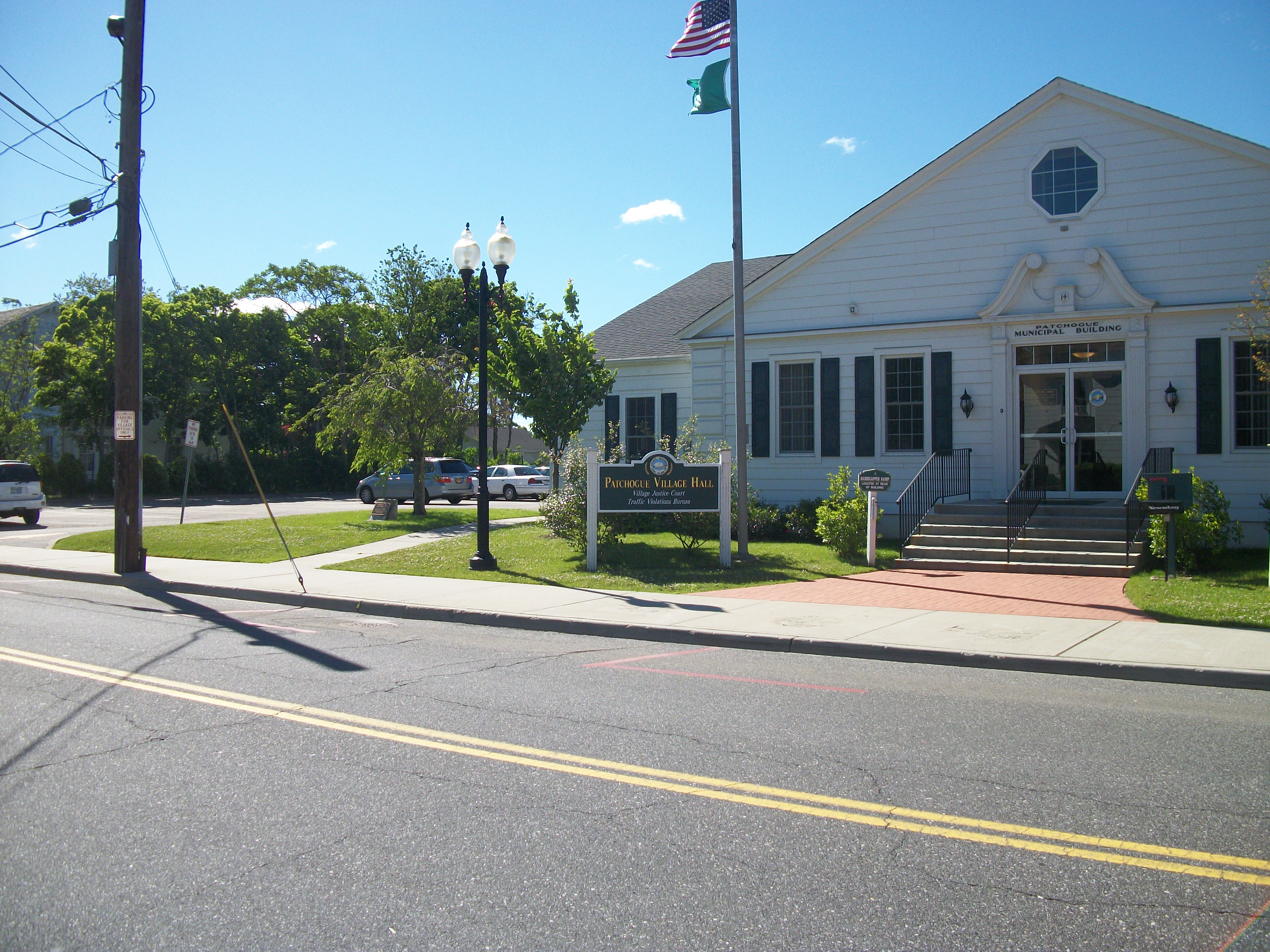
Patchogue Village Hall in 2013

The Village of Patchogue is seated at Patchogue Village Hall and is governed by the Patchogue Board of Trustees. This legislative body consists of a Mayor and six Village Trustees – one of whom is appointed as Deputy Mayor annually by the Mayor. All members of the Board of Trustees serve four-year terms, with village elections occurring every two years.

As of July 2025, the Mayor of Patchogue is Paul V. Pontieri, the Deputy Mayor is Jack A. Krieger, and the Village Trustees are Lizbeth Carrillo, Thomas E. Ferb, Susan Henke Brinkman, Jack A. Krieger, and Kevin A. Weeks.

==== Village Justice ====
The Village of Patchogue operates a municipal court. Accordingly, it has an elected Village Justice, who serves a four-year term.

As of July 2025, the Village Justice of Patchogue is the Hon. Kerri N. Lechtrecker.

==== Public Safety ====
The Patchogue Department of Public Safety is a Public security department to insure well-being of all Patchogue Residents, similar to a Police Department.

Additionally, the village formerly operated its own police department. This municipal department – the Patchogue Police Department – dissolved in the 1940s, when the village opted to instead join the newly-formed Suffolk County Police Department.

=== Representation in higher government ===
==== Town representation ====
Patchogue is located entirely within the Town of Brookhaven's 5th council district, which as of July 2025 is represented in the Brookhaven Town Council by Neil Foley (R–Blue Point).

Additionally, Patchogue served as the Town Seat of Brookhaven until 1986.

==== County representation ====
Patchogue is located entirely within Suffolk County's 7th Legislative district, which as of July 2025 is represented in the Suffolk County Legislature by Dominick S. Thorne (R–Patchogue).

==== State representation ====
===== New York State Senate =====
Patchogue is located entirely within New York's 3rd State Senate district, which as of July 2025 is represented by L. Dean Murray (R–East Patchogue).

===== New York State Assembly =====
Patchogue is located within New York's 7th State Assembly district, which as of July 2025 is represented by Jarett Gandolfo (R–Sayville).

==== Federal representation ====
===== United States Congress =====
Patchogue is located entirely within New York's 2nd congressional district, which as of July 2025 is represented in the United States Congress by Andrew Garbarino (R–Bayport).

===== United States Senate =====
As with the rest of New York, Patchogue is represented in the United States Senate by Kirsten E. Gillibrand (D) and Charles E. Schumer (D).

=== Politics ===
In the 2024 U.S. presidential election, the majority of Patchogue's voters voted for Donald J. Trump (R).

== Education ==
=== Schools ===
Patchogue is primarily located within the boundaries of (and is thus served by) the Patchogue-Medford Central School District. However, some of the westernmost parts of Patchogue are instead located within (and served) by the Bayport-Blue Point School District. There are primary, middle and high schools, plus continuing education programs for adults.

Secondary education

- South Ocean Middle School

Primary education

- Bay Elementary School
- River Elementary School
- Medford Elementary School
- Barton Elementary School

Private

- Seton Hall High School
- Holy Angels Regional School
- Emanuel Lutheran Preschool

Adult education

- Briarcliff College-Patchogue (former)
- St. Joseph's University
- Bramstein School of Applied Studies

=== Libraries ===
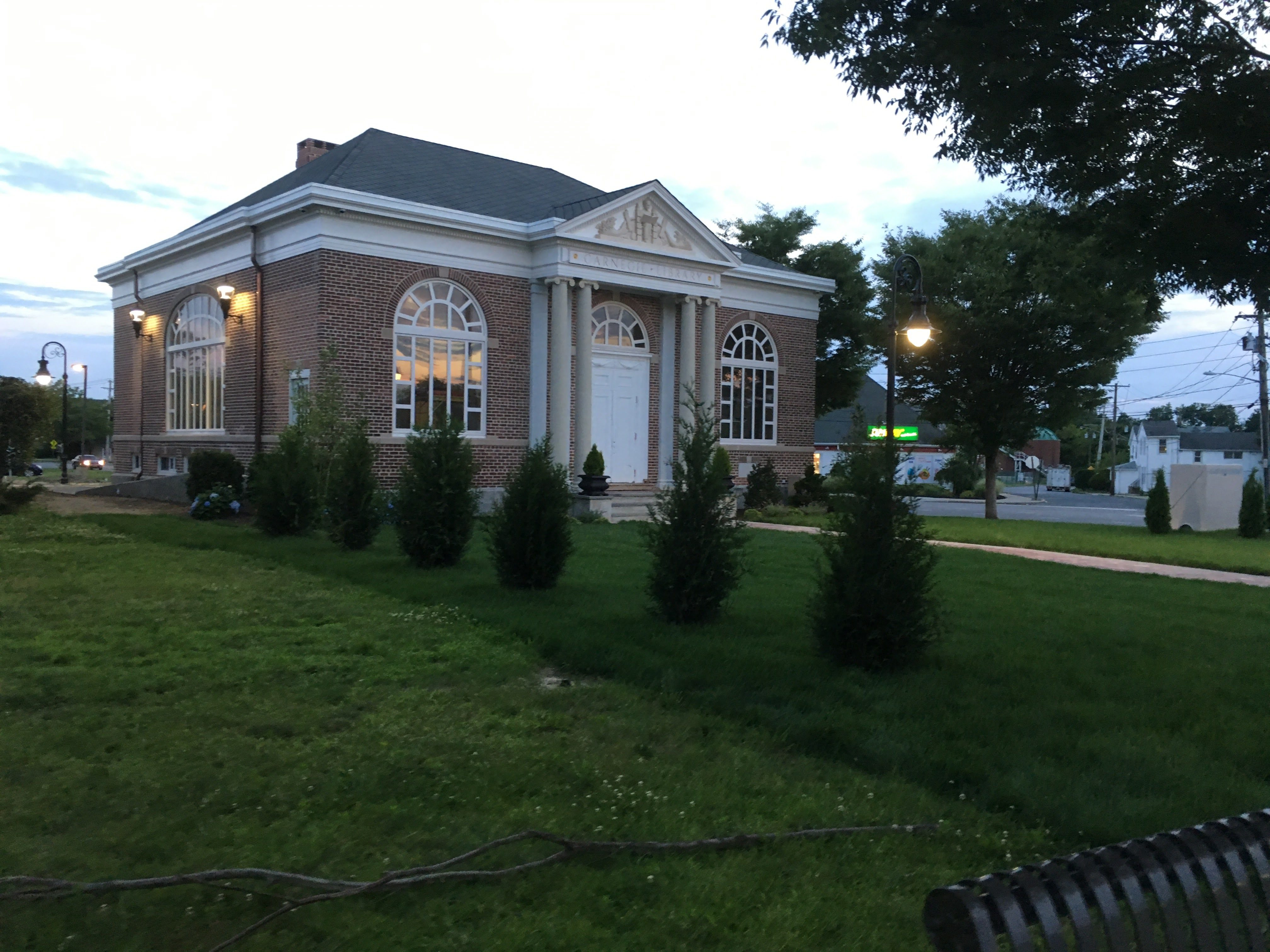
The Patchogue Carnegie Library in 2016

Patchogue is served by the Patchogue-Medford Library District. One of this library district's branches is the Patchogue Carnegie Library, which was donated by Andrew Carnegie.

== Media ==
The Patchogue newspaper The Long Island Advance dates back to 1871, when Timothy J. Dyson – a former newspaper correspondent from Brooklyn – printed the first edition out of a small office on West Main Street.

The news website GreaterPatchogue.com began publication in 2015. It is owned by Greater Long Island Media Group, Inc., an independent company based in Patchogue.

Radio stations Big 98.1, WALK-FM, WBLI, WLID and WNYG are licensed to serve Patchogue.

== Transportation ==
=== Road ===
The main roads through Patchogue are Sunrise Highway (NY 27) and New York State Route 112. Other major roads located within the village include County Route 19, Montauk Highway (CR 80/85), County Route 101, and South and North Ocean Avenues (the latter of which leads to County Route 83).

=== Rail ===
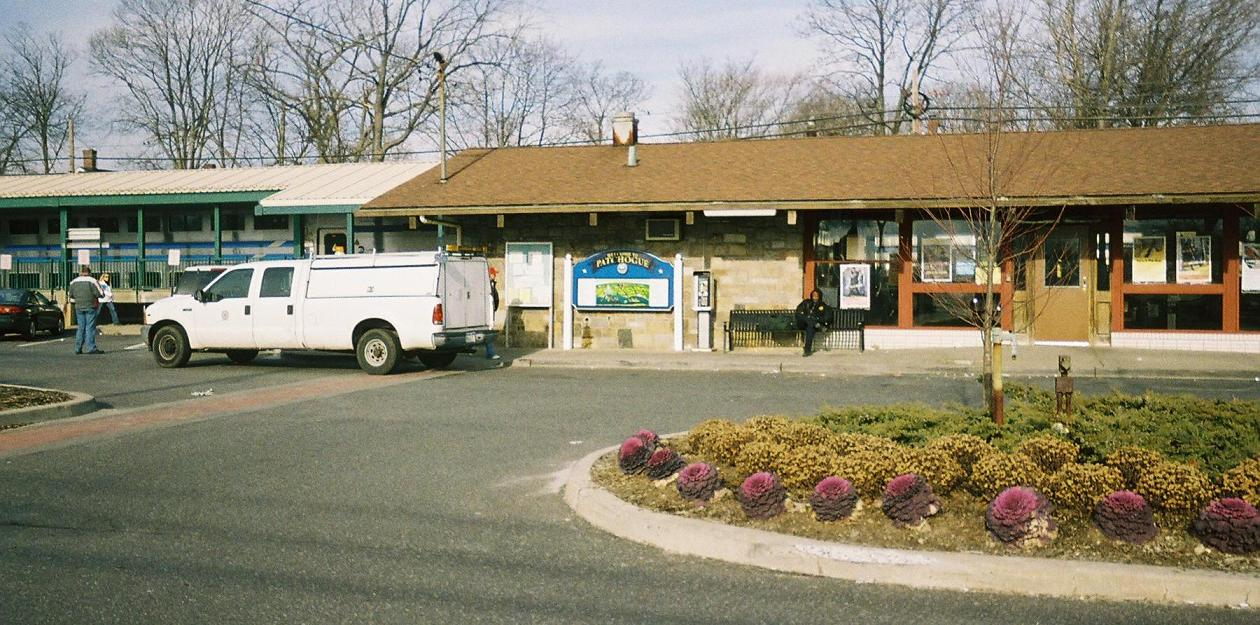
The Patchogue LIRR station in 2008

The Patchogue LIRR station, located on the Long Island Rail Road's Montauk Branch is located within and serves the Village of Patchogue. Located near the heart of the village's downtown, it serves as one of Suffolk County's major transportation hubs.

=== Bus ===
Eight Suffolk County Transit bus routes (2, 6, 51, 53, 55, 66, 77 and 77Y) travel through and serve the Village of Patchogue, and the Patchogue LIRR station is one of the bus system's major hubs.

Additionally, the Village of Patchogue formerly operated Village of Patchogue Transit – a public bus system with four routes exclusively running within the village. Service commenced in 1975 and ended about 2016.

=== Ferry ===
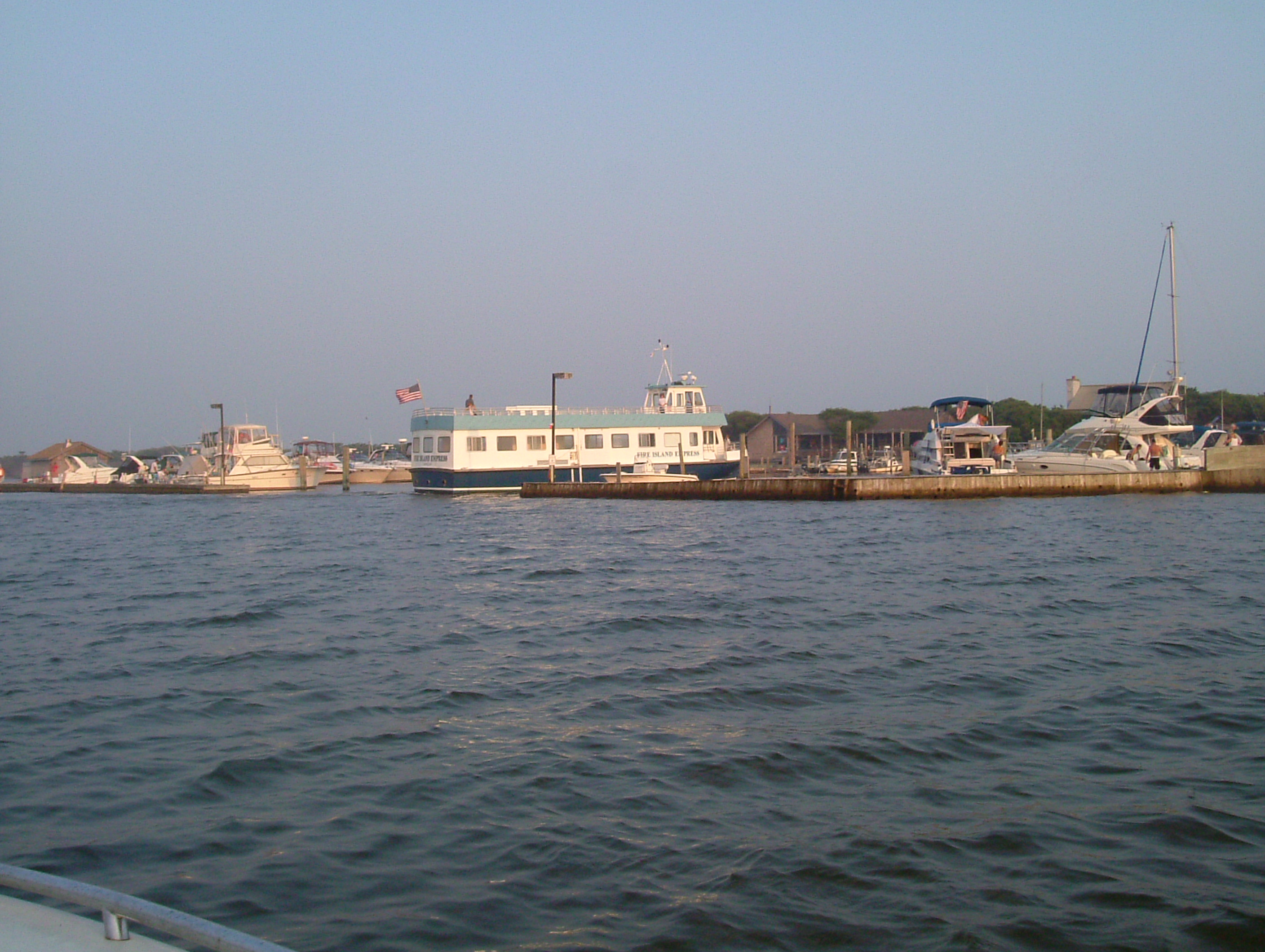
A Watch Hill ferryboat docked at the terminal in Patchogue in 2003

Patchogue is home to the Davis Park Ferry Company's Long Island terminals for its two Patchogue–Fire Island ferry routes: the Patchogue–Watch Hill Ferry (serving the Watch Hill Visitor Center in the Otis Pike Fire Island High Dune Wilderness) and the Patchogue Davis Park Ferry (serving Davis Park, New York). The terminals are located within walking distance of the LIRR station.

== Notable people ==
- Emily Newton Barto, painter; born in Patchogue
- Edwin Bailey (1836–1908), businessman and politician
- Walta Borawski, American poet
- George F. Carman, politician
- Frank Castellano, captain of USS Bainbridge
- Peter David, comics writer, novelist, and screenwriter, known as the co-creator of Spider-Man 2099, and for his influential 12-year run on The Incredible Hulk; lived in Patchogue from the early 1990s until his death in 2025.
- Mike Fagan, professional bowler
- Charles S. Havens, politician
- Billy Idol, English musician; lived in a house in Patchogue when his family emigrated to the United States in 1958.
- Leila Kenzle, actress; was born in Patchogue (1960)
- Jeffrey R. MacDonald, convicted of killing his wife and daughters, lived in Patchogue and attended Patchogue High School. This story was the focus of the book and television mini-series Fatal Vision
- Biz Markie, rapper; lived in Patchogue
- Chrisette Michele, Patchogue-raised Grammy winner who won a Grammy Award for Best Urban/Alternative Performance in 2009 for her song "Be OK".
- Michael P. Murphy, Navy SEAL officer awarded the Medal of Honor, grew up in Patchogue
- Robert Pelletreau, diplomat and ambassador, born in Patchogue, lawyer from family of prominent judges and lawyers in Patchogue, Pelletreau & Pelletreau.
- Sylvia Porter, journalist; born in Patchogue (1913)
- William T. Sanders, anthropologist specialising in Mesoamerican archaeology, born and grew up in Patchogue.
- Jeff Schaefer, baseball player for Chicago White Sox (1989), born in Patchogue.
- Edgar A. Sharp, United States representative to the Seventy-ninth Congress (1945–1947): born in Patchogue (1876).
- Renée Felice Smith, actress on NCIS: Los Angeles. Attended Patchogue-Medford High School.
- William Stuart-Houston (born William Patrick Hitler), Adolf Hitler's half-nephew; lived on Silver Street, along with his mother Bridget, his wife Phyllis, and his four sons, Alexander, Louis, Howard, and Brian.

== See also ==
- East Patchogue, New York
- Mascot Dock
- North Patchogue, New York
- Patchogue Bay
- Patchogue-Medford High School
- Patchogue-Medford Library
- Patchogue-Medford School District
- Patchogue River
- Patchogue Theatre
- Sandspit Park Beach & Marina
- Shorefront Park
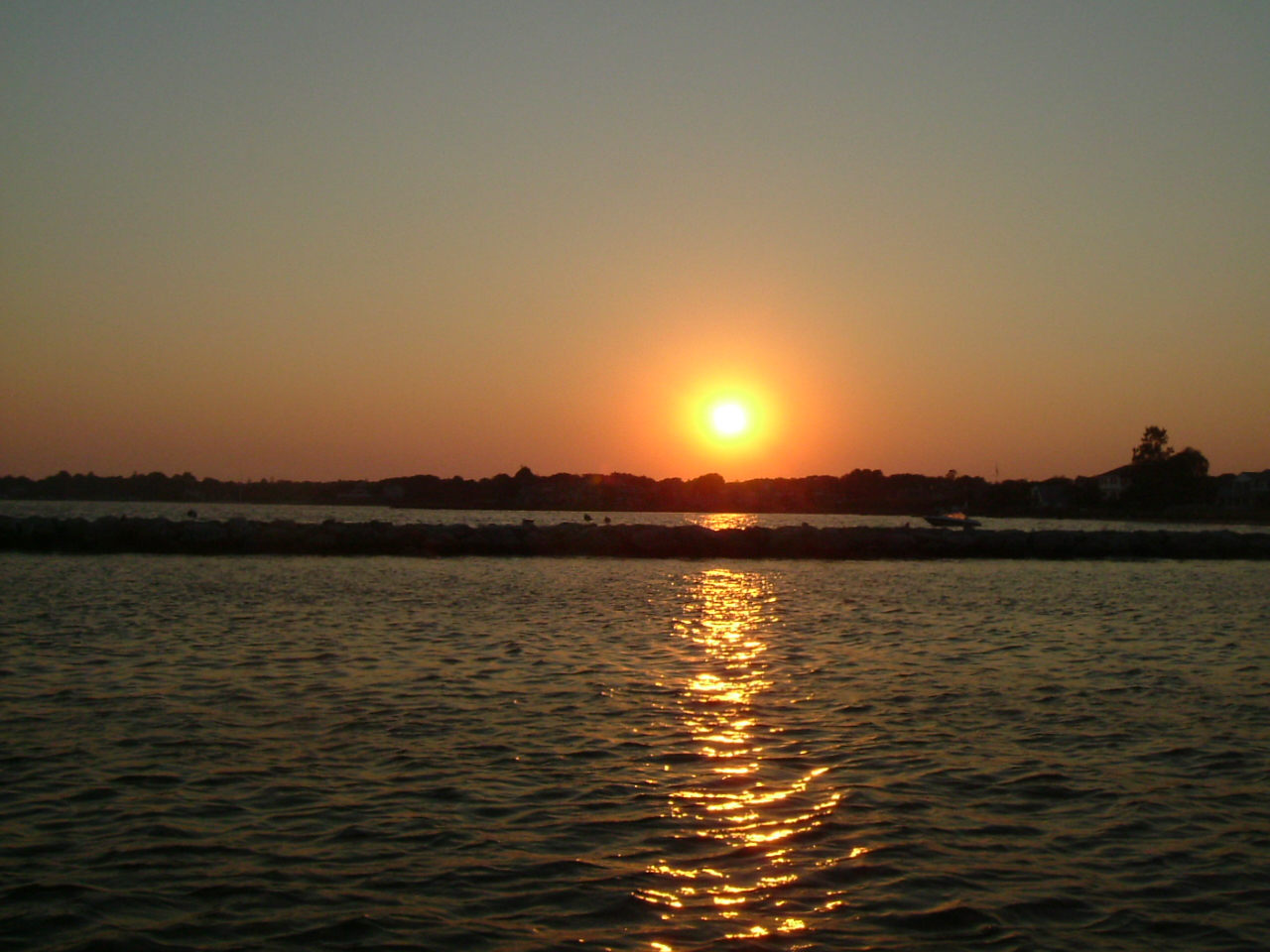
Sunset off the Mascot Dock

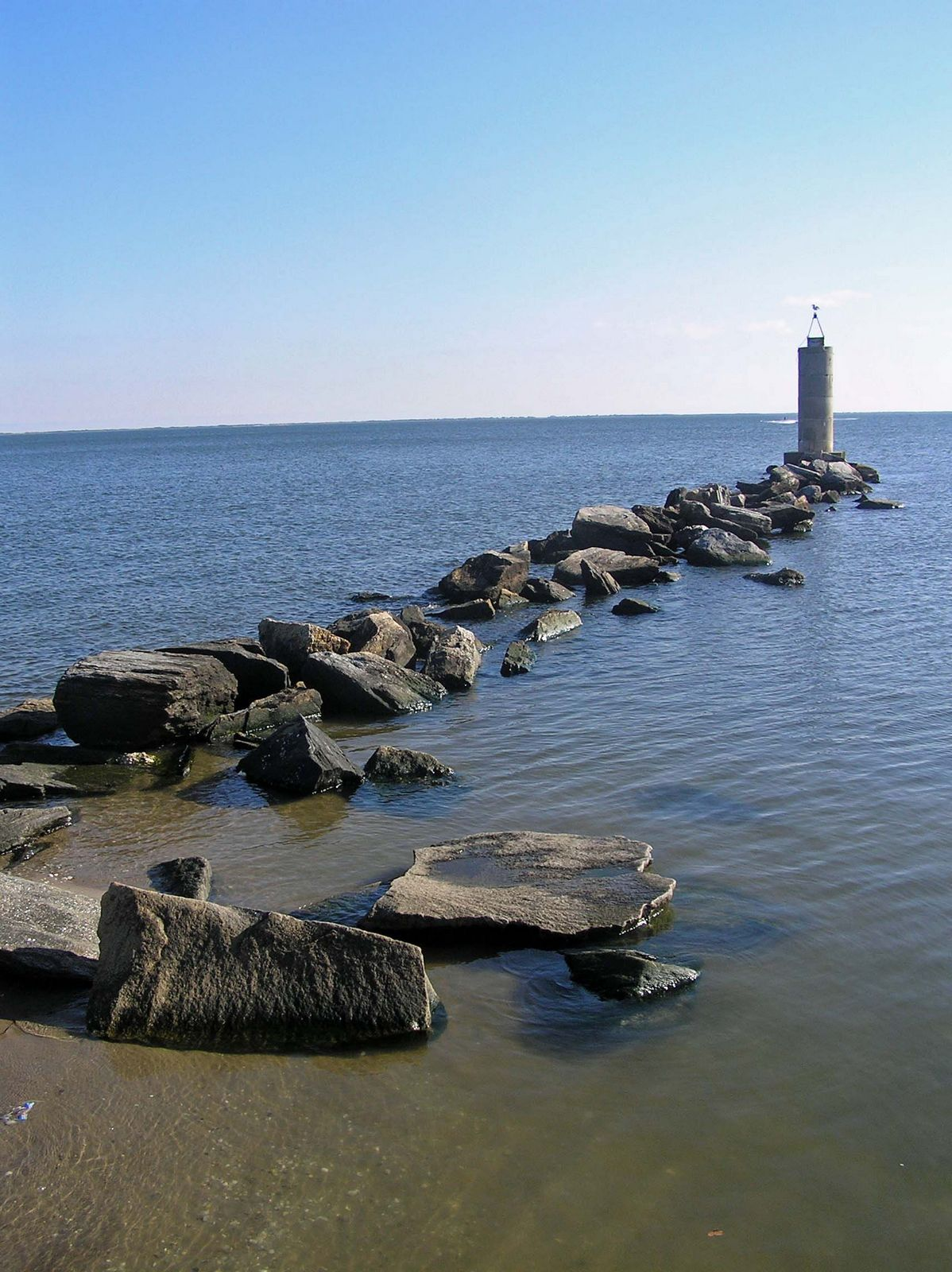
Patchogue Bay

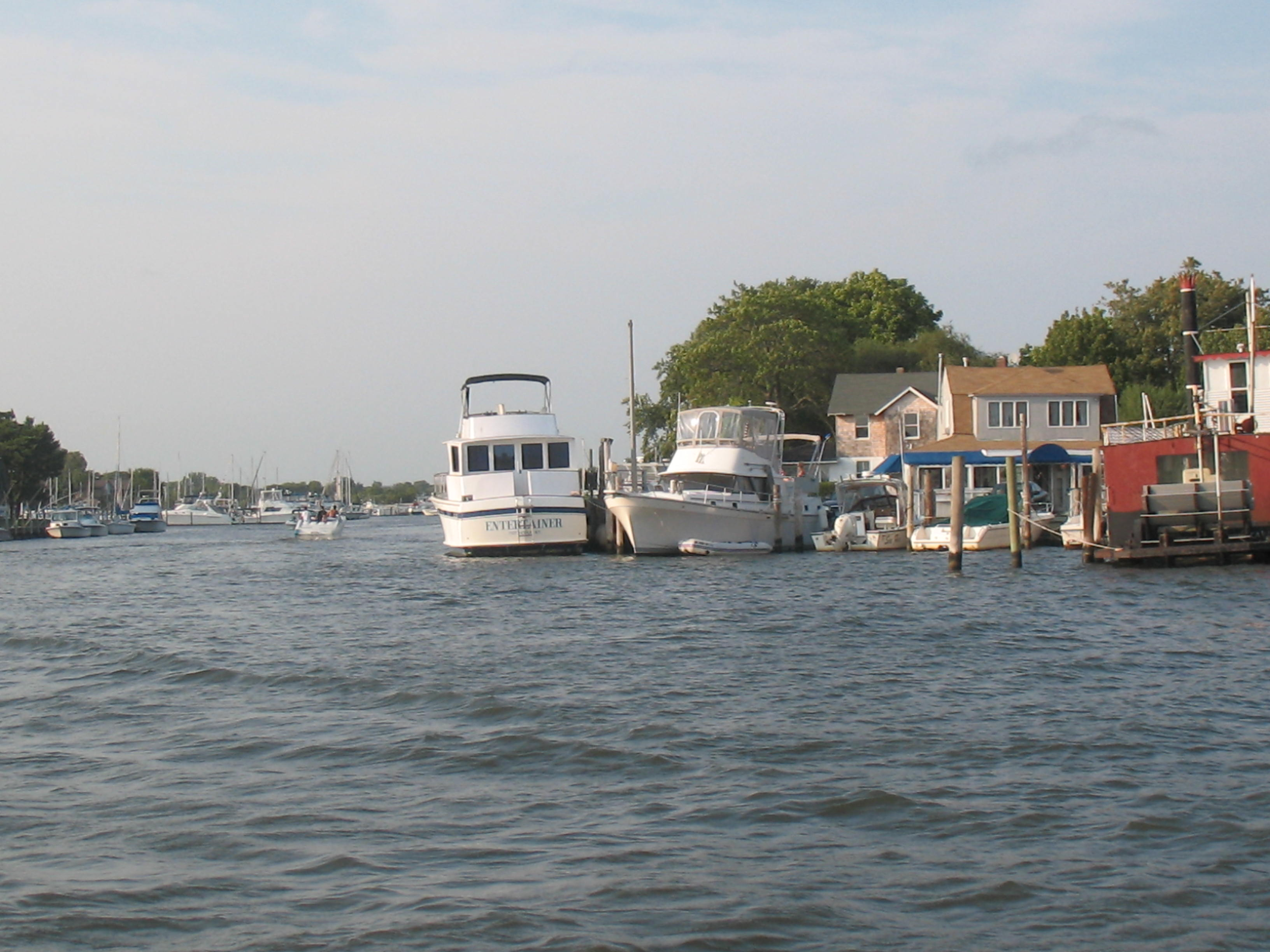
Patchogue River

== Bibliography ==
- Images of America: Patchogue, by Hans Henke, Patchogue Village Historian, Arcadia Publishing.
- The Patchogue Story, by historian Anne Swezey, (February 6, 1924 – April 20, 2009)
