= Blue Point Brewing Company =

Brewery in Patchogue, Long Island, New York

Coordinates: 40°45′33″N 73°01′17″W

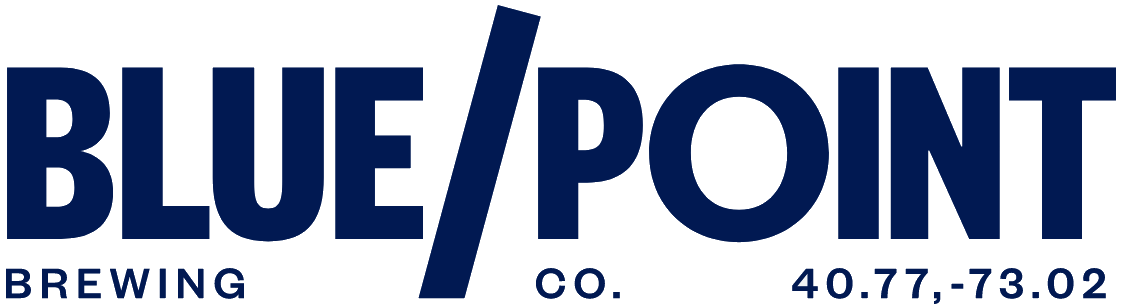
- Interactive map of Blue Point Brewing Company
- Location: Patchogue, New York; United States
- Opened: 1998
- Annual production volume: 54,000 US beer barrels (63,000 hL)
- Owner: Tilray
- Website: bluepointbrewing.com

Active beers
Name	Type
Toasted Lager	Amber lager
Hoptical Illusion	American IPA
Mosaic Session IPA	American IPA
Blue Point Blueberry Ale	Fruit beer
Beach Plum Gose	Gose
Prop Stopper	American IPA
Citrus Plunge	American IPA
Macho Muchacho	Mexican-style Lager
Delayed	Pilsner
Hazy Bastard	New England IPA
Blue Point Oyster Stout	Oyster Stout
Rum Barrel-Aged Oyster Stout	Oyster Stout
Bourbon Barrel-Aged Imperial Stout with Sour Cherries	Stout
Rye Barrel-Aged Rastafarye	Rye Beer
Rum Barrel-Aged Imperial Red Ale	Red Ale

Seasonal beers
Name	Type
Blue Point Summer Ale	Golden Ale
Honey Robber	Cream Ale
Blue Point Oktoberfest	Oktoberfest
Blue Point Pumpkin Ale	Pumpkin Ale
Blue Point Winter Ale	Amber ale

Blue Point Brewing Company is a brewery that is a subsidiary of Tilray located on Long Island, in Patchogue, New York. The brewery offers a variety of year-round beers, and several seasonal brews, as well as a 'tasting room' which is open to the public on Tuesdays, Wednesdays, Thursdays, Fridays, Saturdays, and Sundays. The brewery hosts an annual Cask Ale Festival, concerts and other events in the brew yard.

== History ==
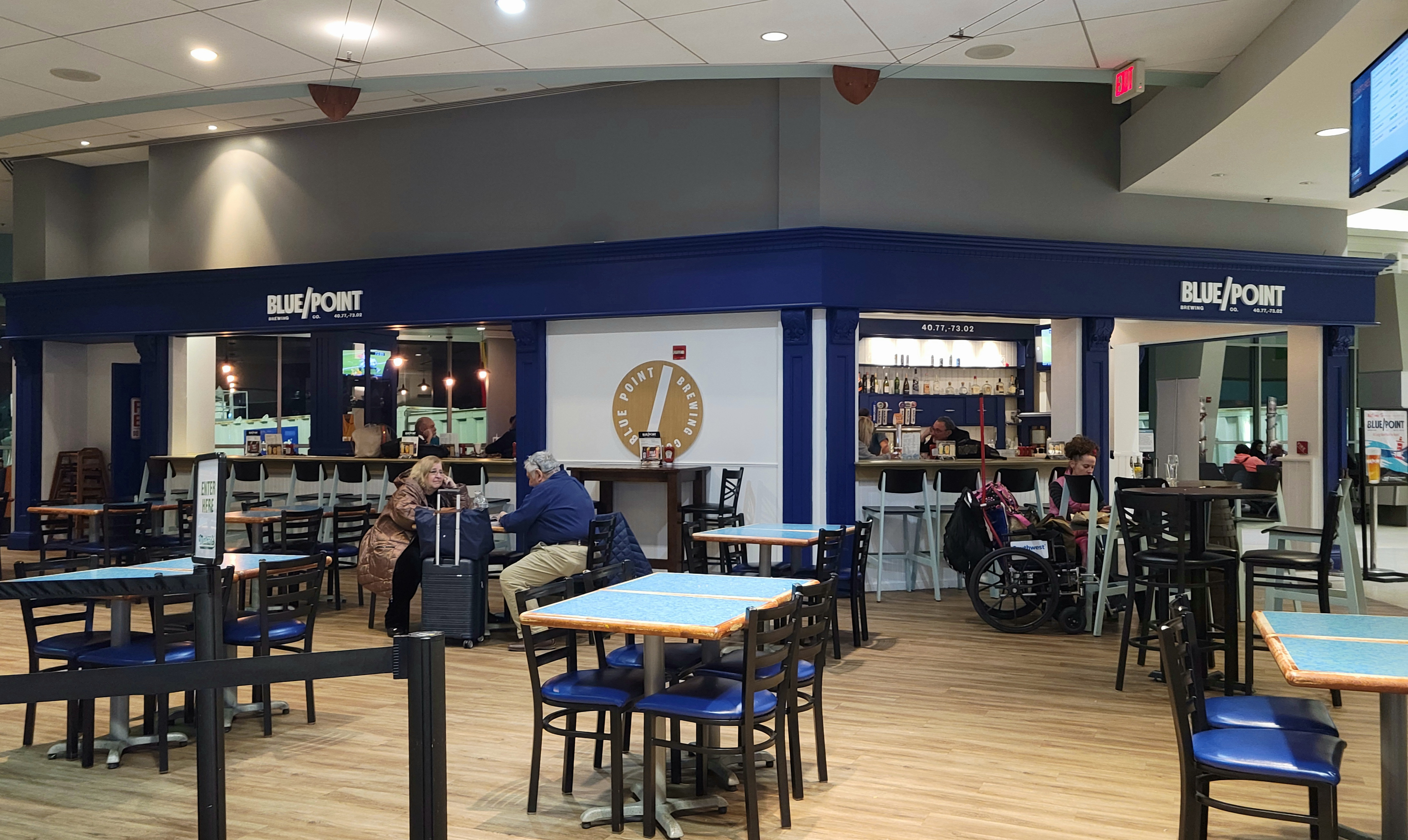
Bluepoint Brewery taprooom at Long Island MacArthur Airport.

The brewery was founded in 1998 in a former ice factory by Mark Burford and Pete Cotter, both avid home-brewers at the time. In regards to the decision to open up a brewery, Pete said: "Other parts of the country had local microbreweries and we saw an opportunity for a microbrewery to meet the demand in the market between Montauk and Manhattan."

Blue Point Brewing Company's flagship Toasted Lager won a gold medal at the 2006 World Beer Cup in the American-Style Amber Lager category.

In 2014, Blue Point was sold to Anheuser-Busch InBev for nearly $24 million. At the time of acquisition the brewery was distributed in 19 states as well as Washington D.C. The brewery continued to operate in Patchogue, NY.

In 2023, Anheuser-Busch InBev sold the brewery to Tilray Brands, as part of a deal that included eight beer and beverage brands.

== See also ==
- Barrel-aged beer
