= Morrisania Hospital =

Defunct Bronx hospital

Coordinates: 40°50′11″N 73°55′9″W

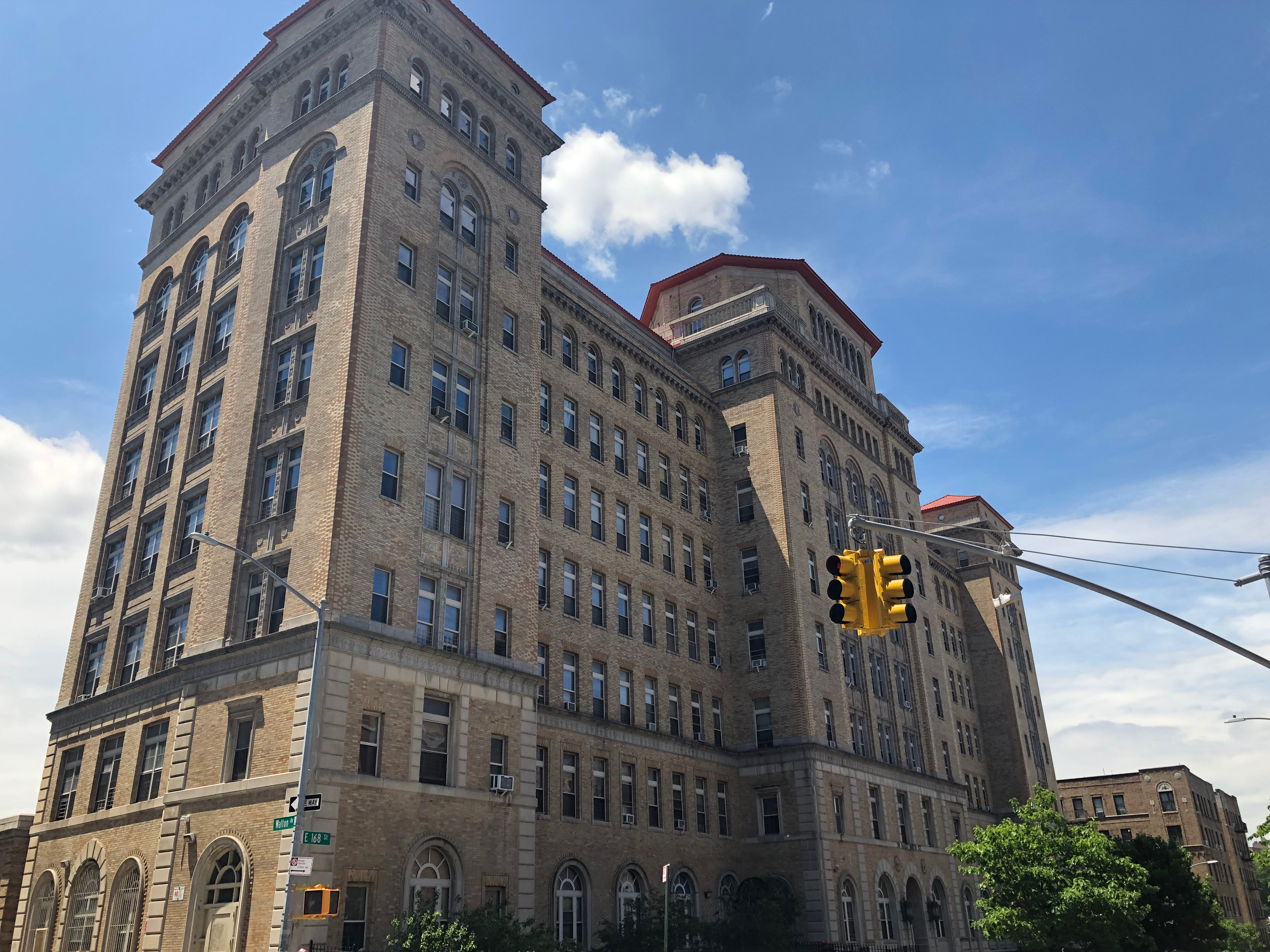

Geography
- Location: The Bronx, New York, United States

Services
- Beds: 311

History
- Opened: 1929
- Closed: 1976

Links
- Lists: Hospitals in New York State

Morrisania Hospital was a four-structure full service hospital with an 11-story main building that was built in 1926 and closed in 1976.

== History ==
Morrisania Hospital was planned in the 1920s when the western Bronx was rapidly urbanizing with the opening of the new subway lines.

In 1933 the Jerome Avenue division of the Lexington Avenue line, running as an elevated train above River Avenue, was joined by the Concourse division of the Sixth Avenue line, planned in the 1920s. The few blocks between the two subway lines was speedily filled with five- and six story apartment houses, making that district the most densely populated in the borough. Dr. Isidore Goldberger and J. Lewis Amster successfully campaigned for a new city hospital to be built in that area.

The city appropriated funds for the new facility in 1922, and Mayor Jimmy Walker laid the cornerstone in 1926. Charles B. Meyers designed a complex that stretched across an entire city block from 167th Street to 168th Street on the hill between Walton and Gerard Avenues. Throughout the decade Meyers had designed a number of new city structures, including several city hospitals. The complex was opened on July 1, 1929.

Meyers placed four major buildings on the site. The main building has its entrance on 168th Street and is in a T configuration. It contained a ten-story 400-bed hospital with galleries of sun parlors that face the south. Flanking the site along Walton and Gerard Avenues were two additional parallel six-story rectangular residence facilities for nurses and employees. At the southern end, along busy commercial 167th Street, was a low-lying powerhouse and laundry with its lower floors below grade to let light into the center courtyard. Near the western end of this building was a massive, tall, tapering, cylindrical brick chimney to allow smoke to rise over the roofs of the nearby apartment houses and the hospital.

Unusually, the brick for all the structures is basically tawny colored, ranging from a light beige to a deep orange. The buildings are decorated with terra cotta bearing various patterns, the main entrance on 168th Street being the most elaborate. A muted red tile tops the roof. The whole exudes the air of a Renaissance Italian palace.

In 1976, in the face of a fiscal crisis, the city closed Morrisania Hospital. It remained vacant for more than two decades. In the 1990s, plans were made to remodel the hospital interior as a residence facility and classrooms for practical home economics and skills.

The powerhouse and laundry building (with its distinctive chimney) was destroyed and replaced with a modern bilingual school. In homage to the older structures on the site, the new school is made of bright orange brick with a bright red tile roof. The former residence on the Gerard Avenue side now houses a medical clinic, a reminder of the site’s original purpose and a resumption of some of the services the hospital had provided.

The hospital, which had a separate structure for laundry, opened in 1929 as a 400-bed facility, three years after it was built. By the time it closed, Morrisania was described as a 311-bed facility.

"After more than 20 years of sitting empty" the hospital's structure was converted to an apartment building.
