= Blue Point (building) =

Skyscraper in Warsaw, Poland

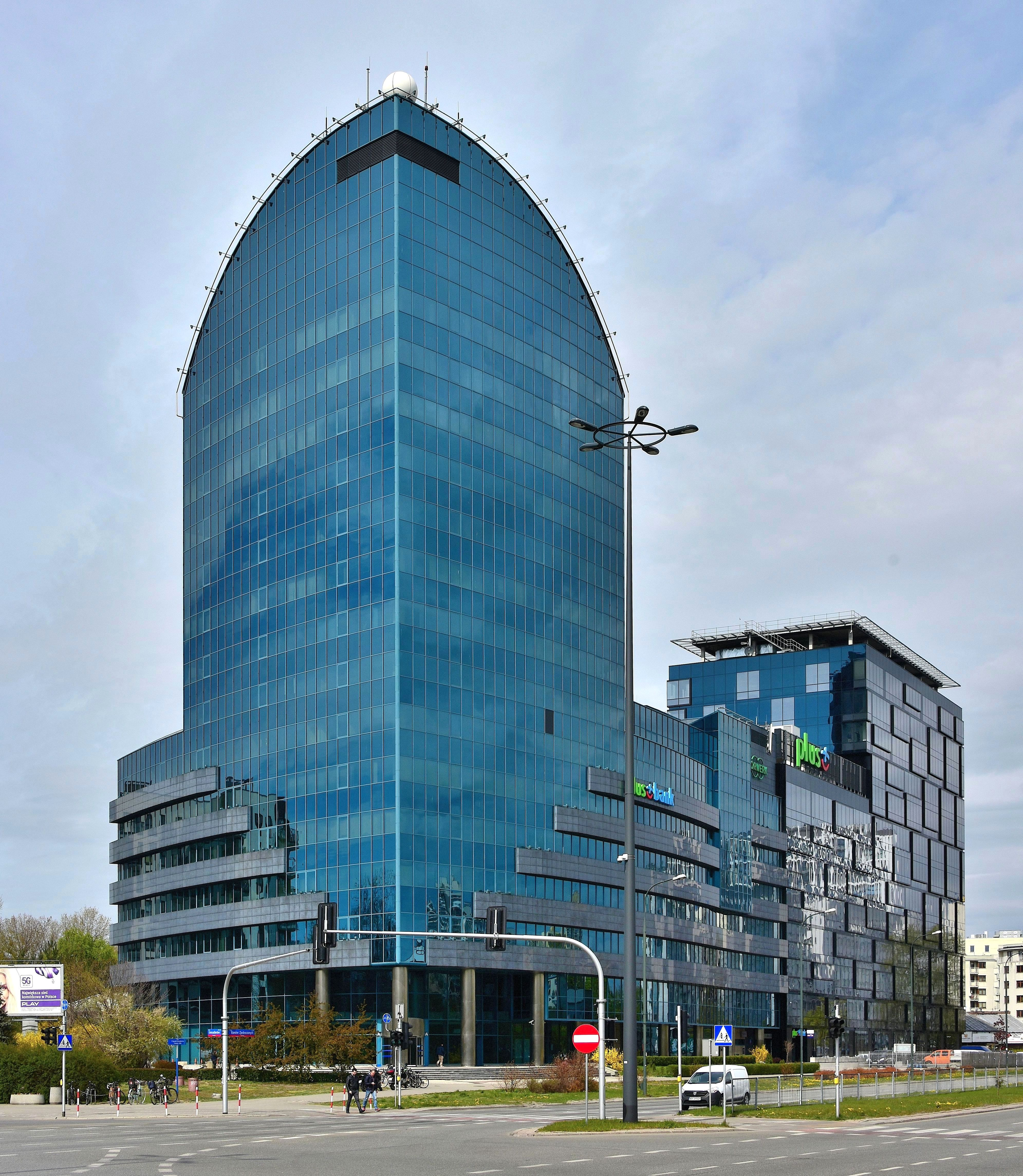
- Blue Point in 2019.

General information
- Type: Office
- Location: 61A Stanów Zjednoczonych Avenue, Praga-South, Warsaw, Poland
- Coordinates: 52°14′29.26″N 21°04′55.84″E
- Completed: 2001

Height
- Architectural: 65 metres (213 ft)

Technical details
- Floor count: 18 (+1 underground)
- Floor area: 24,306 m^{2} (261,630 sq ft)

Design and construction
- Architect: Wojciech Jankowski
- Developer: Pezetel Development Warszawa

Blue Point is an office skyscraper building in the city of Warsaw, Poland. It is located at 61A Stanów Zjednoczonych Avenue, at the crossing with Grenadierów Street, in the Praga-South district, within the neighbourhood of Grochów-Kinowa and the CIS area of Grochów. It was completed in 2001. To the northeast, it is connected to the office building to Blue Point 2, built in 2016 at 61 Stanów Zjednoczonych Avenue.

== History ==
The building was developed by the investment company Pezetel Development Warszawa, and was designed by architect Wojciech Jankowski. Its construction was finished in 2001.

In 2005, in the building temporarily housed the headquarters of the Frontex, an agency of the European Union, which exercises the border control of the Schengen Area.

It was built next to a 7-storey office building at 61 Stanów Zjednoczonych Avenue, owned by the company Pezetel, constructed in 1976. Between 2013 and 2016, it was rebuilt into Blue Point 2, a 14-storey office building, connected to the skyscraper Blue Point.

== Characteristics and design ==
The skyscraper has 18 storeys and measures the height of 65 m (213.3 ft). The building has a total floor area of 24,306 m^{2} (261,627.61 sq ft), of which 16,000 m^{2} (172,222.6 sq ft.) is used for office spaces, and 450 m^{2} (4,843.76 sq ft) for commercial and service spaces. The building also has a 1-storey-tall underground car park with 300 parking spaces.

To the northeast, it is connected to Blue Point 2, 14-storey office building at 61 Stanów Zjednoczonych Avenue.
