= Briarcliffe College–Patchogue =

Former campus of Briarcliffe College

Coordinates: 40.7665°N 73.0210°W

Briarcliffe College - Patchogue
- Type: For Profit
- Active: 1966–2018
- Address: 225 West Main Street; Patchogue, New York, 11772, Patchogue, New York, United States
- Affiliations: American Accounting Association, American Association of Collegiate Registrars and Admissions Officers, American Association for Higher Education, American Association of University Women, American College Counselors’ Association, American Counselors’ Association, American Council on Education, American Electronics Association (AeA), American Library Association, American Psychological Association, Association for Institutional Research, Association for Computing Machinery, Association of Graphic Communication, Association of Proprietary Colleges, Association for Student Judicial Affairs, Bethpage Chamber of Commerce, Business Teachers’ Association of New York State, Career College Association, Computing Technology Industry Association, Council for Higher Education Accreditation, Data Processing Management Association, Eastern Association of Student Financial Aid Administrators and Greater Patchogue Chamber of Commerce
- Website: www.bcpat.com

Briarcliffe College - Patchogue was a campus of Briarcliffe College located in Patchogue, New York, on the south shore of Long Island in Suffolk County. It offered associate and bachelor degree coursework, covering areas including accounting, business administration, criminal justice, computer programming, graphic design, word processing and office technologies. The campus permanently closed in 2018.

== History ==
Briarcliffe College was founded in 1966 to help Long Island resident’s with their higher education needs and prepare them for the growing business world. In 1980, following an influx in the Long Island population, the Briarcliffe College – Patchogue campus was established. With this addition, the Patchogue campus offered day and evening classes, which was responsible for the growth in adult students.

== Academics ==
Briarcliffe College – Patchogue offered a variety of programs:

- Accounting Program

Briarcliffe College - Patchogue offers both a Diploma and Associate in Applied Science degree in accounting. The Accounting Program focuses on building strong accounting skills and stress business knowledge.

- Business Administration Program

The Business Administration Program offer an Associate in Applied Science and a Bachelor of Business Administration degree. Students can learn the business, professional, communication and technical skills needed to be successful in the business world today.

- Computer Programming

Briarcliffe College - Patchogue offers students a Certificate in Computer Programming. This program teaches students the front and back-end of programming, writing, testing and debugging techniques.

- Computer Service Technician

The Computer Service Technician Diploma Program at Briarcliffe College – Patchogue offers students the opportunity to learn installation, maintenance and support for computer systems. Those that graduate from this program can pursue careers as contractors or self-employed professionals.

- Criminal Justice Program

Briarcliffe College – Patchogue offers a Criminal Justice Program to students who have a passion for investigative work, technology and public service. By earning an Associate of Science degree, students can pursue a career in fields such as security and corrections.

- Graphic Design Program

The Graphic Design Program at Briarcliffe College – Patchogue offers students the opportunity to earn an Associate in Applied Science degree. Students are able to study both traditional and digital design with courses ranging from theory to emerging communication technology.

- Word Processing Secretarial

Students at Briarcliffe College - Patchogue can choose to earn a Diploma in Word Processing Secretarial. Those who graduate from this program should be able to obtain entry-level employment in the administration field and/or create career flexibility and pursue advancement opportunities.

- Office Technologies Program

Briarcliffe College – Patchogue offer students an Office Technologies Program with the choice of a legal, medical or computer tech concentration. Graduates will receive an Associate in Applied Science degree and will be prepared for a position in the business and office environments.

== Admissions ==
Admissions into Briarcliffe College – Patchogue may be granted upon completion of an application and a personal interview. Prospective students must also submit an application fee of $35.00.

== Accreditation ==
Briarcliffe College - Patchogue is a higher education institution that is accredited by the Commission on Higher Education of the Middle States Association of Colleges and Schools, located at 3624 Market St., Philadelphia 19104. Briarcliffe College – Patchogue is also authorized to offer Diploma, Associate degree and bachelor's degree programs.

== Organizations ==
Students that attend Briarcliffe College - Patchogue have numerous extracurricular the options, such as social groups, students government. Currently, the college offers no sports and is a member of the United States Collegiate Athletic Association.
