= Mohawk Valley General Hospital =

Defuncthospital

Geography
- Location: Ilion, New York, United States

Services
- Beds: 84

History
- Opened: 1908
- Closed: closed

Links
- Lists: Hospitals in New York State

Mohawk Valley General Hospital was an 84-bed hospital owned "by two adjoining towns." It was located in the village of Ilion, New York, a part of Herkimer Country.

== History ==
The cornerstone for what was formerly known as Ilion Hospital and subsequently Mohawk Valley General Hospital (sometimes referred to as Mohawk Valley Hospital) was laid in 1908. In 1981, when New York State attempted to merge Mohawk with Herkimer County's two other hospitals, there were two obstacles: The smallest of the three was privately owned, the largest of them was owned by a village, and Mohawk was owned by the adjoining towns of "German Flatts and Frankfort." Deficits accumulated, and in 1991 operation of the hospital was given to Faxton St. Luke's Healthcare, a multi-site health system that subsequently affiliated with still other hospitals.

The hospital was closed, and the building was sold to St. Luke's for conversion to medical/dental offices. Another hospital, in an adjacent county, is planned for completion in 2023.

== See also ==
- Mohawk Valley Health System
