= Rye Psychiatric Hospital Center =

Mental health hospital

Coordinates: 40.97216°N 73.69148°W

Geography
- Location: Rye, New York, United States

Organization
- Type: Specialist

Services
- Speciality: Psychiatric hospital

History
- Opened: 1973
- Closed: by 2014

Links
- Lists: Hospitals in New York State

Rye Psychiatric Hospital Center was a 34-bed investor-owned mental health facility located in Rye, New York.

== History ==
The name Rye Psychiatric Hospital Center was incorporated in 1973. By 2014 they had closed.

Rye had provided "services for the mentally ill". Patients included those with addictions, and whose "behavior represents a danger to himself and others".

A famous patient 'vanished' from their facility, a lunatic asylum which The New York Times described as a Sanitarium. The hospital is sometimes referred to as "Rye Hospital Center".

== Controversy ==
In 1984 the State of New York claimed that their facility was underutilized (and cut funding); their challenge was rejected.
