= Amsterdam Memorial Hospital =

Former New York State hospital in Amsterdam, New York

Coordinates: 42°57′32″N 74°11′15″W

Geography
- Location: Amsterdam, New York, New York, United States

Organization
- Type: General

History
- Opened: 1889
- Closed: 2009 (merged)

Links
- Lists: Hospitals in New York State

Amsterdam Memorial Hospital is a 19th-century-founded medical facility in upstate New York that merged in 2009 with a nearby hospital, using part of a $20 million state grant to pay off accumulated debt.

== History ==
The 1889-founded Amsterdam merged with the 1903-founded St Mary's Hospital, a nearby hospital, in 2009.

The Amsterdam Memorial facility is primarily for pediatrics and primary care. They had a prior arrangement, initiated in 1993, whereby obstetrical services for its patients were performed at St. Mary's.

== Financials ==
=== 2016 ===
==== Revenues, expenses, assets, and liabilities ====
Expenses

$12,995,151

Net Income

-$9,819,851

Assets/Debt	
Total Assets	$19,332,488
Total Liabilities	$19,332,488
Net Assets	$0

==== Employee compensation ====
Key Employees and Officers	Compensation	Related	Other
Barry Arbuckle (Director, President/Ceo)	$0	$2,207,685	$2,628,816
Richard Graniere (Director, Cio/Treasurer)	$0	$850,620	$1,212,754
Karen Testman (Director, Cfo)	$0	$661,224	$682,894

=== 2015 ===
==== Revenues, expenses, assets, and liabilities ====
Revenue

$717,880

Expenses

$251,831

Net Income

$466,049

Net Assets

$0

Assets/Debt	
Total Assets	$17,205,003
Total Liabilities	$17,205,003
Net Assets	$0

===== Employee compensation =====
Key Employees and Officers	Compensation	Related	Other
Barry Arbuckle (Director, President/Ceo)	$0	$2,074,152	$1,022,573
Richard Graniere (Director, Cio/Treasurer)	$0	$881,083	$322,021
Karen Testman (Director, Cfo)	$0	$632,276	$258,972
