= Eastern Niagara Hospital =

New York (state) hospital system

Lockport Memorial Hospital
- Eastern Niagara Health System

Geography
- Location: Lockport, New York, United States
- Coordinates: 43°10′40″N 78°40′19″W

Organization
- Type: General
- Religious affiliation: Catholic

Services
- Beds: 121

History
- Former names: Lockport City Hospital, Eastern Hospital-Lockport Division
- Opened: 1908 (as Lockport City Hospital)
- Closed: 2023 (as Eastern Niagara Hospital)

Links
- Website: www.enhs.org
- Lists: Hospitals in New York State

Eastern Niagara Hospital was the name created to cover a pair of hospitals founded in the early 1900s in Lockport and Newfane, New York that each operated independently. Under cost pressures they were both operated under the Eastern Niagara Health System (ENHS) umbrella. ENHS also operates a nursing home. In 2019 The New York Times portrayed Eastern as among the least likely to overcharge, yet they were facing cost pressures.

== Lockport Memorial Hospital ==
The Lockport City Hospital opened on July 1, 1908, as an 18-bed medical facility. It was renamed Lockport Memorial Hospital in 1959. In 1999, the Lockport Memorial Hospital and the Newfane Inter-Community Memorial Hospital took on a legal affiliation under the name Eastern Niagara Hospital. By 2009 the new names Eastern Niagara Health System and Eastern Niagara Hospital were being used. Lockport was known as Eastern Niagara Hospital/Lockport Division; the other location was known as the Newfane Division.

In 1999, it was described by The New York Times as "struggling,"

On June 17, 2023, Eastern Niagara Hospital closed their Lockport hospital. As a result of a collaboration with Catholic Health, a temporary emergency room was opened in the Town of Lockport on June 18, 2023. This temporary emergency room would serve the Lockport community until the new Lockport Memorial Hospital would open in Fall 2023.

=== Newfane Division ===
The Eastern Niagara Hospital/Newfane Division was previously known as Inter-Community Memorial Hospital. In 2019 this facility was closed as part of filing for bankruptcy protection, although another hospital indicated at the time that they'd take it over.

== Lockport Memorial Hospital: A Campus of Mount St. Mary's Hospital ==
Catholic Health broke ground for a new hospital in 2021 in collaboration with Eastern Hospital System. The new hospital named Lockport Memorial Hospital opened in the Town of Lockport on October 10, 2023. It is a Campus of Mount Saint Mary's Hospital.

=== Services ===
The new Lockport Memorial Hospital provides the following services: X-Ray, CT Scan, Ultrasound, Mammography, Bone Densitometry, Laboratory, Primary Care, Cardiology, OB/GYN, General Surgery, Ear/Note/Throat, Orthopedics, Neurology, Endocrinology, Emergency Services

Also, the new hospital has a helipad which allows for transport to other medical facilities. The separate Express Care facility closed upon opening of the new hospital.

Plans are currently underway to create an emergency vehicle access road from Route 93 (Lockport Bypass) to expedite hospital access for ambulances and other emergency vehicles.
