= Adirondack Regional Hospital (Corinth) =

New York (state) hospital system

Coordinates: 43.2444°N 73.8133°W

Geography
- Location: Corinth, New York, United States

Services
- Beds: 50

History
- Opened: 1964
- Closed: 1967

Links
- Lists: Hospitals in New York State

Adirondack Regional Hospital was a 50-bed 1964-proposed medical facility built in upstate New York's Corinth.

== History ==
Adirondack became eligible for payments from Medicare and Medicaid in 1967. The reasons they closed included money matters and insufficient utilization.

Their Corinth location became Adirondack Clinic.
