= Nicholas H Noyes Memorial Hospital =

Geography
- Location: Dansville, Livingston County, New York, United States
- Coordinates: 42.5527°N 77.69786°W

Services
- Beds: 72

History
- Opened: 1890

Links
- Website: www.noyes-health.org
- Lists: Hospitals in New York State

Nicholas H Noyes Memorial Hospital is a 72-bed acute care hospital in Dansville, New York, and provides health services to residents of Livingston, Allegany, Steuben and surrounding counties.

== History ==
The hospital traces its history to Dr. George Ahlers of Pittsburgh who in 1890 organized the first hospital in Dansville with assistance from Dr. Roswell Park of Buffalo, New York. Dansville Medical and Surgical Hospital was located in what is now known as Kings Daughters and Sons building. In 1911 the hospital closed, and was reopened in 1913 as a proprietary hospital in the Colonial Inn, by Miss Elizbeth Swartz. In 1920 the Colonial Inn was incorporated as Dansville General Hospital.

Nicholas H. Noyes Memorial Hospital was named for Nicholas H. Noyes in 1972 due to a generous contribution. Mr. Noyes grew up in Dansville and spent most of his adult life in Indianapolis where he worked for the Eli Lily Company. In 1951, Mr. Noyes and his wife established a charitable foundation in Indianapolis, the Noyes Jr. Memorial Foundation, Inc., in memory of their son, Nicholas Noyes Jr., who died in a boathouse fire in 1939 at the age of 28.

The organization comprises Nicholas H Noyes Memorial Hospital in Dansville, Noyes Health Services in Geneseo, New York, and Noyes Lab Draw Station in Lakeville, New York.

Notable physician groups at the institution are Tri-County Family Medicine; Arif Qureshi MD and Omar Qureshi MD, Radiology; Asad Majid MD, Nephrology; Sohail Qureshi MD, Internal Medicine.
