= Herkimer Memorial Hospital =

Defunct hospital - Site currently houses a nursing home

Coordinates: 43°01′33″N 74°59′57″W

Geography
- Location: Herkimer County, New York, United States

Organization
- Type: General

Services
- Beds: 70

History
- Opened: 1925
- Closed: 1983

Links
- Lists: Hospitals in New York State

Herkimer Memorial Hospital was a 70-bed located in Herkimer County, New York. In 1981, an oversight agency determined that this hospital, "the smallest of three serving the Mohawk Valley, should be converted from an acute-care facility into a nursing home." None of them wished to change. Herkimer closed in 1983.

== History ==
Herkimer "opened in 1925, completed a substantial addition in 1965" and, along with the other pair of local hospitals, "It is generally agreed that all three hospitals in the valley take good care of their patients." Herkimer Memorial Hospital was, at the time of its closing, still "the largest employer in the village." The hospital's staff included 21 physicians and 40 nurses; they had an "intensive cardiac care" unit.

=== Valley Health Services ===
Valley Health Services (VHS) "opened on April 1, 1984 with 32 beds" as a nursing home for long-term care, using the Herkimer facility; a month later this increased to 64 beds, and subsequently 128 and then 160. By 2017 they had also added an additional 32 beds for specialized care short-term rehab.
