= Adirondack Medical Center =

Hospital system in New York, U.S.

Adirondack Medical Center - Saranac Lake
- Adirondack Health

Geography
- Location: 2233 State Route 86, Saranac Lake, New York, United States
- Coordinates: 44°20′45″N 74°08′36″W

History
- Opened: 1913

Links
- Website: www.adirondackhealth.org
- Lists: Hospitals in New York State

Lake Placid Health and Medical Fitness Center
- Adirondack Health

Geography
- Location: 203 Old Military Road, Lake Placid, New York, United States
- Coordinates: 44°15′57″N 73°59′01″W

Links
- Website: www.adirondackhealth.org/location/lake-placid-health-and-medical-fitness-center
- Lists: Hospitals in New York State

Adirondack Medical Center is a multi-site medical system with facilities in Lake Placid, New York, Saranac Lake, New York, and other locations. The original Lake Placid facility was replaced by a new one; and the site of the old facility was demolished to build a sports complex for the 2023 Winter World University Games.

== History ==
One of the hospital's units, General Hospital of Saranac Lake, was established in 1913.

Adirondack Medical Center was formed in 1989 by the merging of General Hospital of Saranac Lake with Placid Memorial Hospital. Both sites continued to provide medical services until 2018. At that time, with a new hospital scheduled to open in Lake Placid, the demolition of the old Placid facility was announced; a sports facility for the 2023 Winter Olympics is the planned use of the site. The name Adirondack Health Center in Lake Placid applies to the new facility there, which also has "a large fitness center."

In 2018 Adirondack had sought "$325,816 to offset the cost of rehabilitating its Annex building" to "provide pulmonary rehabilitation and physical therapy services on the main campus" but "did not receive" anything from a $763 million statewide funding allocation that gave $64 million to their region. By contrast, in 2015 the hospital was granted $2.3 million for other expansion work.

== Controversy ==
In 1996, an Alzheimer's patient at the Saranac Lake facility had the surgery on the wrong hip. In 2001, five years later, Adirondack had a repeat incident that led to a change in pre-surgery preparation.
