= List of hospitals in New York (state) =

Counties of New York

This is a list of hospitals in the U.S. state of New York. The hospitals are listed by the most recent hospital name with the name of the health system, county, city, date the hospital first opened, and most recent number of beds, when known. For defunct hospitals, the closing date is included, when known. Military hospitals and psychiatric hospitals are listed separately. More detailed descriptions are in the lists of hospitals in New York City's five boroughs and separate articles for many notable hospitals.

The American Hospital Directory lists 261 active hospitals in New York State in 2022. 210 of these hospitals have staffed beds, with a total of 64,515 beds. The largest number of hospitals are in New York City. The January 1, 2022 listing by the New York Health Department of general hospitals covered by the New York Healthcare Reform Act show 165 hospitals 63 closed hospitals, and 51 hospitals that had been merged with other hospitals.

The oldest hospital in New York State and also oldest hospital in the United States is the Bellevue Hospital in Manhattan, established in 1736. The hospital with the largest number of staffed beds is the NewYork-Presbyterian Hospital in Manhattan, with 2,678 beds in its hospital complex.

== Hospitals ==
The notable hospitals in New York are listed below using the current name of the hospital and previous names described in footnotes. This list is sortable by name, county, city, date opened and number of beds. The range of number of beds in hospitals goes from the multi-campus NewYork-Presbyterian Hospital in Manhattan with 2,678 beds to Mercy Ambulatory Care Center in Orchard Park with only two beds. The number of beds for each hospital since the beginning of the COVID-19 pandemic has fluctuated, so references are included.

Hospitals in New York
Name	Health system	County	City	Coordinates	Opened	Beds, refs
A.O. Fox Memorial Hospital	Bassett Healthcare Network	Otsego	Oneonta	42°27′29″N 75°3′8″W	1900	67
A.O. Fox Memorial Hospital, Tri-Town Campus (Note: The Tri-Town Campus of A.O. Fox Memorial Hospital only has an emergency department.)	Bassett Healthcare Network	Delaware	Sidney	42°18′16″N 75°23′44″W		0
Adirondack Medical Center	Adirondack Health	Essex	Saranac Lake	44°20′45″N 74°08′36″W	1913	39
Albany Medical Center	Albany Med Health System	Albany	Albany	42°39′12.42″N 73°46′31.54″W	1849	734, 605
Albany Memorial Hospital (Note: Albany Memorial Hospital merged with Samaritan Hospital.)	Northeast Health System	Albany	Albany	42°40′27″N 73°44′54″W	1868	73, 165
Alice Hyde Medical Center	University of Vermont Health Network	Franklin	Malone	44°51′26″N 74°17′30″W	1913	76, 22
Arnot Ogden Medical Center	Arnot Health	Chemung	Elmira	42°6′1″N 76°49′41″W	1888	112
Auburn Community Hospital	Independent	Cayuga	Auburn	42°56′29″N 76°33′53″W	1878	99, 78
Bellevue Hospital	NYC Health + Hospitals	New York	Manhattan	40°44′21″N 73°58′31″W	1736	844
Bellevue Woman's Hospital	Ellis Medicine	Schenectady	Schenectady	42°47′35″N 73°52′43″W	1931	55
Bertrand Chaffee Hospital	Catholic Health	Erie	Springville	42°30′35″N 78°39′32″W		103, 14
Binghamton General Hospital	United Health Services	Broome	Binghamton	42°05′12″N 75°54′54″W	1887	220
Blythedale Children's Hospital	Independent	Westchester	Valhalla	41°4′28″N 73°48′0″W	1913	86
Bon Secures Hospital (Note: Bon Secures Hospital was previously known as Mercy Community Hospital, Port Jervis.)	WMCHealth	Orange	Port Jervis	41°22′04″N 74°40′55″W		169
BronxCare Health System (Note: BronxCare Health System was formerly Bronx-Lebanon Hospital Center.)	BronxCare Health System	Bronx	The Bronx	40°50′37″N 73°54′39″W	1890	415
Brookdale University Hospital and Medical Center	MediSys Health Network	Kings	Brooklyn	40°39′18″N 73°54′45″W	1921	530
Brooklyn Hospital Center	Mount Sinai Health System	Kings	Brooklyn	40°41′24″N 73°58′38″W	1845	464
Brooks Memorial Hospital	Brooks TLC Hospital System	Chautauqua	Dunkirk	42°28′53″N 79°20′04″W	1900 (about)	65, 34
Buffalo General Medical Center	Kaleida Health	Erie	Buffalo	42°54′05″N 78°51′54″W	1858	1068, 518
Burke Rehabilitation Hospital	Montefiore Health System	Westchester	White Plains	41°00′56″N 73°45′08″W	1915	150
Calvary Hospital	Independent	Bronx	The Bronx	40°50′52.9″N 73°50′38.8″W	1899	225
Canton-Potsdam Hospital	St. Lawrence Health System	St. Lawrence	Potsdam	44°40′36″N 74°58′56″W	1985	94
Carthage Area Hospital	Carthage Area Hospital Community Partners Primary Healthcare Network	Jefferson	Carthage	43°59′14″N 75°35′38″W	1965	25
Catskill Regional Medical Center (Callicoon)	Garnet Health	Sullivan	Callicoon	41°45′09″N 75°02′46″W		15, 25
Catskill Regional Medical Center (Harris)	Garnet Health	Sullivan	Harris (near Monticello)	41°42′39″N 74°44′14″W	1967	166
Cayuga Medical Center, Ithaca (Note: Cayuga Medical Center was originally known as Tompkins Community Hospital, which was established before 1970.)	Cayuga Health System	Tompkins	Ithaca	42°28′14″N 76°32′16″W	1980	193
Claxton-Hepburn Medical Center (Note: The Claxton-Hepburn Medical Center opened in 1885 as the Ogdensburg City Hospital and Orphan Asylum.)	Independent	St. Lawrence	Ogdensburg	44°41′29″N 75°29′58″W	1885	66
Clifton Springs Hospital & Clinic	Rochester Regional Health	Ontario	Clifton Springs	42°57′38″N 77°08′11″W	1972	203, 262
Clifton-Fine Hospital	Samaritan Health	St. Lawrence	Star Lake	44°09′45″N 75°03′22″W	1951	20
Cobleskill Regional Hospital	Bassett Healthcare Network	Schoharie	Cobleskill	42°44′24″N 74°29′22″W	1956	25
Coler-Goldwater Specialty Hospital	NYC Health + Hospitals	New York	Manhattan	40°46′13″N 73°56′32″W	1939	1025
Cohen Children's Medical Center	Northwell Health	Nassau	New Hyde Park	40°45′11″N 73°42′30″W	1983	202
Columbia Memorial Hospital	Albany Med Health System, Columbia Memorial Health (Note: Columbia Memorial Health is affiliated with the Albany Medical Center, which is part of Albany Med Health System.)	Columbia	Hudson	42°14′48″N 73°46′39″W	1889	206, 90
Community Memorial Hospital		Madison	Hamilton	42°48′48″N 75°32′35″W	1952	23
Coney Island Hospital	NYC Health + Hospitals	Kings	Brooklyn	40°35′07″N 73°57′56″W	1875	371
Crouse Hospital		Onondaga	Syracuse	43°02′30″N 76°08′19″W	1887	502, 255
Cuba Memorial Hospital	Kaleida Health	Allegany	Cuba	42°12′47″N 78°17′16″W	1923	81 20
Delaware Valley Hospital	United Health Services	Delaware	Walton	42°09′53″N 75°07′43″W	1951	25, 19
Dobbs Ferry Pavilion	St. John's Riverside Hospital	Westchester	Dobbs Ferry	41°00′57″N 73°51′43″W	1893	50
Eddy Cohoes Rehabilitation Center	Eddy Village Green	Albany	Cohoes	42°46′49″N 73°43′31″W		94
E.J. Noble Hospital, Gouverneur	St. Lawrence Health System (Note: E.J. Noble Hospital in Gouverneur was previously known as Gouverneur Hospital.)	St. Lawrence	Gouverneur	44°20′16″N 75°28′25″W		25
E.J. Noble Hospital (River Hospital), Alexandria Bay	St. Lawrence Health System (Note: E.J. Noble Hospital in Alexandria Bay is also known as River Hospital.)	Jefferson	Alexandria Bay	44°20′16″N 75°55′14″W		15
Elizabethtown Community Hospital	University of Vermont Health Network	Essex	Elizabethtown	44°12′58″N 73°35′46″W		25
Ellenville Regional Hospital	Independent	Ulster	Ellenville	41°44′00″N 74°22′46″W	1966	25, 51
Ellis Hospital	Ellis Medicine	Schenectady	Schenectady	42°49′13″N 73°54′57″W	1893	398, 368, 203
Elmhurst Hospital Center	NYC Health + Hospitals	Queens	Elmhurst, Queens	40°44′41″N 73°53′11″W	1957	525
Erie County Medical Center	Great Lakes Health System	Erie	Buffalo	42°55′33″N 78°49′54″W	1912	330
F F Thompson Hospital	UR Medicine, Thompson Health	Ontario	Canandaigua	42°52′35″N 77°17′23″W	1904	236
Faxton Hospital	Mohawk Valley Health System	Oneida	Utica	43°05′49″N 75°16′34″W	1875	0
Flushing Hospital Medical Center	MediSys Health Network	Queens	Flushing, Queens	40°45′20″N 73°49′01″W	1953	271, 312
Franklin Hospital Medical Center (Note: Franklin Hospital Medical Center merged with Long Island Jewish Medical Center.)	Northwell Health	Nassau	Valley Stream	40°41′31″N 73°41′04″W		
Fulton Medical Center	Oswego Health System	Oswego	Fulton	43°18′54″N 76°24′24″W	2011	
Garnet Health Medical Center	Garnet Health	Orange	Middletown	41°26′32″N 74°22′06″W	1887	383
Geneva General Hospital	Finger Lakes Health	Ontario	Geneva	42°52′36″N 76°59′17″W	1898	132
Glen Cove Hospital	Northwell Health	Nassau	Glen Cove	40°52′15″N 73°37′21″W	1921	119
Glens Falls Hospital	Albany Med Health System	Warren	Glens Falls	43°18′23″N 73°38′48″W	1897	410, 180
Good Samaritan Hospital (Suffern)	WMCHealth	Rockland	Suffern	41°6′42″N 74°8′7″W	1902	286
Good Samaritan University Hospital (West Islip)	Catholic Health	Suffolk	West Islip	40°41′46.2″N 73°17′40.5″W	1959	537
Gouverneur Health	NYC Health + Hospitals	New York	Manhattan	40°42′47″N 73°59′17″W	1885	25
Gracie Square Hospital	NewYork-Presbyterian	New York	Manhattan	40°46′11″N 73°57′10″W	1959	157
Guthrie Corning Hospital	Guthrie	Steuben	Corning	42°8′3.8″N 76°58′1.2″W	1900	65, 67
Guthrie Cortland Medical Center	Guthrie	Cortland	Cortland	42°36′31.7″N 76°11′15.0″W	1891	44, 57
Harlem Hospital Center	NYC Health + Hospitals	New York	Manhattan	40°48′51″N 73°56′25″W	1887	272
HealthAlliance Hospital: Broadway Campus	WMCHealth	Ulster	Kingston	41°55′36″N 73°59′43″W	1891	147, 111
HealthAlliance Hospital: Mary’s Avenue Campus	WMCHealth	Ulster	Kingston	41°55′18″N 73°59′56″W	1902	149
Helen Hayes Hospital	NewYork-Presbyterian	Rockland	West Haverstraw	41°12′50″N 73°59′18″W	1900	155
Henry J. Carter Specialty Hospital and Nursing Facility	NYC Health + Hospitals	New York	East Harlem, Manhattan	40°48′11″N 73°56′28″W	2013	365
Horton Medical Center	Garnet Health	Orange	Middletown	41°26′32″N 74°22′06″W	1892	
Hospital for Special Surgery	NewYork-Presbyterian	New York	Manhattan	40°45′55″N 73°57′15″W	1863	205
Hudson Valley Hospital	NewYork-Presbyterian	Westchester	Cortlandt Manor	41°17′33″N 73°53′35″W	1889	128
Huntington Hospital	Northwell Health	Suffolk	Huntington	40°52′47″N 73°25′00″W	1916	280
Interfaith Medical Center (Note: Interfaith Medical Center was formed in 1982 with the merger of Brooklyn Jewish Hospital and Medical Center and St. John's Episcopal Hospital.)	Interfaith Medical Center	Kings	Brooklyn	40°40′47″N 73°56′14″W	1845	243
Ira Davenport Memorial Hospital	Arnot Health	Steuben	Bath	42°22′28″N 77°16′44″W	1910	6
Jacobi Medical Center	NYC Health + Hospitals	Bronx	The Bronx	40°51′22″N 73°50′47″W	1955	457
Jamaica Hospital Medical Center	MediSys Health Network	Queens	Jamaica, Queens	40°42′02″N 73°48′58″W	1891	402
Golisano Children's Hospital of Buffalo	Kaleida Health	Erie	Buffalo	42°54′02″N 78°52′03″W	2014	185
Jones Memorial Hospital	UR Medicine	Allegany	Wellsville	42°07′23″N 77°57′03″W	?	28
Kings County Hospital Center	NYC Health + Hospitals	Kings	Brooklyn	40°39′24″N 73°56′42″W	1831	627
Kingsbrook Jewish Medical Center	Kingsbrook Healthcare System	Kings	Brooklyn	40°39′32″N 73°56′00″W	1925	303
Lenox Hill Hospital	Northwell Health	New York	Manhattan	40°46′25″N 73°57′39″W	1869	449
Lewis County General Hospital	St. Joseph's Health	Lewis	Lowville	43°47′46″N 75°29′59″W	1931	25
Lincoln Hospital	NYC Health + Hospitals	Bronx	The Bronx	40°49′N 73°55′W	1839	362
Little Falls Hospital	Bassett Healthcare Network	Herkimer	Little Falls	43°02′40″N 74°50′51″W		18
Lockport Memorial Hospital	Catholic Health	Niagara	Lockport, New York		2023	10-20
Long Island Jewish Medical Center	Northwell Health	Nassau	New Hyde Park	40°45′21″N 73°42′25″W	1954	1382, 195
Long Island Jewish Forest Hills	Northwell Health	Queens	Forest Hills, Quens	40°43′45″N 73°51′05″W	1953	227
Long Island Jewish, Valley Stream (Note: Franklin Hospital Medical Center merged with Long Island Jewish Medical Center.)	Northwell Health	Nassau	North Valley Stream	40°41′25″N 73°41′12″W		337
Maimonides Medical Center	Maimonides Health	Kings	Brooklyn	40°38′28″N 73°59′55″W	1911	711
Maimonides Midwood Community Hospital	Maimonides Health	Kings	Brooklyn	40°36′56″N 73°56′54″W	1929	134
Manhattan Eye, Ear and Throat Hospital	Northwell Health	New York	Manhattan	40°45′51″N 73°57′50″W	1869	13
Margaretville Memorial Hospital	WMCHealth	Delaware	Margaretville	42°08′48″N 74°38′31″W		97, 15
Maria Fareri Children's Hospital	WMCHealth	Westchester	Valhalla	41°05′09″N 73°48′20″W	2004	0
Mary Imogene Bassett Hospital	Bassett Healthcare Network	Otsego	Cooperstown	42°41′44″N 74°55′25″W	1922	180
Massena Memorial Hospital	St. Lawrence Health System	St. Lawrence	Massena	44°56′16″N 74°54′32″W		25
Mather Hospital (Note: Mather Hospital is also known as the John T. Mather Memorial Hospital.)	Northwell Health	Suffolk	Port Jefferson	40°56′20.6″N 73°3′15.7″W	1929	248
Medina Memorial Hospital	Orleans Community Health	Orleans	Medina	43°13′27″N 78°23′51″W	1908	55
Memorial Sloan Kettering Cancer Center	Memorial Sloan Kettering	New York	New York City: Manhattan	40°45′51″N 73°57′25″W	1884	498
Mercy Hospital of Buffalo	Catholic Health	Erie	Buffalo	42°50′53″N 78°48′47″W	1904	470, 225
Kenmore Mercy Hospital	Catholic Health	Erie	Kenmore	42°58′40″N 78°52′48″W	1951	344, 120
Mercy Ambulatory Care Center	Catholic Health	Erie	Orchard Park	42°46′50″N 78°46′21″W		2
Mercy Hospital	Catholic Health Long Island	Nassau	Rockville Centre	40°41′15″N 73°37′53″W	1913	197
Metropolitan Hospital Center	NYC Health + Hospitals	New York	New York City: Manhattan, East Harlem	40°47′5.74″N 73°56′40.94″W	1875	607
MidHudson Regional Hospital (Note: MidHudson Regional Hospital was until 2014 the St. Francis Hospital)	WMCHealth	Dutchess	Poughkeepsie	41°43′07″N 73°55′37″W	1914	243, 125
Millard Fillmore Suburban Hospital	Kaleida Health	Erie	Williamsville	42°59′40″N 78°43′49″W	1974	0, 300
Misericordia Hospital (Note: The Misericordia Hospital, previously Monetefiore Medical Center North Division, was formerly the Our Lady of Mercy Medical Center, until 2008.)	Montefiore Health System	Bronx	New York City: The Bronx: Wakefield	40°53′38″N 73°51′40″W	1887	345
Monroe Community Hospital (MCH)	Monroe County	Monroe	Rochester	43°6′47″N 77°37′5″W	1933	566
Montefiore Medical Center	Montefiore Health System	Bronx	The Bronx	40°52′49.35″N 73°52′44.67″W	1884	1530, 2059
Montefiore New Rochelle Hospital (Note: Montefiore New Rochelle Hospital was formerly Sound Shore Medical Center of Westchester.)	Montefiore Health System	Westchester	New Rochelle	40°54′51″N 73°47′16″W		301
Montefiore Nyack Hospital	Montefiore Health System	Rockland	Nyack	41°05′46″N 73°55′34″W	1895	251
Morgan Stanley Children's Hospital (Note: Morgan Stanley Children's Hospital was formerly Babies' Hospital in the City of New York until 2003.)	NewYork-Presbyterian	New York	Manhattan	40°50′23″N 73°56′28″W	1887	299
Mount Sinai Hospital	Mount Sinai Health System	New York		40°47′24″N 73°57′12″W	1852	1141
Mount Sinai Morningside	Mount Sinai Health System	New York	Morningside Heights	40°48′20″N 73°57′42″W	1850	495
Mount Sinai Queens	Mount Sinai Health System	Queens	Queens	40°46′06″N 73°55′29″W	1898	235
Mount Sinai South Nassau (Note: Mount Sinai South Nassau was formerly called South Nassau Communities Hospital.)	Mount Sinai Health System	Nassau	Oceanside	40°39′07.2″N 73°37′51.1″W	1928	378, 312
Mount Sinai West	Mount Sinai Health System	New York	New York	40°46′12″N 73°59′15″W	1871	514
Mount Saint Mary's Hospital	Catholic Health	Niagara	Lewiston	43°09′15″N 79°01′57″W	1907	175
Nassau University Medical Center	Nassau Healthcare Corporation	Nassau	East Meadow	40°43′33.9816″N 73°33′17.5788″W	1974	1069, 631, 284
Nathan Littauer Hospital	Colonial Healthcare Corp	Fulton	Gloversville	43°04′22″N 74°19′54″W	1894	142, 35
Newark-Wayne Community Hospital	Rochester Regional Health	Wayne	Newark	43°03′36″N 77°06′08″W	1921	121, 78
NewYork-Presbyterian Queens	NewYork-Presbyterian	Queens	Flushing, Queens	40°44′54″N 73°49′31″W	1892	482
NewYork-Presbyterian Hospital: Columbia University Irving Medical Center; Weill Cornell Medical Center	NewYork-Presbyterian	New York	Manhattan	40°45′58″N 73°57′19″W	1771	2678
NewYork-Presbyterian Westchester (Note: NewYork-Presbyterian Westchester was formerly NewYork-Presbyterian Lawrence Hospital, and before that Lawrence Hospital Center)	NewYork-Presbyterian	Westchester	Bronxville	40°56′32″N 73°50′12″W	1909	238
NewYork-Presbyterian Lower Manhattan Hospital	NewYork-Presbyterian	New York	Manhattan	40°42′37″N 74°0′18″W	1853	170
NewYork-Presbyterian Brooklyn Methodist Hospital	NewYork-Presbyterian	Kings	Brooklyn	40°40′03″N 73°58′43″W	1881	591
New York Eye and Ear Infirmary	Mount Sinai Health System	New York	Manhattan	40°44′01″N 73°59′06″W	1820	69
Niagara Falls Memorial Medical Center	Independent	Niagara	Niagara Falls	43°05′41″N 79°02′58″W		133
Nicholas H Noyes Memorial Hospital	UR Medicine	Livingston	Dansville	42°33′10″N 77°41′53″W	1890	72, 45
North Central Bronx Hospital	NYC Health + Hospitals	Bronx	Norwood, Bronx	40°52′55″N 73°52′52″W	1976	200
North Shore University Hospital	Northwell Health	Nassau	Manhasset	40°46′39″N 73°42′06″W	1953	791
Northern Dutchess Hospital	Nuvance Health	Dutchess	Rhinebeck	41°56′13″N 73°54′49″W		84, 56
Northern Westchester Hospital	Northwell Health	Westchester	Mount Kisco	41°11′53″N 73°43′34″W	1916	241
NYU Langone Hassenfeld Children's Hospital	NYU Langone Health	New York	Manhattan	40°44′31.09″N 73°58′26.52″W	2018 (Hassenfeld) (Note: The NYU School of Medicine, which is part of NYU Langone Health, was founded in 1841. It was renamed the Grossman School of Medicine in 2019.)	102 (Note: The total number of beds in NY Langone Health hospitals is 1,350.)
NYU Langone Kimmel Pavilion	NYU Langone Health	New York	Manhattan	40°44′38″N 73°58′21″W	2018	374
NYU Langone Orthopedic Hospital (Note: NY Langone Orthopedic Hospital was formerly the Hospital for Joint Diseases.)	NYU Langone Health	New York	Manhattan	40°44′04″N 73°58′59″W	1905	160
NYU Langone Tisch Hospital	NYU Langone Health	New York	Manhattan	40°44′37″N 73°58′27″W	1962	1639
NYU Langone Hospital – Brooklyn	NYU Langone Health	Kings	Brooklyn	40°38′48″N 74°01′14″W	1883	450
NYU Langone Hospital — Long Island (Note: NYU Langone-Long Island was previously known as Nassau Hospital and NYU Winthrop Hospital.)	NYU Langone Health	Nassau	Mineola	40°44′24″N 73°38′34″W	1896	591
NYU Langone Hospital — Suffolk (Note: NYU Langone Hospital — Suffolk was formerly known as Long Island Community Hospital and opened under the name Brookhaven Memorial Hospital.)	NYU Langone Health	Suffolk	Patchogue	40°46′55″N 72°58′34″W	1956	306
O'Connor Hospital	Bassett Healthcare Network	Delaware	Delhi	42°16′08″N 74°54′58″W		23, 16
Olean General Hospital	Kaleida Health	Cattaraugus	Olean	42°05′26″N 78°25′40″W	1912	388, 186, 112
Oneida Health Hospital	Oneida Health	Madison	Oneida	43°04′40″N 75°39′14″W		261, 31
Orbis International Flying Eye Hospital	Orbis International	New York	Manhattan	40°45′14″N 73°59′31″W		
Orange Regional Medical Center	Garnet Health	Orange	Middletown	41°26′34″N 74°22′06″W		
Oswego Hospital	Oswego Health System	Oswego	Oswego	43°27′19″N 76°31′01″W	1881	164
Our Lady of Lourdes Memorial Hospital	Ascension	Broome	Binghamton	42°06′34″N 75°56′31″W	1925	242
Peconic Bay Medical Center (Note: Peconic Bay Medical Center was formerly Central Suffolk Hospital.)	Northwell Health	Suffolk	Riverhead	40°56′09″N 72°40′24″W	1951	184
Phelps Memorial Hospital	Northwell Health	Westchester	Sleepy Hollow	41°06′39″N 73°51′48″W	1950s	200
Plainview Hospital (Note: Plainview Hospital is also known as Northwell University Hospital, Plainview.)	Northwell Health	Nassau	Plainview	40°46′29.31″N 73°28′46.83″W	1961	219, 152
Putnam Hospital Center	Nuvance Health	Putnam	Carmel	41°23′05″N 73°39′48″W		102
Queens Hospital Center	NYC Health + Hospitals	Queens	Jamaica, Queens	40°43′01″N 73°48′16″W	1935	253
Richmond University Medical Center	Mount Sinai Health System	Richmond	Staten Island	40°38′08″N 74°06′22″W	1903	448
Rochester General Hospital	Rochester Regional Health	Monroe	Rochester	43°11′32″N 77°35′11″W	1847	528, 495
Rockefeller University Hospital	Rockefeller University	New York	Manhattan	40°45′41″N 73°57′21″W	1937	
Rome Memorial Hospital	St. Joseph's Health	Oneida	Rome	43°13′50″N 75°26′35″W		171
Roswell Park Comprehensive Cancer Center	National Comprehensive Cancer Network	Erie	Buffalo	42°54′00″N 78°51′56″W	1898	133
Samaritan Hospital	St. Peter's Health Partners	Rensselaer	Troy	42°44′0″N 73°40′21″W	1898	350, 238
Sammaritan Hospital St. Mary's Campus (Note: St. Mary's Hospital in Troy is also known as Seton Health.)	St. Peter's Health Partners	Rensselaer	Troy	42°44′35″N 73°40′34″W		20
Samaritan Medical Center	Samaritan Health	Jefferson	Watertown	43°57′54″N 75°54′52″W	1881	294, 124
Saratoga Hospital	Albany Med Health System	Saratoga	Saratoga Springs	43°05′16″N 73°47′52″W		171
Schuyler Hospital	Cayuga Health System	Schuyler	Montour Falls	42°21′12″N 76°51′34″W		145
Sisters of Charity Hospital (Buffalo)	Catholic Health	Erie	Buffalo		1848	310
Sisters of Charity Hospital, St. Joseph Campus	Catholic Health	Erie	Cheektowaga	42°55′44″N 78°51′02″W		119, 142
Soldiers and Sailors Memorial Hospital of Yates County	Finger Lakes Health	Yates	Penn Yan	42°40′19″N 77°03′38″W	1929	25, 14
South Oaks Hospital	Northwell Health	Suffolk	Amityville	40°41′14″N 73°25′24″W		202
South Shore University Hospital	Northwell Health	Suffolk	Bay Shore	40°43′37″N 73°14′29″W	1911	284
St. Anthony Community Hospital	WMCHealth	Orange	Warwick	41°15′45″N 74°21′28″W		60
St. Catherine of Siena Medical Center	Catholic Health	Suffolk	Smithtown	40°52′11″N 73°13′24″W	1962	536
St. Charles Hospital	Catholic Health	Suffolk	Port Jefferson	40°56′53″N 73°03′39″W	1907	243
St. Francis Hospital & Heart Center	Catholic Health	Nassau	Flower Hill	40°48′21″N 73°40′14″W	1922	364
St. James Hospital	UR Medicine	Steuben	Hornell	42°21′28″N 77°39′48″W	1890	30
St. John's Episcopal Hospital South Shore	Episcopal Health Services	Queens	Far Rockaway, Queens	40°35′58″N 73°45′11″W	1905	209
St. John's Riverside Hospital (Note: In 1994, St. John's Riverside Hospital, affiliated with Yonkers General Hospital, officially merged in 2001 and is now known as the ParkCare Pavilion of St. John's Riverside Hospital.)	St. John's Riverside Hospital	Westchester	Yonkers	40°58′7″N 73°53′10″W	1869	407, 190
St. Joseph's Health Hospital	St. Joseph's Health	Onondaga	Syracuse	43°03′24″N 76°08′57″W	1869	431
St. Joseph's Hospital	Arnot Health	Chemung	Elmira	42°05′32″N 76°47′51″W		176
St. Joseph Hospital	Catholic Health	Nassau	Bethpage	40°43′39″N 73°28′44″W		203, 136
St. Joseph's Medical Center	St. Joseph's Medical Center	Westchester	Yonkers	40°55′52″N 73°53′51″W	1888	271, 532
St. Luke's Cornwall Hospital; Newburgh Campus (Note: Formerly known as St. Luke's Hospital)	Montefiore Health System	Orange	Newburgh	41°30′18″N 74°00′54″W		193
St. Mary's Hospital	St. Mary's Healthcare	Montgomery	Amsterdam	42°57′21″N 74°13′01″W	1903	290, 56
St. Peter's Hospital	St. Peter's Health Partners	Albany	Albany	42°39′22″N 73°48′14″W	1869	482, 408
Staten Island University Hospital, North and South Campus	Northwell Health	Richmond	Prince's Bay, South Beach, Staten Island	40°35′11″N 74°05′07″W	1861	627
Stony Brook Children's Hospital	Stony Brook Medicine	Suffolk	Stony Brook	40°54′36″N 73°06′55″W	1980	0
Stony Brook Southampton Hospital (Note: Stony Brook Southampton Hospital was formerly known as Southampton Hospital.)	Stony Brook Medicine	Suffolk	Southampton	40°53′12″N 72°22′49″W	1909	94, 125
Stony Brook University Hospital	Stony Brook Medicine	Suffolk	Stony Brook	40°54′37″N 73°06′55″W	1980	788
Strong Memorial Hospital	UR Medicine	Monroe	Rochester	43°07′22″N 77°37′28″W	1926	886, 755
SUNY Downstate Medical Center	Downstate Health Sciences University	Kings	Brooklyn	40°39′19″N 73°56′39″W		
Stony Brook Eastern Long Island Hospital	Stony Brook Medicine	Suffolk	Greenport	41°06′38″N 72°21′39″W		90
Sunnyview Hospital and Rehabilitation Center	St. Peter's Health Partners	Schenectady	Schenectady	42°49′21″N 73°54′55″W	1928	115
Syosset Hospital (Note: Syosset Hospital was also known as Northwell Syosset.)	Northwell Health	Nassau	Syosset	40°48′45″N 73°30′32″W		74, 69
United Memorial Medical Center, North Street Campus	Rochester Regional Health	Genesee	Batavia			111, 81
Unity Hospital of Rochester	Rochester Regional Health	Monroe	Rochester	43°11′33″N 77°42′18″W	1975	287, 325
University Hospital of Brooklyn	Downstate Health Sciences University	Kings	Brooklyn	40°39′23″N 73°56′43″W		323
University of Pittsburgh Medical Center Chautauqua (Note: The University of Pittsburgh Medical Center in Jamestown was known as the Women's Christian Association Hospital, Jamestown, until 2016)	UPMC	Chautauqua	Jamestown	42°05′32″N 79°13′53″W	1885	187, 317
Upstate Golisano Children's Hospital	Upstate Health System	Onondaga	Syracuse	43°02′32″N 76°08′23″W		0, 71
Upstate University Hospital	Upstate Health System	Onondaga	Syracuse	43°02′31″N 76°08′23″W	1965	752
Upstate University Hospital Community Campus	Upstate Health System	Onondaga	Syracuse	43°00′28″N 76°10′04″W	1963	306
Vassar Brothers Medical Center	Nuvance Health	Dutchess	Poughkeepsie	41°41′37″N 73°56′08″W	1882	365, 354
Westchester Medical Center	WMCHealth	Westchester	Valhalla	41°05′10″N 73°48′20″W	1977	652
Westfield Memorial Hospital	Allegheny Health Network	Chautauqua	Westfield	42°19′48″N 79°34′11″W	1942	9, 6
White Plains Hospital	Montefiore Health System	Westchester	White Plains	41°1′33″N 73°46′9.5″W	1893	292
Wilson Medical Center	United Health Services	Broome	Johnson City	42°06′57″N 75°57′32″W	1905	280
Woodhull Medical Center	NYC Health + Hospitals	Kings	Brooklyn	40°41′58″N 73°56′33″W	1982	371
Wyckoff Heights Medical Center	Independent	Kings	Brooklyn	40°42′15″N 73°55′2″W	1889	350
Wynn Hospital	Mohawk Valley Health System	Oneida	Utica	43°06′12″N 75°14′16″W	2023	373
Wyoming County Community Hospital	Public, Wyoming County	Wyoming	Warsaw	42°45′16″N 78°07′52″W	1911	197, 43

== Defunct hospitals ==
The following general hospitals in New York are defunct. Defunct VA and psychiatric hospitals are listed in separate sections of this article.

Defunct hospitals in New York
Name	County	City	Coordinates	Opened - closed	Beds
Adirondack Medical Center	Essex	Lake Placid	44°15′57″N 73°59′01″W		
Adirondack Regional Hospital	Saratoga	Corinth	43°14′41″N 73°48′50″W	1964-1967	60
Amsterdam Memorial Hospital (Note: Amsterdam Memorial Hospital merged with St. Mary's Healthcare in Amsterdam.)	Montgomery	Amsterdam	42°57′32″N 74°11′15″W	1889–2009 (Note: The Amsterdam Memorial Hospital merged with St. Mary's Hospital in 2009.)	8
Bayley Seton Hospital (Note: Bayley Seton Hospital merged with Sisters of Charity Medical Center.) (Sisters of Charity)	Richmond	New York City: Staten Island	40°37′20″N 74°04′32″W	1831–1980 (Note: Bayley Setton Hospital became part of Richmond University Medical Center in 1980.)	25
Beth David Hospital	New York (county)	New York City: Manhattan	40°46′55″N 73°57′11″W	1886-1962	
Bethesda Hospital	Steuben	North Hornell	42°20′53″N 77°39′48″W	1920–1970	
Cabrini Medical Center	New York (county)	New York City: Manhattan	40°44′11″N 73°59′02″W	1973–2008	490 (1973)
City Hospital	New York (county)	New York City: Manhattan, Roosevelt Island	40°45′11″N 73°57′31″W	1832–1957	
Columbus Hospital	Erie	Buffalo		1906-1998	
Doctors Hospital	New York (county)	New York City: Manhattan	40°46′35″N 73°56′40″W	1929–2004	
Doctors' Hospital	Richmond	New York City: Staten Island	40°36′10″N 74°5′31″W	1940–2003	71
Eastern Niagara Hospital, Newfane Division (Note: The Newfane Division of Eastern niagara Hospital was formerly the Inter-Community Memorial Hospital) (Eastern Niagara Hospital)	Niagara	Newfane	43°17′19″N 78°42′33″W	1908–2019	?
Eastern Niagara Hospital	Niagara	Lockport, New York		1908-2023	121-134
Ellis Island Immigrant Hospital	New York (county)	New York City: New York Harbor: Ellis Island	40°41′58.4″N 74°2′22.5″W	1902–1951	300
French Hospital	New York (county)	New York City: Manhattan	40°45′02″N 73°59′48″W	1881–1977	
Genesee Hospital	Monroe	Rochester	43°8′59.2″N 77°35′44.2″W	1889–2001	
Gowanda State Hospital (NYDCCS)	Erie	Gowanda	42°29′18″N 78°56′13″W	1894–2021	
Herkimer Memorial Hospital	Herkimer	Herkimer	43°01′33″N 74°59′57″W	1925–1983	70
Island Medical Center	Nassau	Hempstead		1956–2003	
Jewish Maternity Hospital	New York (county)	New York City: Manhattan	40°42′54″N 73°59′06″W	1906–1931	
Jewish Memorial Hospital	Nassau	Inwood	40°51′40″N 73°55′48″W	1898–1982	186
Knickerbocker Hospital	New York (county)	New York City: Manhattan: Harlem	40°48′57″N 73°57′11″W	1862–1979	228
Lafayette General Hospital	Erie	Buffalo		?-1986	
Lakeside Memorial Hospital	Monroe	Brockport		?–2013	
Long Beach Medical Center	Nassau	Long Beach	40°35′41″N 73°39′00″W	?–2012	
Long Island College Hospital	Kings	New York City: Brooklyn	40°41′23″N 73°59′48.3″W	1858–2014	508
Lake Shore Hospital	Chautauqua	Irving	42°33′32″N 79°07′31″W	?–2020	182
Madison Avenue Hospital	New York (county)	New York City: Manhattan	40°46′27.2″N 73°57′48.4″W	1955–1976	
Mary McClellan Hospital	Washington	Cambridge	43°1′32.1″N 73°23′29.5″W	1919–2003	
Millard Fillmore Gates Circle Hospital (Note: Millard Fillmore Hospital became part of the Medical Campus attached to Buffalo General Hospital.)	Erie	Buffalo	42°55′12″N 78°52′01″W	?–2012,	
Mohawk Valley General Hospital	Herkimer	Ilion	43°00′50″N 75°02′17″W	1908–1991	84
Mount Sinai Beth Israel	New York		40.7335°N 73.9826°W	1889–2025	799
Mount Vernon Hospital	Westchester	Mount Vernon	40°54′49″N 73°50′23″W	1890s–1999	
Neponsit Beach Hospital	Queens	New York City: Queens	40°34′07″N 73°51′53″W	1915–1955	
New York United Hospital Medical Center	Westchester	Port Chester		1889–2005	222
North General Hospital	New York (county)	New York City: Manhattan: East Harlem	40°48′12″N 73°56′31″W	1979-2010	
Our Lady of Victory Hospital of Lackawanna	Erie	Lackawanna			
Pan American Hospital	New York (county)	New York City: Manhattan	40°46′55″N 73°57′11″W	1927-1930	
Pearl River General Hospital	Rockland (county)	Pearl River, New York	41°05′56″N 74°01′33″W	closed ~1972	
Seaview Hospital	Richmond	New York City: Staten Island	40°35′30″N 74°7′58″W	1909-1938	
Sheehan Memorial Hospital	Erie	Buffalo	42°53′05″N 78°52′06″W	1884–2012	
Smallpox Hospital	New York (county)	New York City: Manhattan: Roosevelt Island	40°45′6″N 73°57′34″W	1856-1875	100
St. Agnes Hospital	Westchester	White Plains		?–2000	
St. Clare's Hospital	New York (county)	New York City: Manhattan	40°45′54″N 73°59′22″W	1934–2007	
St. Vincent's Catholic Medical Center, Manhattan	New York (county)	New York City: Manhattan	40°44′11″N 73°59′59″W	1849-2010	758
Summit Park Hospital	Rockland	Pomona	41°09′28″N 74°02′25″W	Closed 2015	
Sydenham Hospital	New York (county)	New York City: Manhattan: Harlem	40°48′35″N 73°56′56″W	1892–1980	200
Tioga Community Hospital	Tioga	Waverly		closed 1990	
Tonsil Hospital	New York (county)	New York City: Manhattan		1921-1946	
Tri-County Memorial Hospital (Note: The Tri-County Memorial Hospital was rendered unusable by an August 2009 flood. It was demolished in 2012.)	Erie	Gowanda	42°27′52″N 78°56′36″W	?–2009	
Wadsworth Hospital	New York (county)	New York City: Manhattan: Washington Heights	40°51′09″N 73°55′58″W	1929–1976	25
Westchester Square Medical Center	Bronx	New York City: The Bronx	40°50′27″N 73°50′54″W	1830–2013	
Women and Children's Hospital of Buffalo	Erie	Buffalo		1892-2017	

== Military hospitals ==
As of 2022, there were 11 United States Department of Veterans Affairs hospitals in New York, and one VA hospital that closed in 1950.

VA hospitals in New York
Name	County	City	Coordinates	Opened - closed	Beds
Batavia Veterans Administration Hospital (Note: This hospital is on the National Register of Historic Places in New York state.)	Genesee	Batavia	43°00′42″N 78°11′59″W	1934–1950	
Bath VA Medical Center	Steuben	Bath	42°20′37″N 77°20′46″W	1879	440
Canandaigua VA Medical Center	Ontario	Canandaigua	42°54′05″N 77°16′11″W	1933	218
Central Park Hospital	New York (county)	New York City: Manhattan, Central Park		1862-1865	
James J. Peters VA Medical Center (Note: The James J. Peters VA Medical Center was previously known as Bronx Veterans Hospital and Bronx Veterans Administration Medical Center.)	Bronx	New York City: The Bronx	40°52′02″N 73°54′22″W	1922	311
Northport VA Medical Center	Suffolk	East Northport	40°53′40″N 73°18′29″W	1928	500
Rockefeller War Demonstration Hospital	New York (county)	New York City: Manhattan, Upper East Side		1917-1919	
Samuel S Stratton Albany VA Medical Center	Albany	Albany	42°39′07″N 73°46′21″W	1951	67
Syracuse VA Medical Center	Onondaga	Syracuse	43°02′21″N 76°08′20″W	1953	106
U.S. Army General Hospital No. 1 (Note: U.S. Army General Hospital No. 1 was previously known as Columbia War Hospital.)	Bronx	New York City: The Bronx: Norwood		1917-1919	Over 1,000
VA Hudson Valley Healthcare System, Castle Point Campus	Dutchess	Castle Point	41°32′34″N 73°57′46″W	1924	250
VA Hudson Valley Healthcare System, (Note: The VA Hudson Valley Healthcare System at Montrose is a psychiatric care facility.); Montrose, Franklin Delano Roosevelt Campus	Westchester	Montrose	41°14′18″N 73°55′54″W	1950	
VA New York Harbor Healthcare System, Brooklyn Campus	Kings	New York City: Brooklyn	40°36′31″N 74°01′27″W	1950	153
VA NY Harbor Healthcare System; Margaret Cochran Corbin Campus	New York (county)	New York City: Manhattan	40°44′14″N 73°58′39″W	1954	166
Western New York VA Health Care System	Erie	Buffalo	42°57′05″N 78°48′45″W	1950	199

== Psychiatric hospitals ==
As of 2022, there were 97 operating hospitals in New York that have psychiatric beds. The New York hospitals listed in the table below are or were used solely for psychiatric patients. Defunct hospitals' names are in italics. County, city, coordinates, date the hospital opened, number of beds in most recent data, and references are given for each hospital.

When Pilgrim State Hospital (Pilgrim Psychiatric Center) opened in 1931, it was the largest psychiatric hospital in the United States. At its peak, it had 14,000 patients.

In 2018, there were a total of 11,109 adult in-patient psychiatric beds in New York state and New York City hospitals, including 7,228 beds in general hospitals.

Psychiatric hospitals in New York
Name (health system)	County	City	Coordinates	Opened - closed	Beds
Binghamton State Hospital (New York State Inebriate Asylum)	Broome	Binghamton	42°06′22″N 75°52′06″W	1864–1993	
Bloomingdale Insane Asylum	New York (county)	New York City: Manhattan: Morningside Heights	40°48′31″N 73°57′41″W	1821-1889	
Bronx Psychiatric Center	Bronx	New York City: The Bronx	40°51′09″N 73°50′14″W	1963	156
Brooklyn Children's Psychiatric Center (Note: Brooklyn Children's Psychiatric Center is also referred to as the New York City Children's Center - Behavioral Health.)	Kings	New York City: Brooklyn	40°40′30″N 73°55′15″W	1969	
Brunswick Hospital Center (Note: The New York Department of Health reported that the Brunswick Hospital was closed in 2022.)	Suffolk	Amityville	40°41′5.2″N 73°25′16.6″W	1900s (early)-2022	146, 477(up to in the past)
Buffalo Psychiatric Center	Erie	Buffalo	42°55′48″N 78°52′50″W	1880	159
Capital District Psychiatric Center	Albany	Albany	42°39′17″N 73°46′49″W		105
Central Islip Psychiatric Center	Suffolk	Central Islip	40°45′34″N 73°11′26″W	1889–1996	10,000 (1955)
Central New York Psychiatric Center	Oneida	Marcy	43°13′35″N 75°18′19″W	1977	206
Creedmoor Psychiatric Center	Queens	New York City: Queens: Queens Village	40°44′29″N 73°43′54″W	1912	328
Dannemora State Hospital for the Criminally Insane (Clinton Correctional Facility)	Clinton	Dannemora	44°43′25″N 73°43′15″W	1900-?	550
Edgewood State Hospital	Suffolk	Deer Park	40°46′34″N 73°18′34″W	1940s–1971	
Elmira Psychiatric Center	Chemung	Elmira	42°05′28″N 76°47′41″W		80
Four Winds Psychiatric Hospital	Westchester	Katonah	41°15′48″N 73°37′20″W		175
Four Winds Psychiatric Hospital	Saratoga	Saratoga Springs	43°03′28″N 73°47′04″W		88
Gowanda State Hospital	Erie	Gowanda	42°29′18″N 78°56′13″W	1898–2021	
Harlem Valley State Hospital; Psychiatric hospital	Dutchess	Wingdale	41°38′14″N 73°34′20″W	1924–1994	
Hudson River Psychiatric Center	Dutchess	Poughkeepsie	41°44′24.1″N 73°54′14.6″W	?–2012	
Hudson River State Hospital	Dutchess	Poughkeepsie	41°43′59″N 73°55′41″W	1871-early 2000s	300
Hutchings Psychiatric Center	Onondaga	Syracuse	43°02′45″N 76°08′23″W		154
Kings Park Psychiatric Center	Suffolk	Kings Park	40°54′06″N 73°13′56″W	1885–1996	
Kingsboro Psychiatric Center	Kings	New York City: Brooklyn	40°39′27″N 73°56′17″W	?	163
Kirby Forensic Psychiatric Center	New York (county)	New York City: Manhattan: Ward Island	40°47′22″N 73°55′47″W	?	475
Manhattan Psychiatric Center (New York State Department of Mental Hygiene)	New York (county)	New York City: Manhattan	40°47′21″N 73°55′47″W	1848	509
Matteawan State Hospital for the Criminally Insane	Dutchess	Matteawan	41°31′20″N 73°57′02″W	1892–1977	
Mid-Hudson Psychiatric Forensic Center	Orange	New Hampton	41°24′23″N 74°23′32″W	1916	285
Middletown State Hospital (Note: The Middletown State Hospital was originally known as the Middletown State Homeopathic Hospital.)	Orange	Middletown	41°27′N 74°25′W	1874–2006	
Mohansic State Hospital	Westchester	Yorktown Heights	41°16′44″N 73°49′08″W	1910-1918	
Mohawk Valley Psychiatric Center	Oneida	Utica	43°6′18″N 75°15′12″W	1836	77
New York State Psychiatric Institute	New York (county)	New York City: Manhattan	40°50′38″N 73°56′40″W	1895	21
Pilgrim Psychiatric Center	Suffolk	Brentwood	40°47′48″N 73°17′05″W	1931	273
Queens Children's Psychiatric Center	Queens	New York City: Queens			
Rochester Psychiatric Center	Monroe	Rochester	43°07′36″N 77°36′37″W	1857	174
Rockland Children's Psychiatric Center	Rockland	Orangeburg	41°02′53″N 73°58′09″W		0
Rockland Psychiatric Center	Rockland	Orangeburg	41°03′03″N 73°58′05″W	1926	415
Rye Psychiatric Hospital Center	Westchester	Rye	40°58′20″N 73°41′29″W	1973–2014	
Sagamore Children's Psychiatric Center	Suffolk	Dix Hills	40°47′42″N 73°23′04″W		0
South Beach Psychiatric Center	Richmond	New York City: Staten Island	40°35′03″N 74°04′44″W		507
St. Lawrence Psychiatric Center (Ogdenburg Correctional Facility)	St. Lawrence	Ogdenburg	44°43′31″N 75°26′45″W	1890–1982	108
St. Vincent's Hospital Westchester (St. Joseph's Medical Center)	Westchester	Harrison			0
Syracuse State School	Onondaga	Syracuse		1851–1998	
Utica Psychiatric Center	Oneida	Utica	43°06′18″N 75°15′13″W	1843–1977	380
Western NY Children's Psychiatric Center	Erie	West Seneca	42°49′27″N 78°43′54″W		0
Willard Asylum for the Chronic Insane	Seneca	Willard	42°40′45″N 76°52′46″W	1869–1995	
Willowbrook State School (Note: Willowbrook State School was previously called Halloran General Hospital and Veterans Hospital.)	Richmond	New York City: Staten Island: Willowbrook	40°35′58″N 74°09′02″W	1947–1987	
Zucker Hillside Hospital (Northwell Health)	Queens	New York City: Queens: Glen Oaks	40°45′08″N 73°42′37″W	1926	0

== Health systems ==
- Albany Med, based in Albany
- Bassett Healthcare Network
- Catholic Health, Buffalo (Trinity Health)
- Catholic Health, formerly Catholic Health Services of Long Island
- Cayuga Health System, based in the Finger Lakes Region
- Finger Lakes Health, based in Geneva
- MediSys Health Network, based in Queens
- Mohawk Valley Health System
- Montefiore Health System, based in the Bronx: Hospitals in the Bronx, Westchester and Rockland counties
- Mount Sinai Health System, based in Manhattan: Hospitals in Manhattan, Brooklyn, and Queens
- NewYork-Presbyterian Healthcare System (NYPHS), based in Manhattan: Hospitals in Manhattan, Queens, Bronx, Brooklyn, Westchester County
- Northwell Health, based in Nassau County, hospitals in Manhattan, Nassau, Queens, Staten Island, and Suffolk counties
- Nuvance Health (includes former Health Quest System), based in Mid-Hudson Valley
- NYC Health + Hospitals, operates the NYC public hospitals and clinics as a public benefit corporation
- Oswego Health System, based in Oswego
- Rochester Regional Health System, based in Rochester
- St. Joseph's Health (Syracuse, New York) (Trinity Health), based in Syracuse
- St. Lawrence Health System
- St. Peter's Health Partners (SPHP) (Trinity Health), based in Troy
- Stony Brook Medicine, based in Stony Brook
- United Health Services, based in Binghamton
- UR Medicine Health System, Rochester, New York, based in Rochester
- Westchester Medical Center Health Network (WMCHealth), also known officially as the Westchester County Healthcare Corporation. WMCHealth hospitals are in the lower and mid-Hudson Valley. This network includes three former Bon Secours Charity Health System hospitals.

== See also ==
- List of hospitals in the Bronx
- List of hospitals in Brooklyn
- List of hospitals in Manhattan
- List of hospitals in Queens
- List of hospitals on Staten Island

== Gallery ==
Images of hospitals in alphabetical order
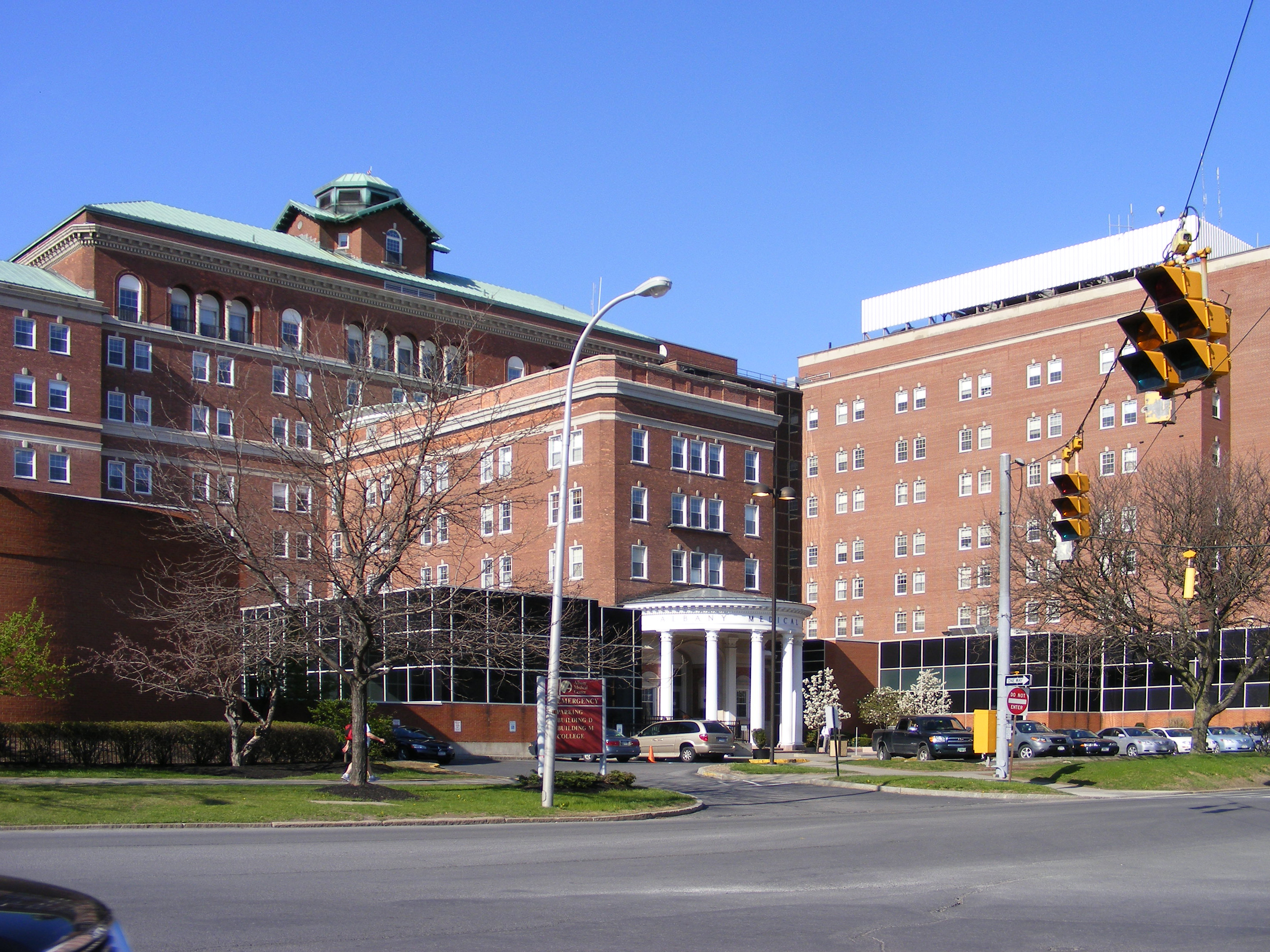
Albany Medical Center (2009)

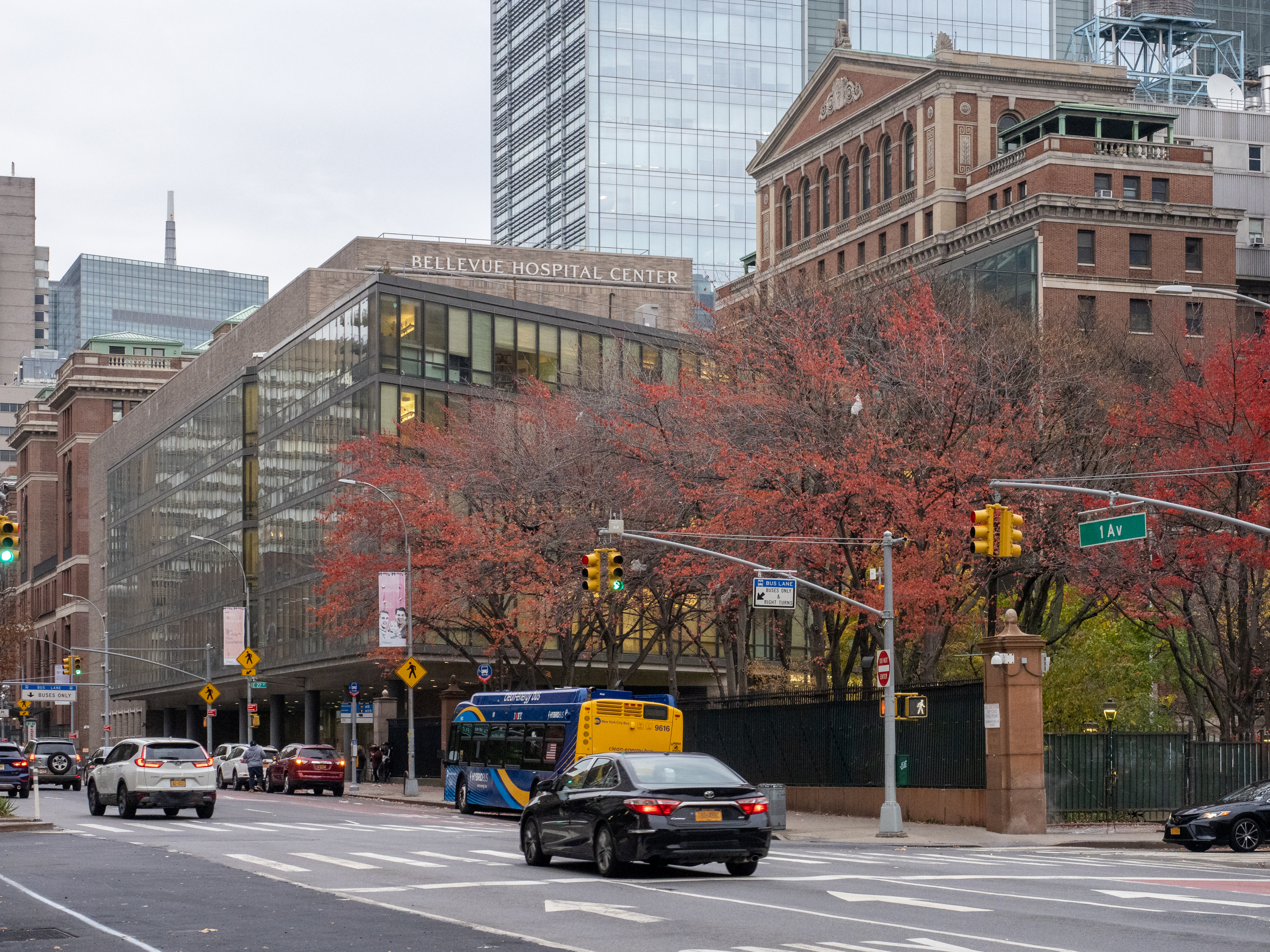
Bellevue Hospital, Manhattan, New York City (2021)

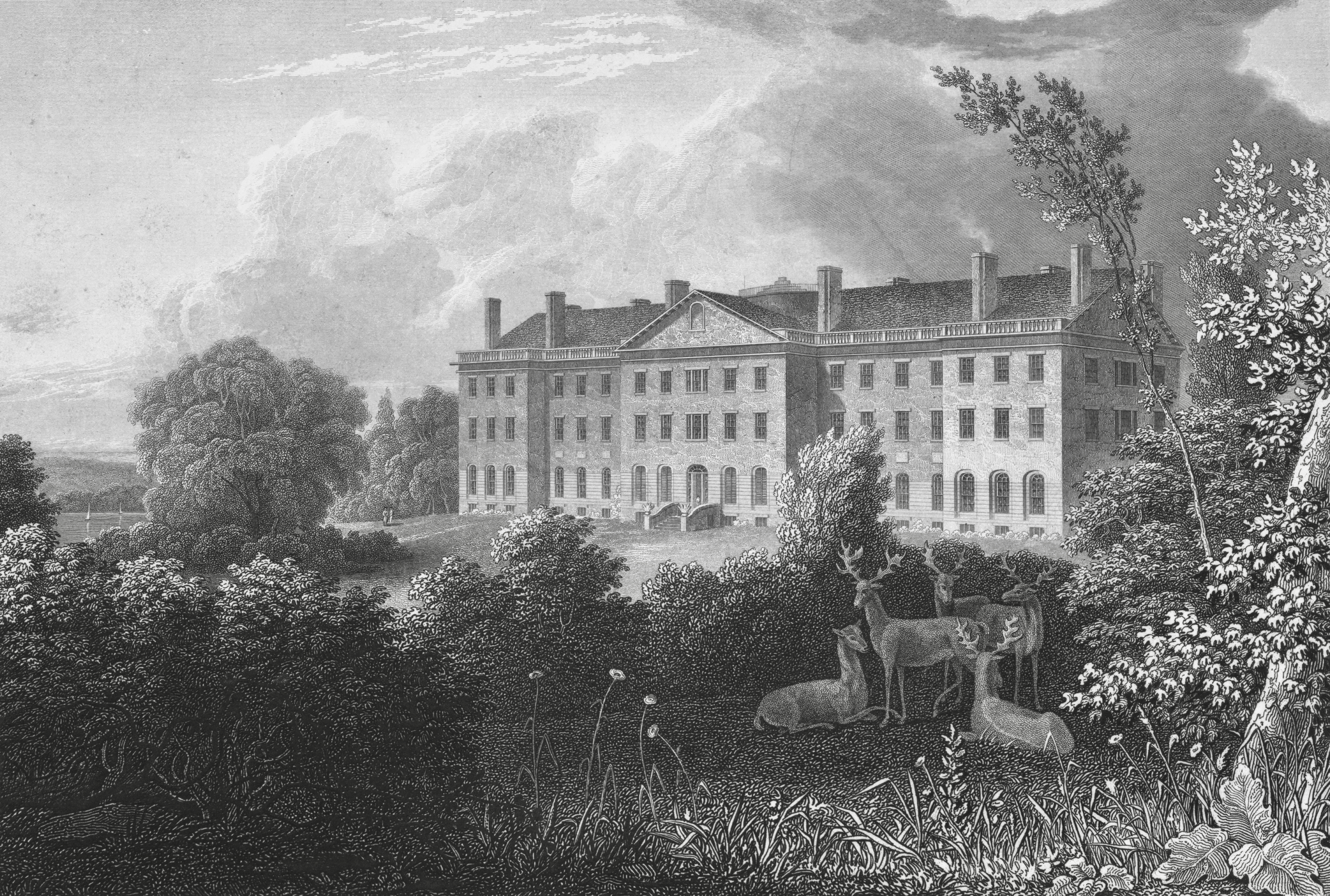
Bloomingdale Insane Asylum (1834)

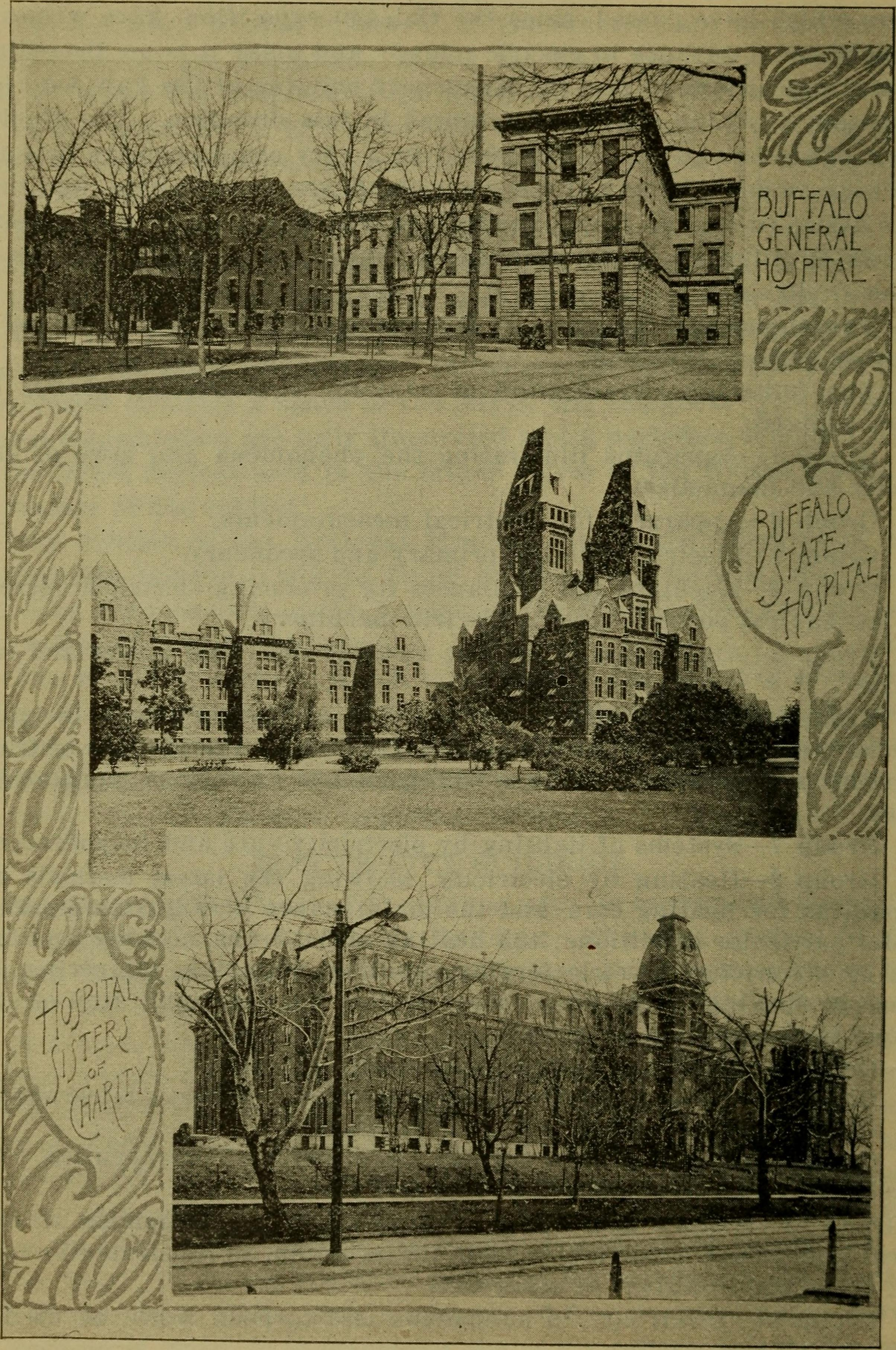
Buffalo General Hospital, Buffalo State Hospital, Sisters of Charity Hospital (1901)

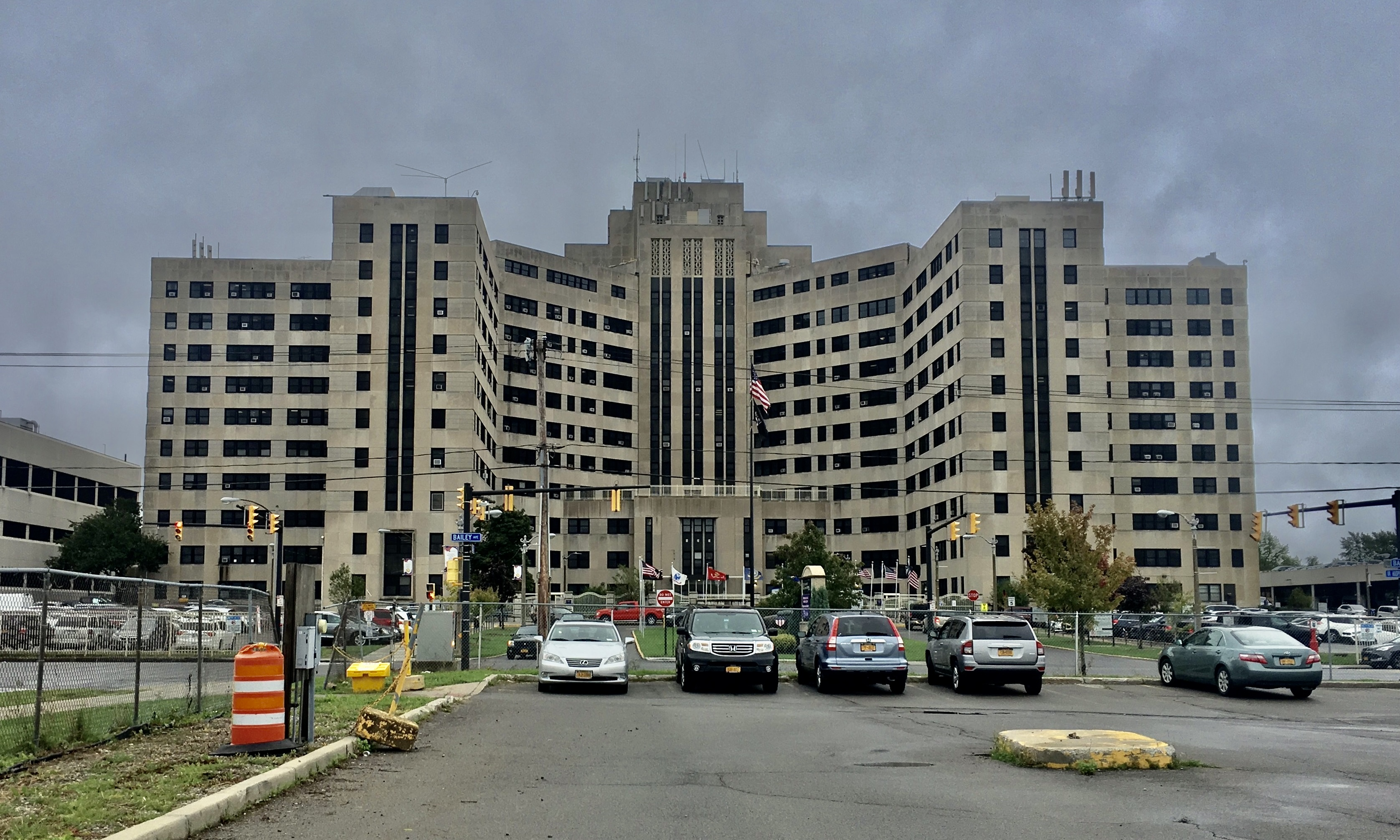
Buffalo VA Medical Center (2019)

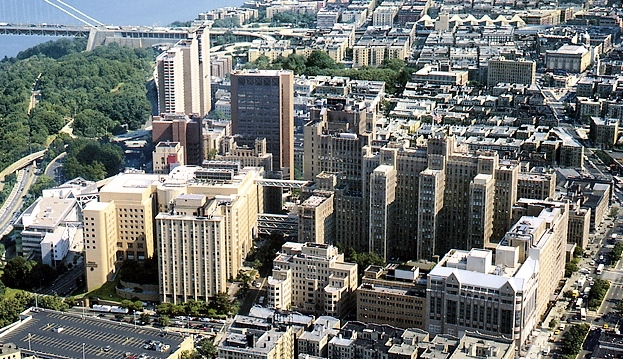
Columbia University Irving Medical Center (2009)

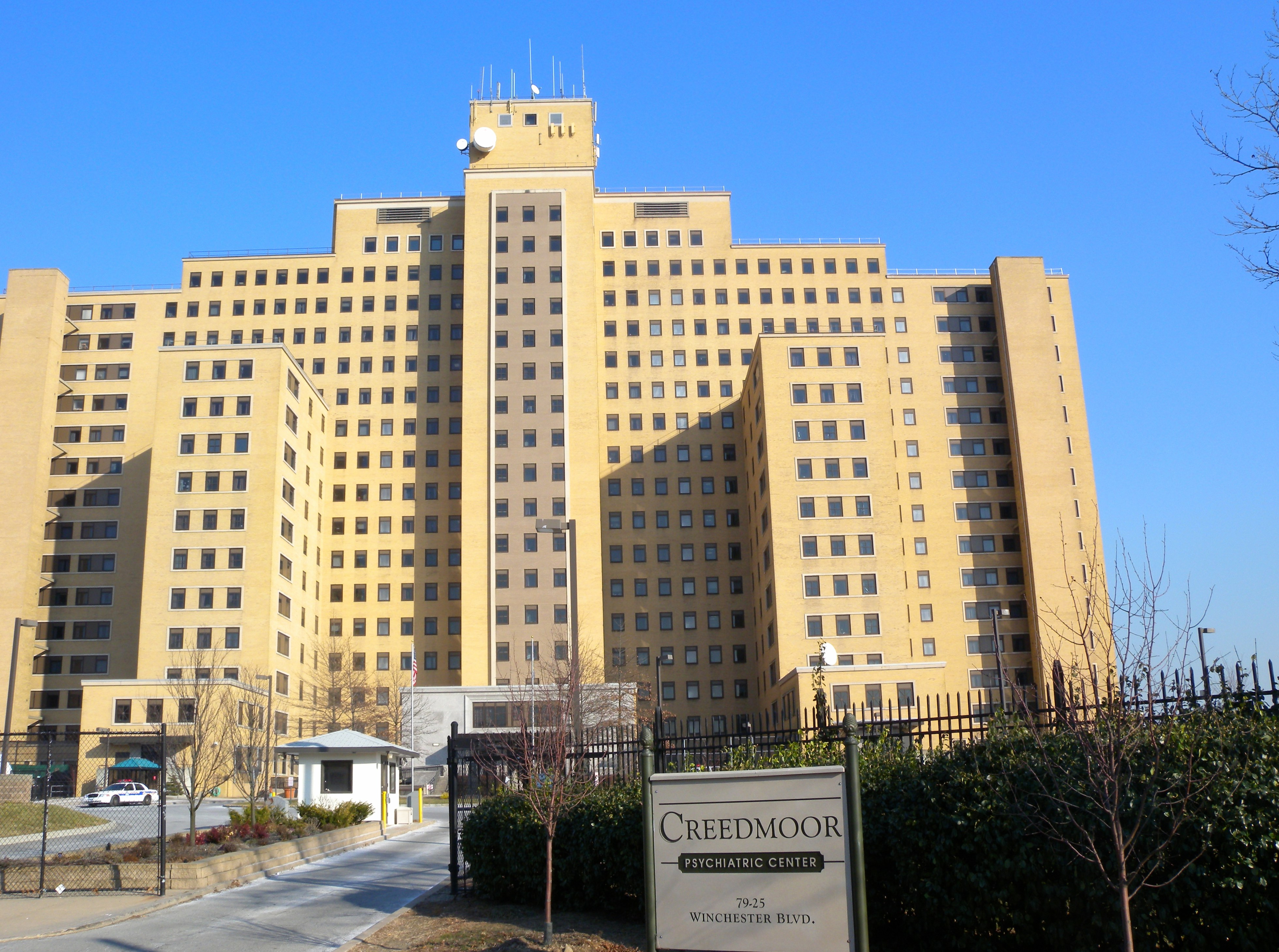
Creemore Psychiatric Center (2010)

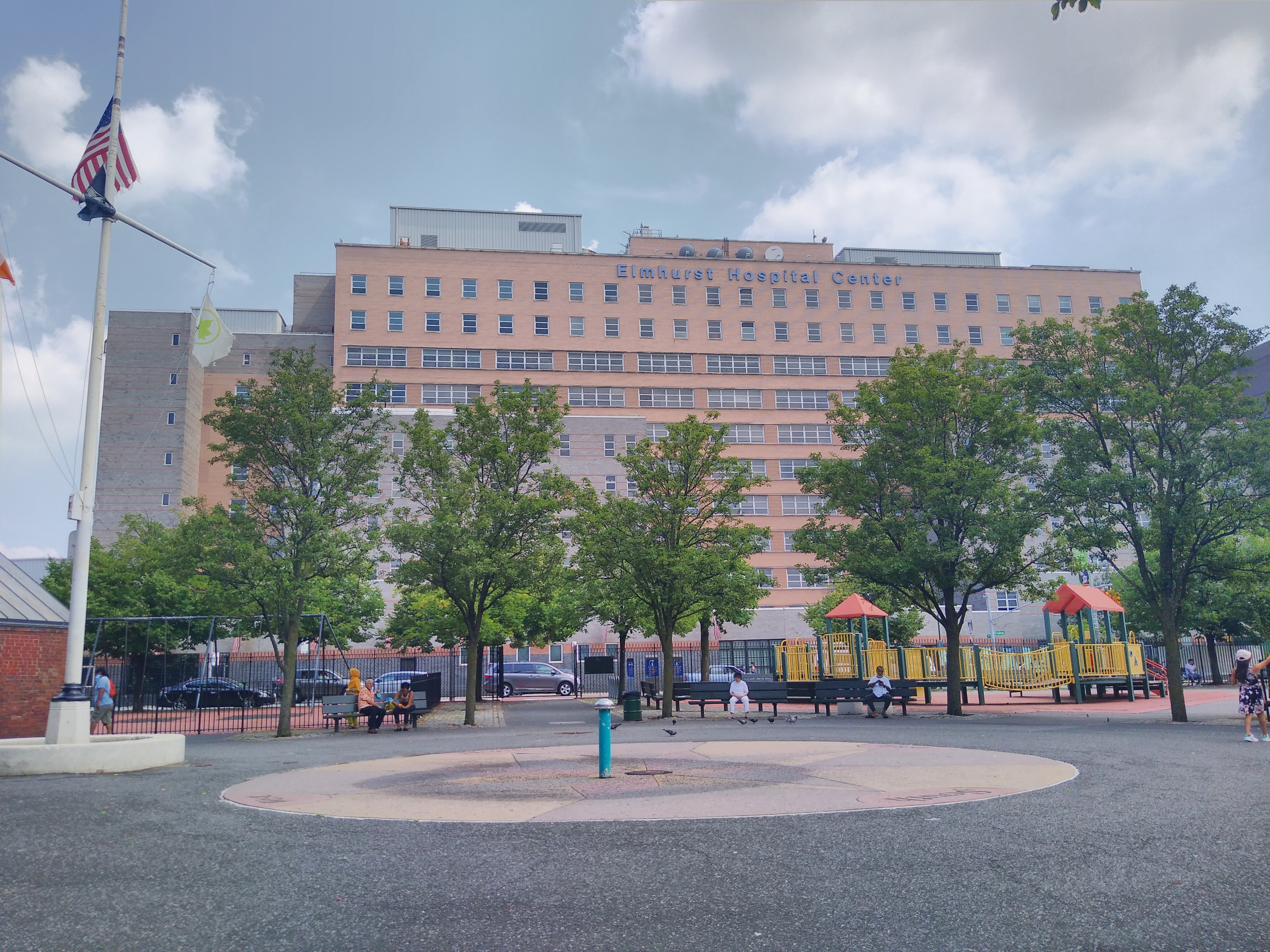
Elmhurst Hospital Center (2020)

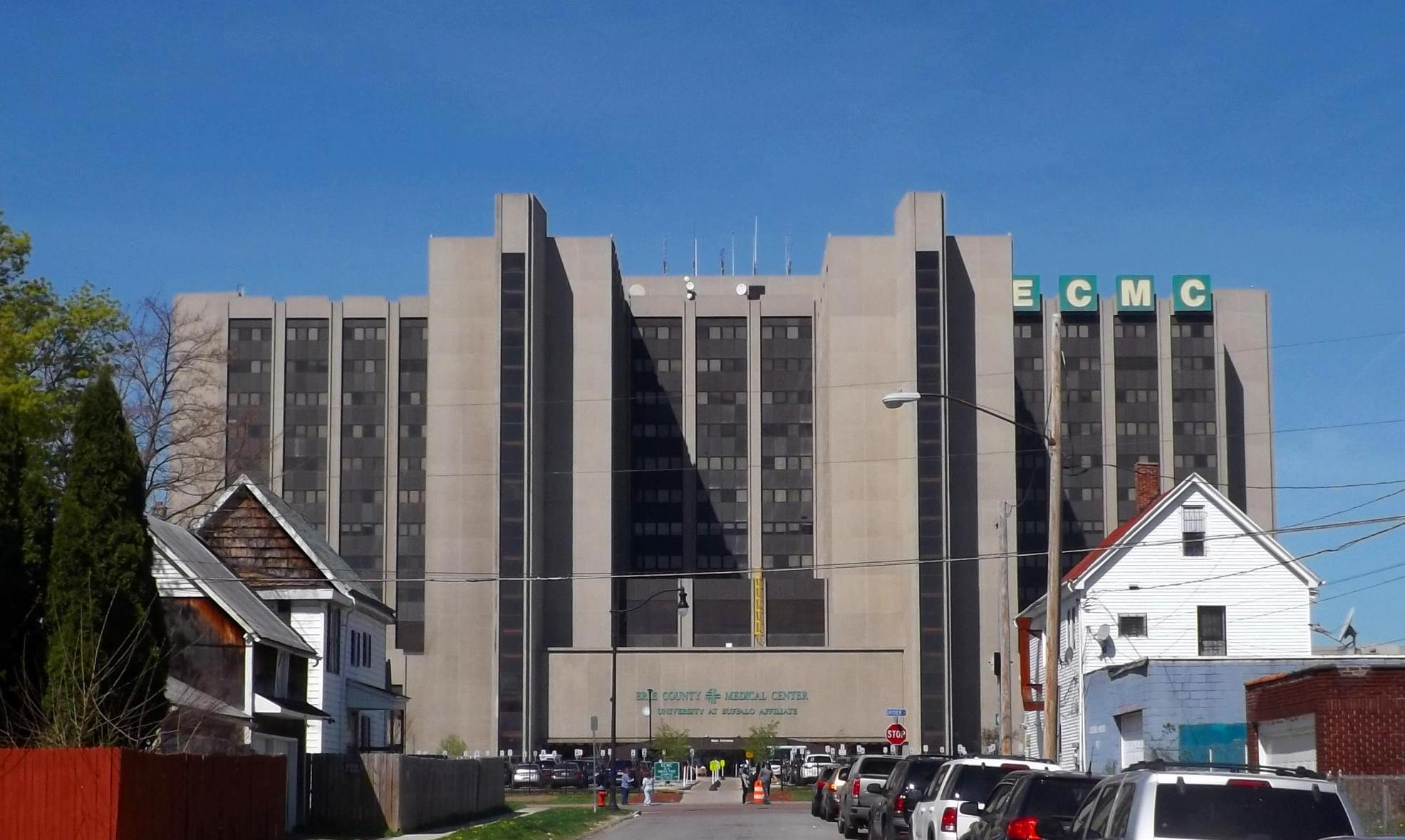
Erie County Medical Center (2013)

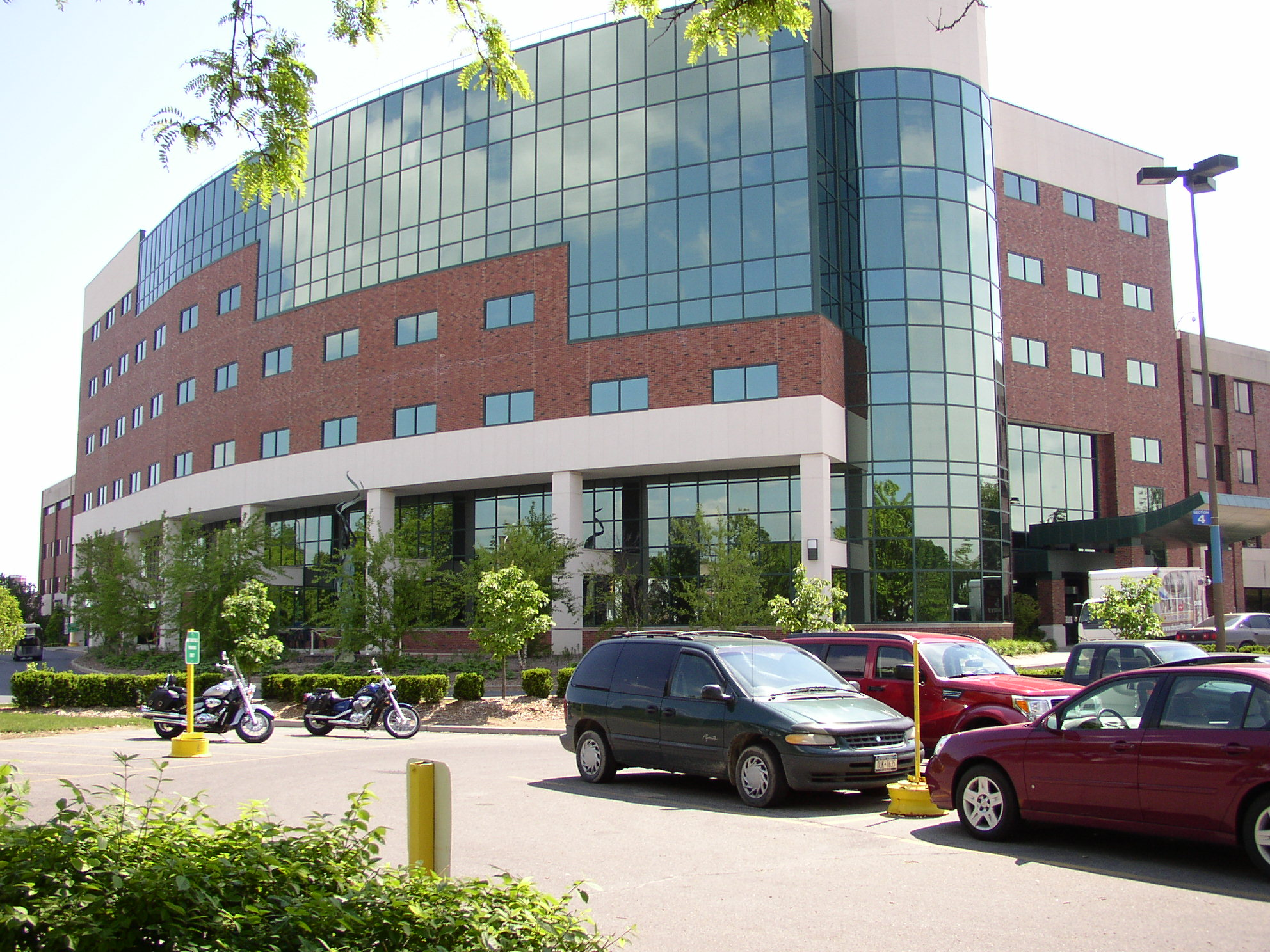
Glens Falls Hospital, northwest tower (2009)

John R. Oishei Children's Hospital (2019)

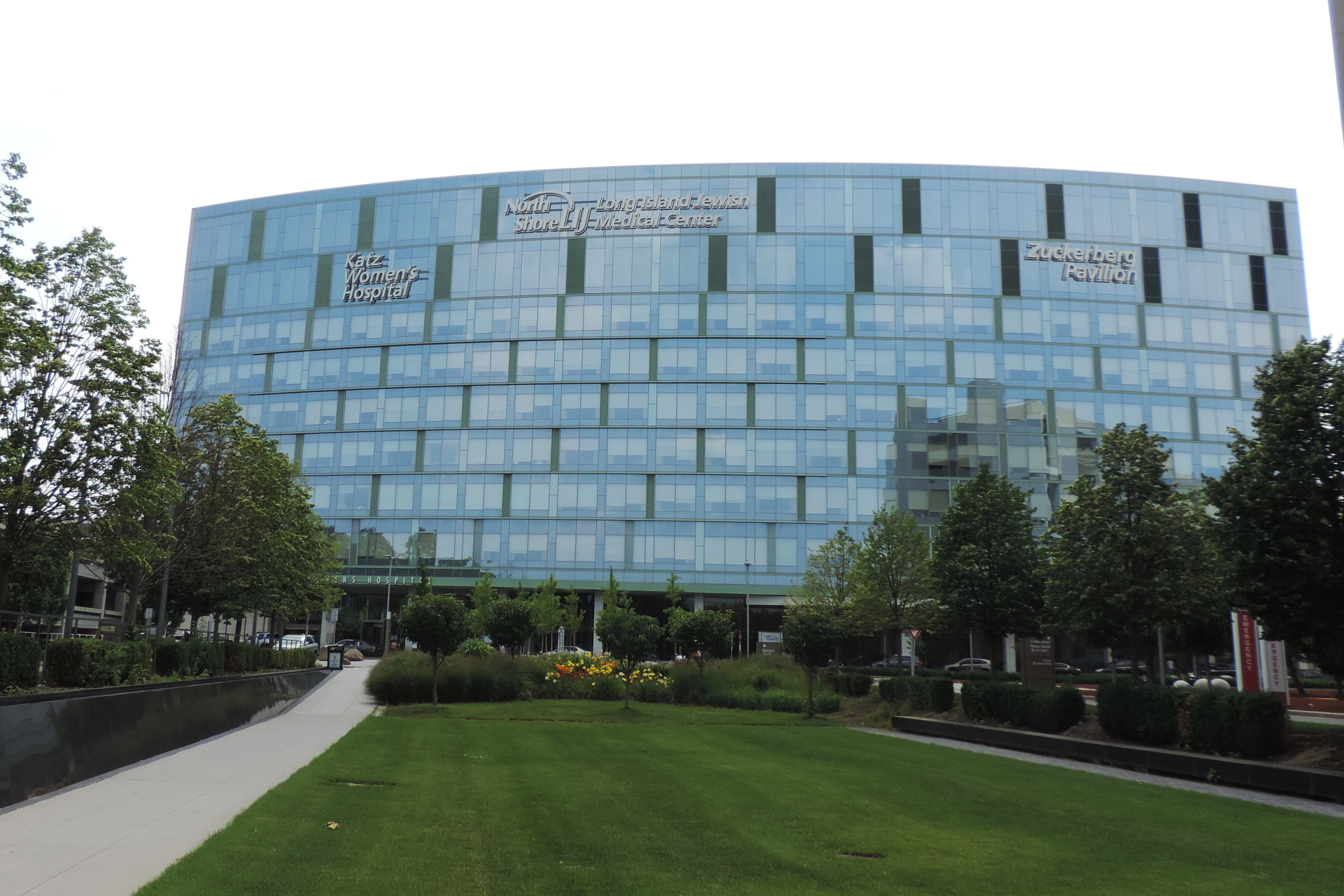
Long Island Jewish Hospital, Zuckerberg Pavilion (2015)

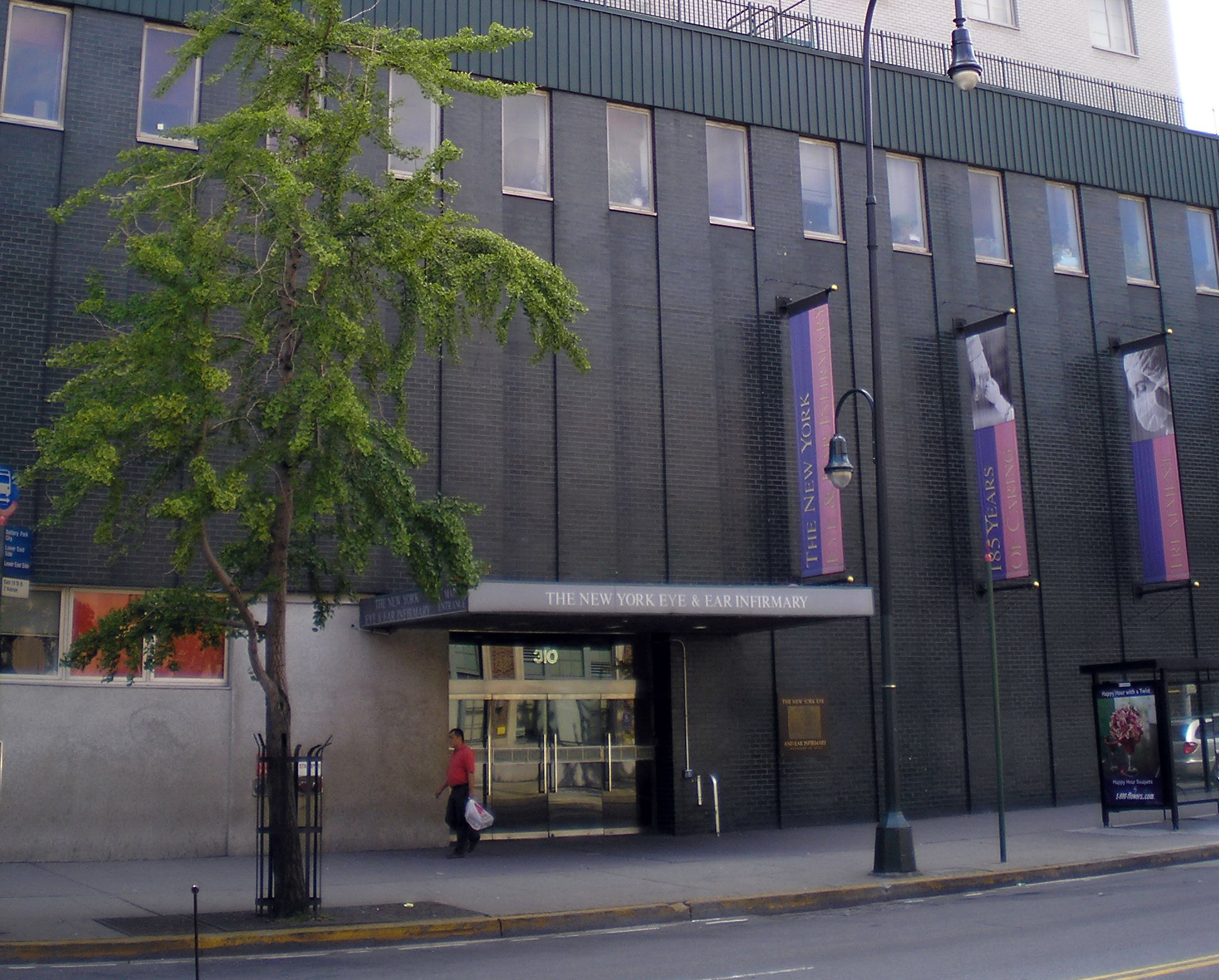
New York Eye and Ear Infirmary (2006)

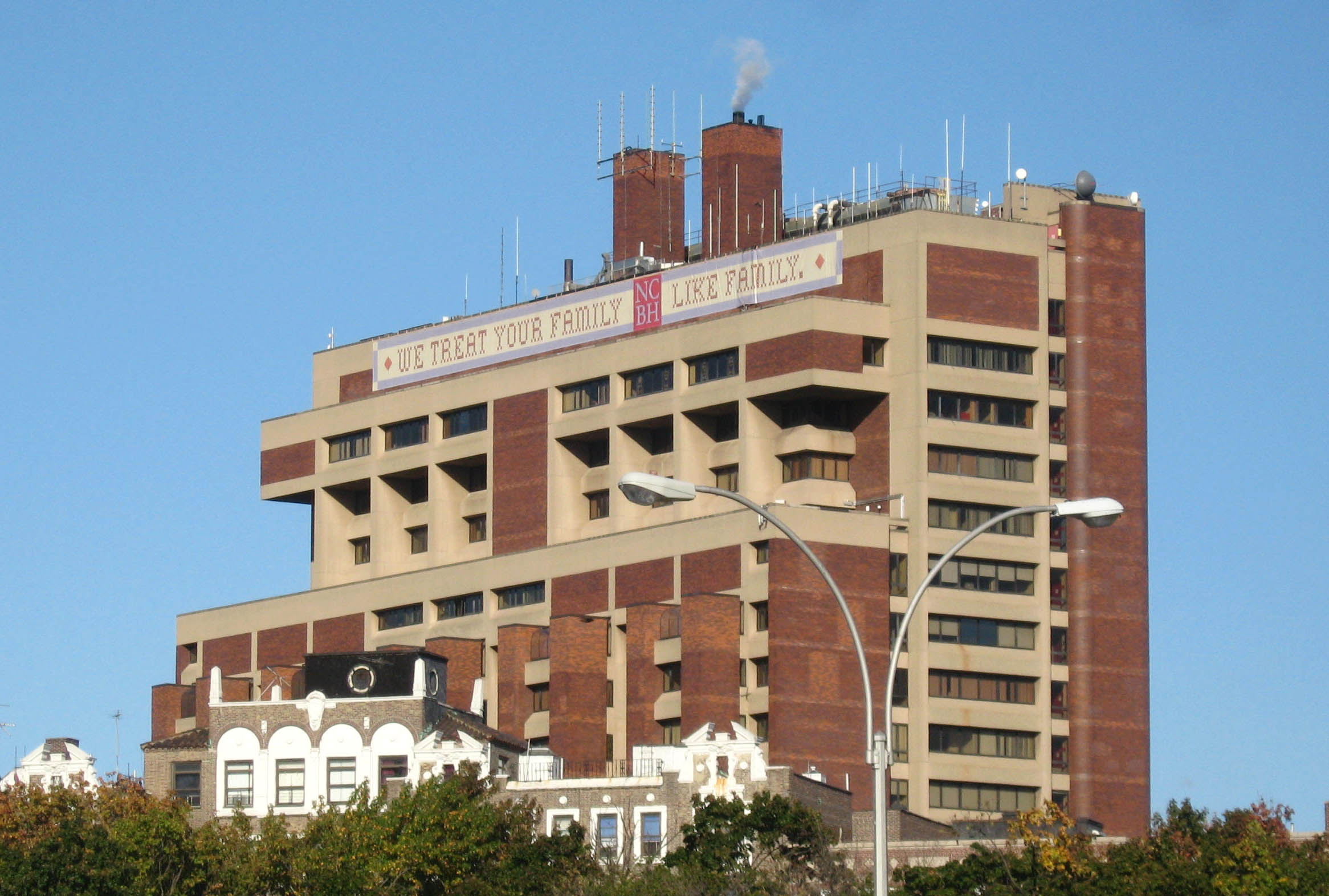
North Central Bronx Hospital (2008)

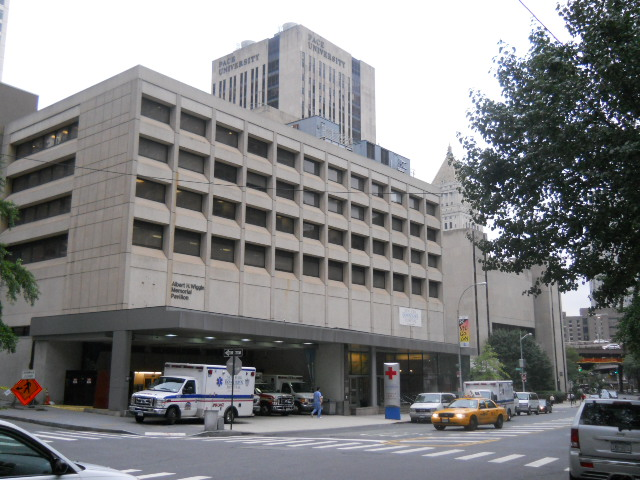
NewYork-Presbyterian Lower Manhattan Hospital (2011)

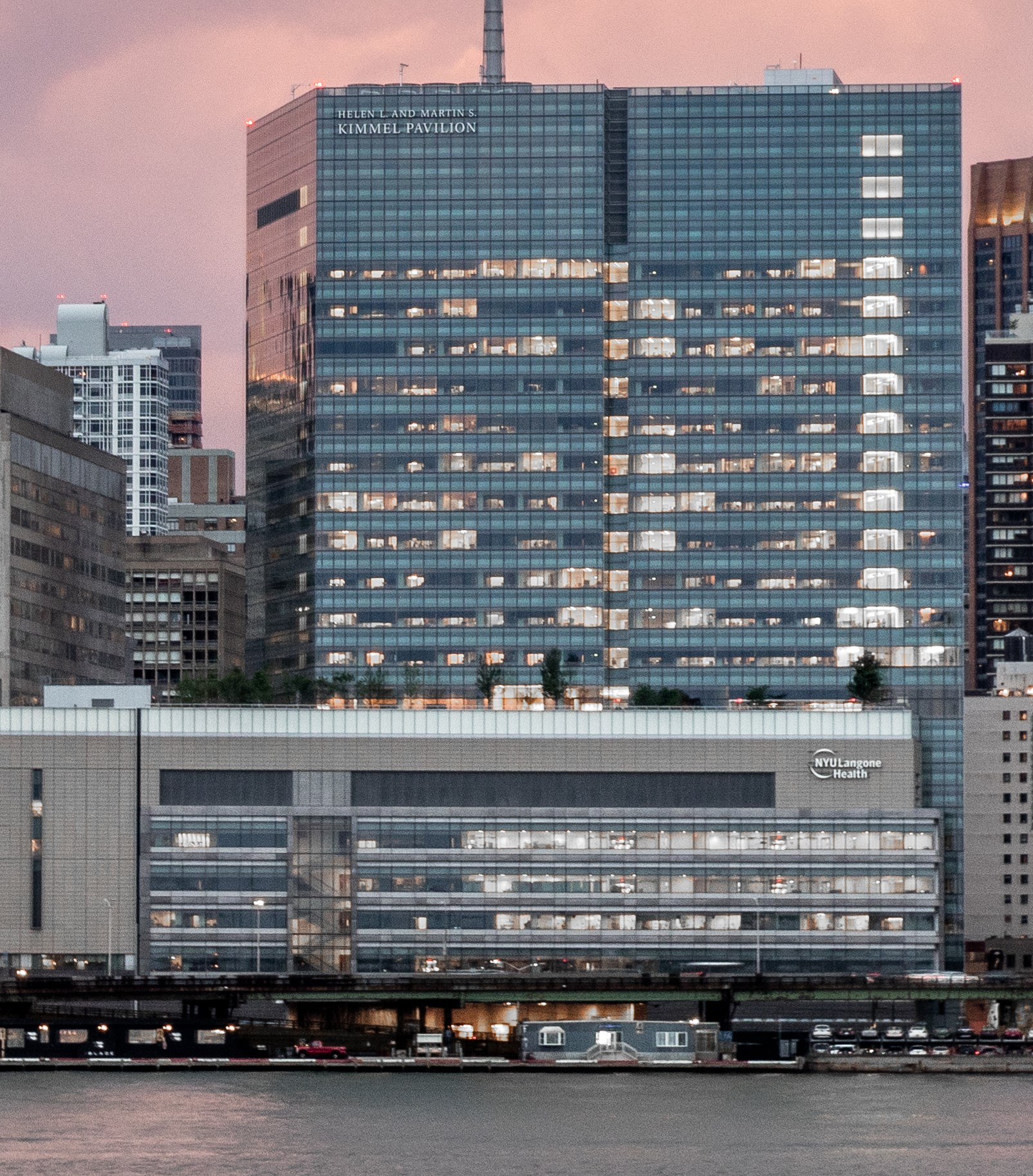
NYU Langone Medical Center, showing Kimmel Pavilion and Hassenfeld Children's Hospital (2018)

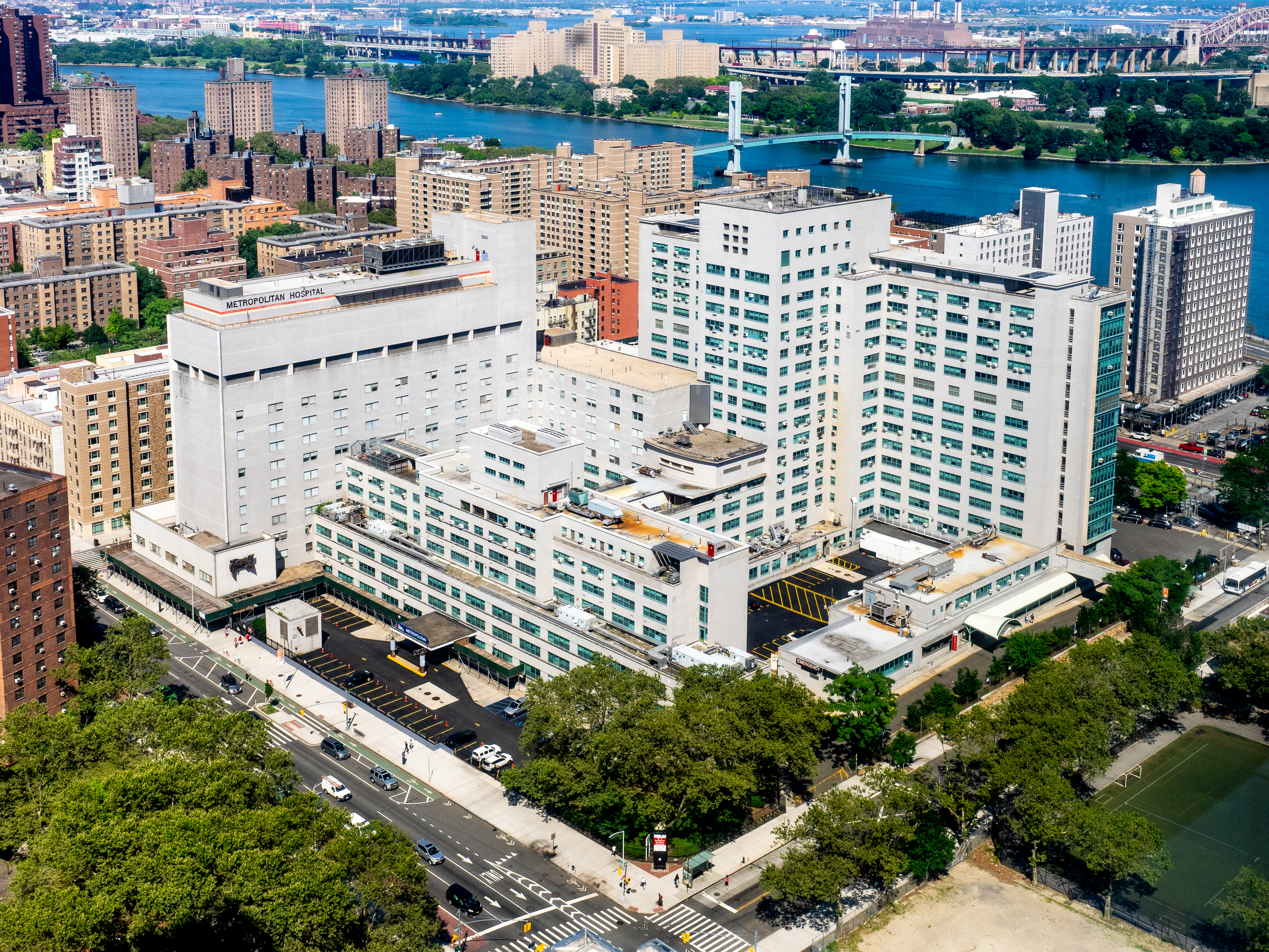
Metropolitan Hospital Center (2019)

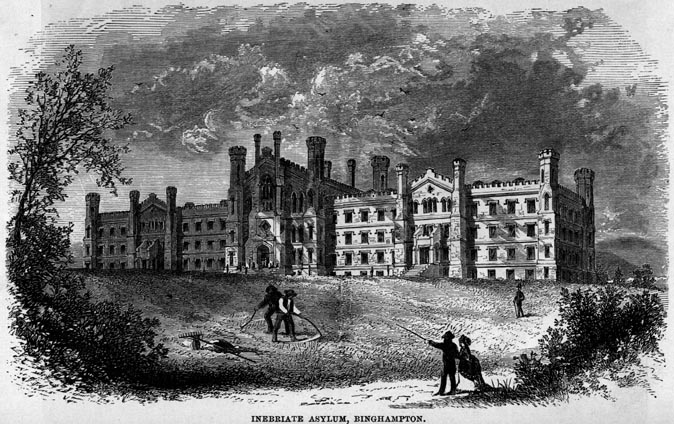
New York State Inebriate Asylum (1882)

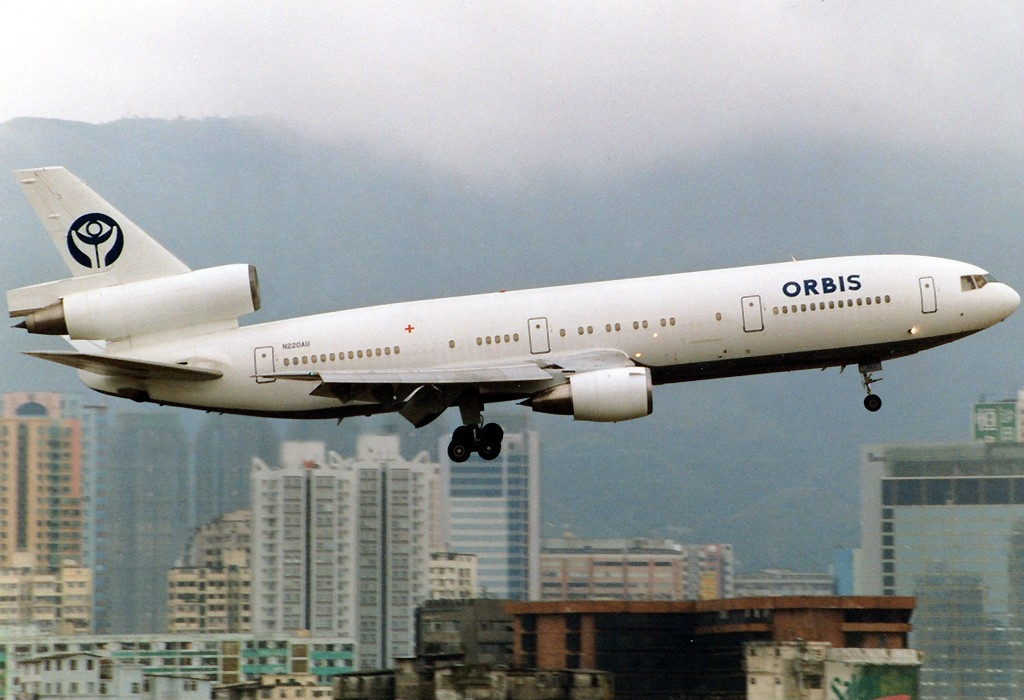
Orbis Flying Eye Hospital flying out of Hong Kong (1997)

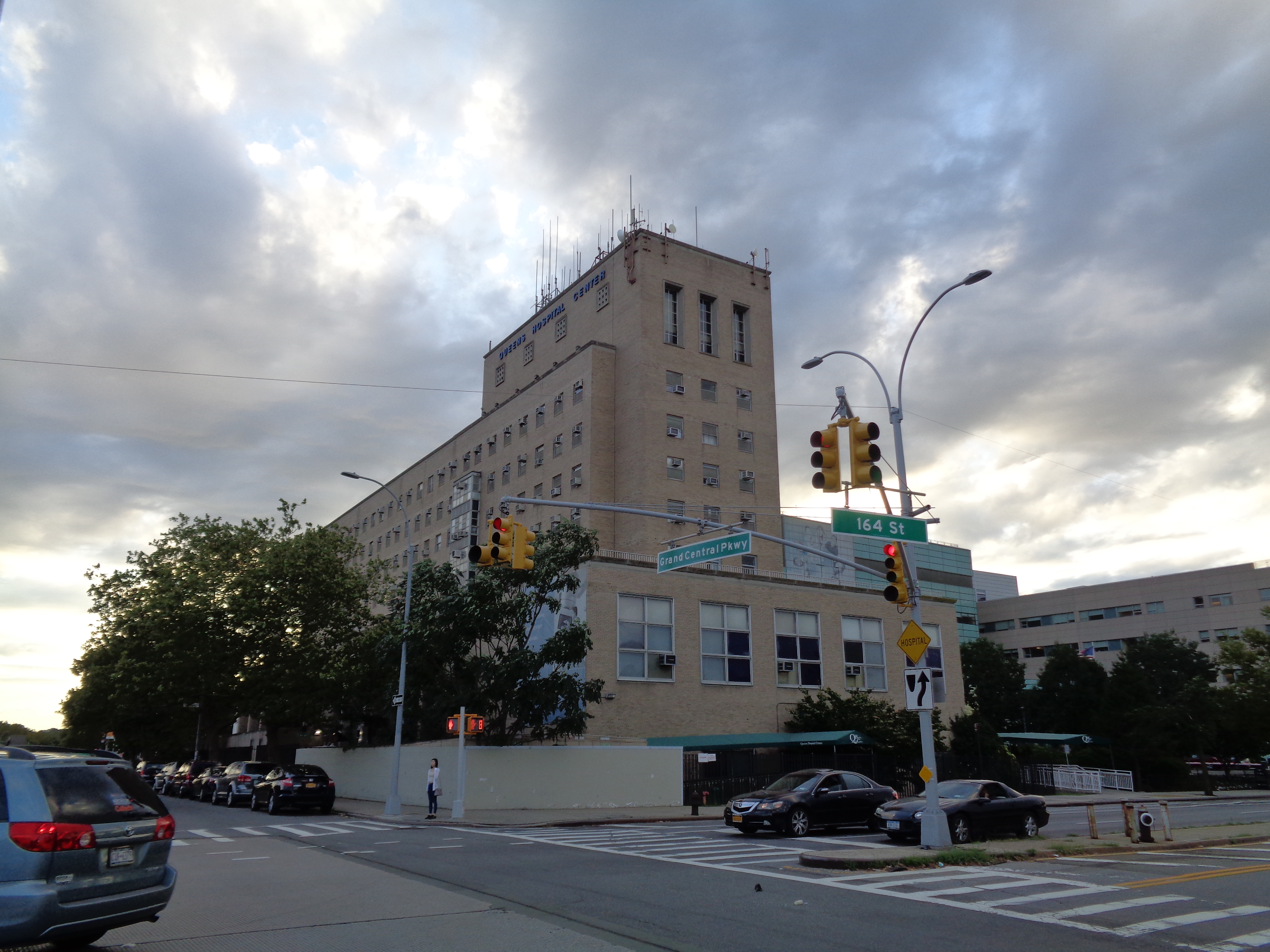
Queens Hospital Center (2017)

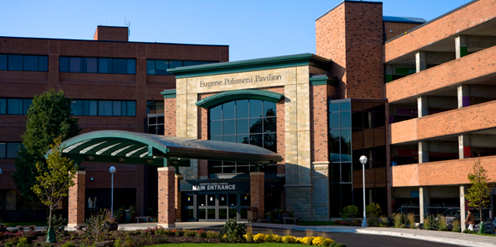
Rochester General Hospital, Rochester (2016)

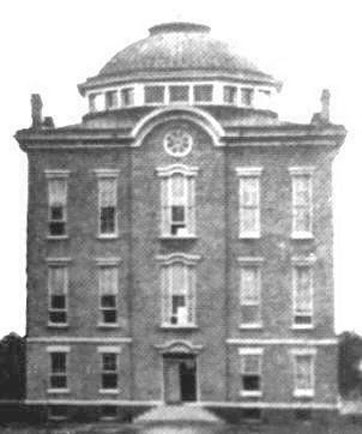
Rochester City Hospital in Rochester, predecessor of the Rochester General Hospital (1864)

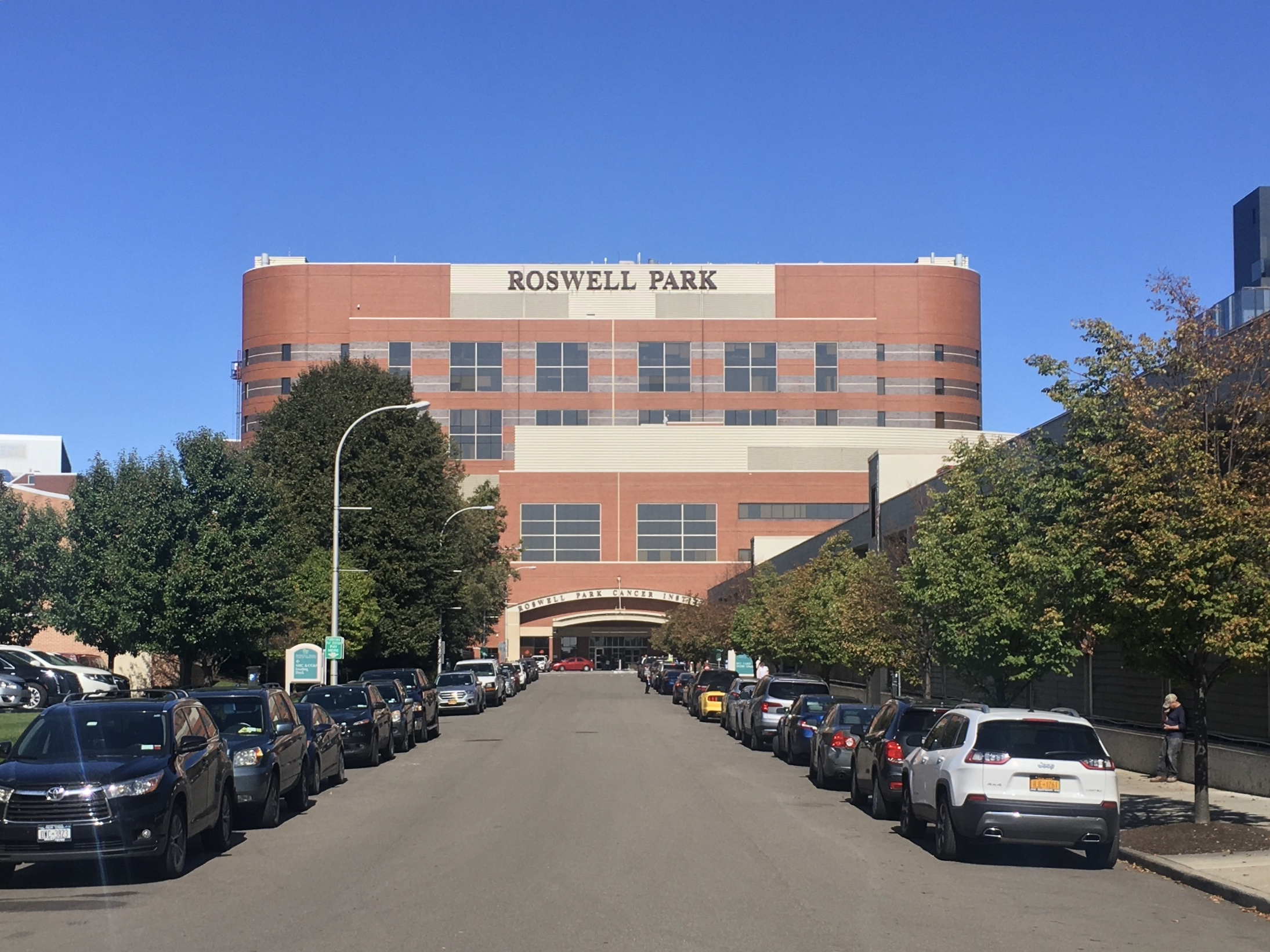
Roswell Park Comprehensive Cancer Center (2019)

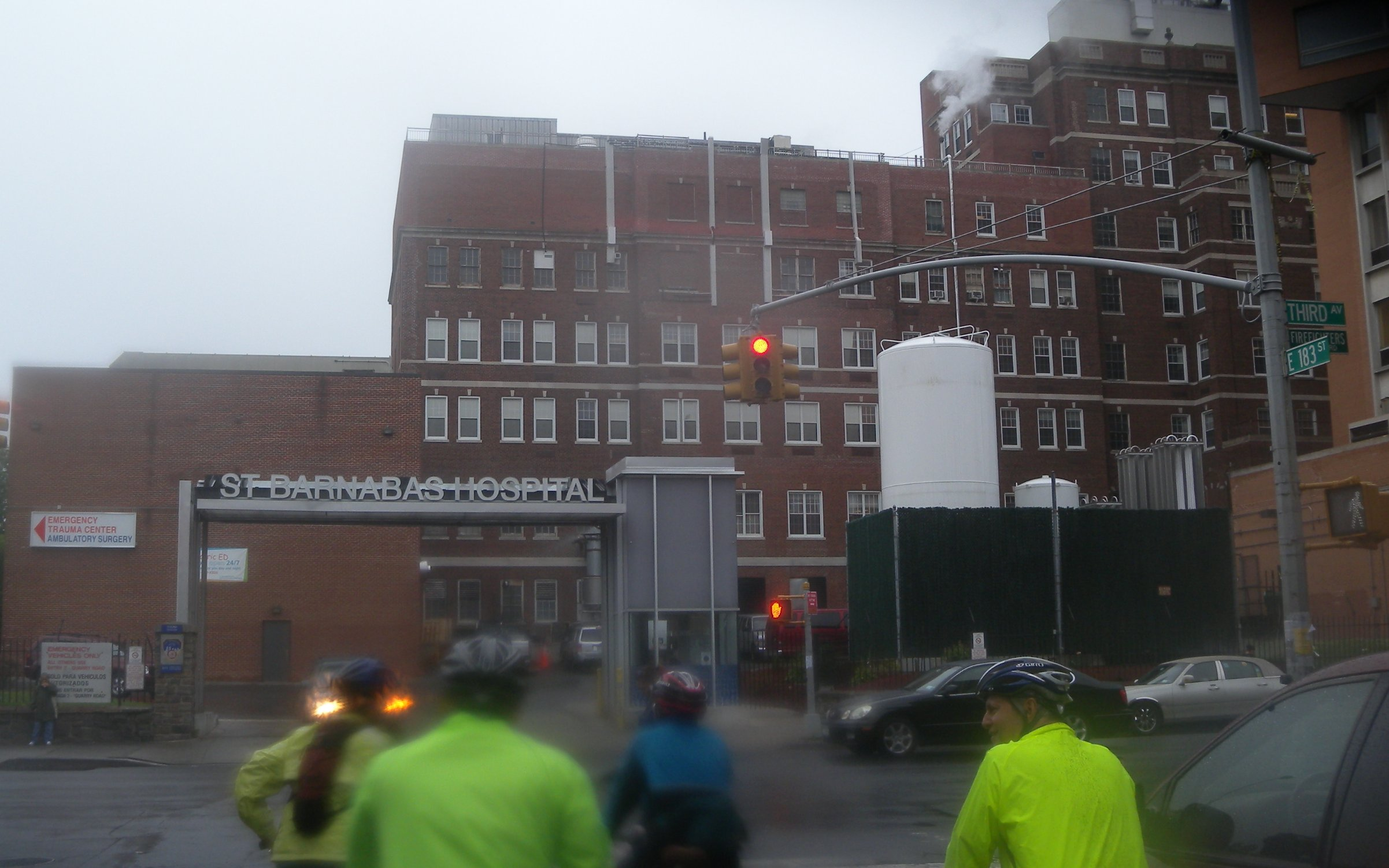
St. Barnabas Hospital, The Bronx (2012)

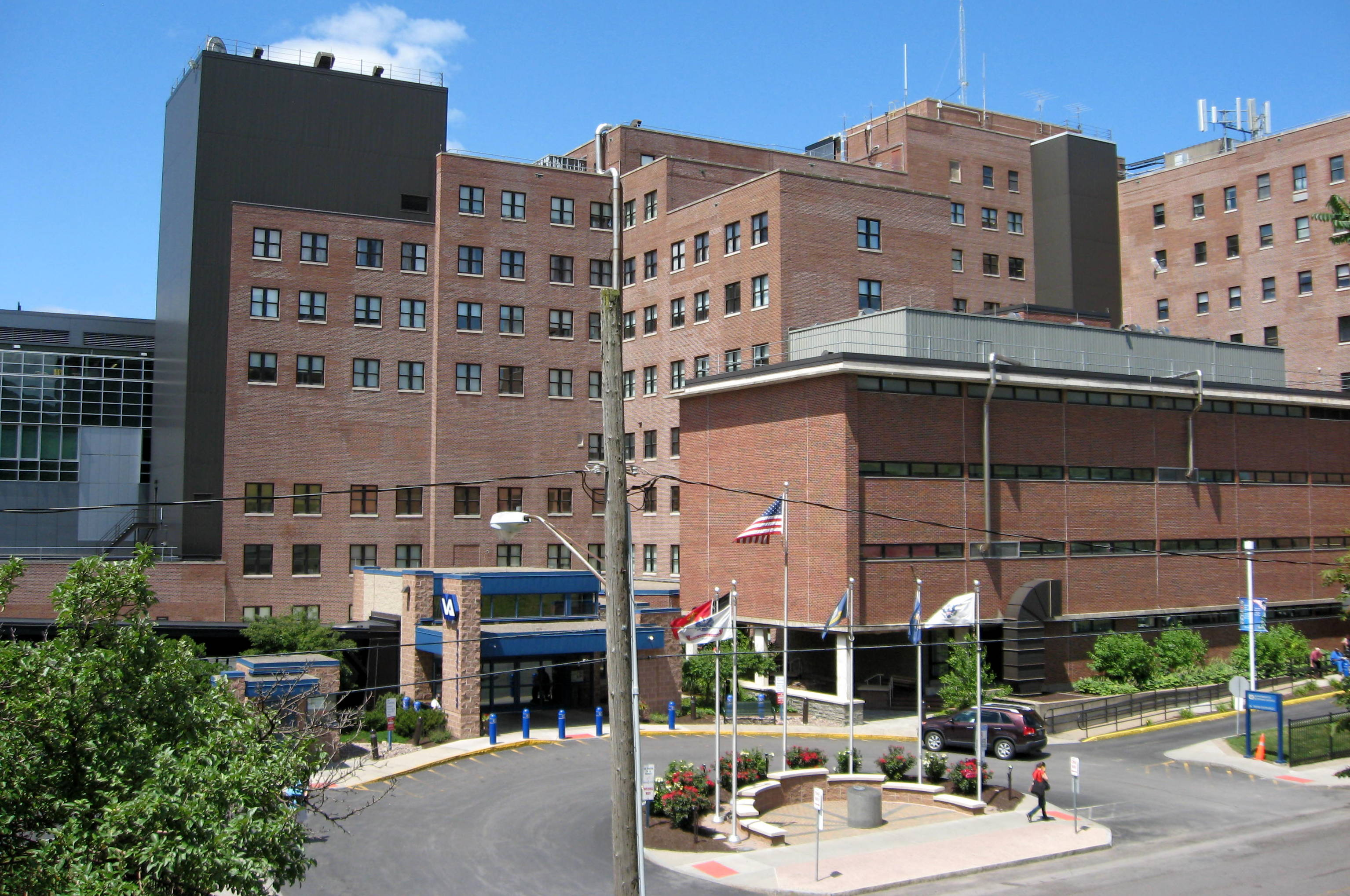
Syracuse VA Medical Center (2014)

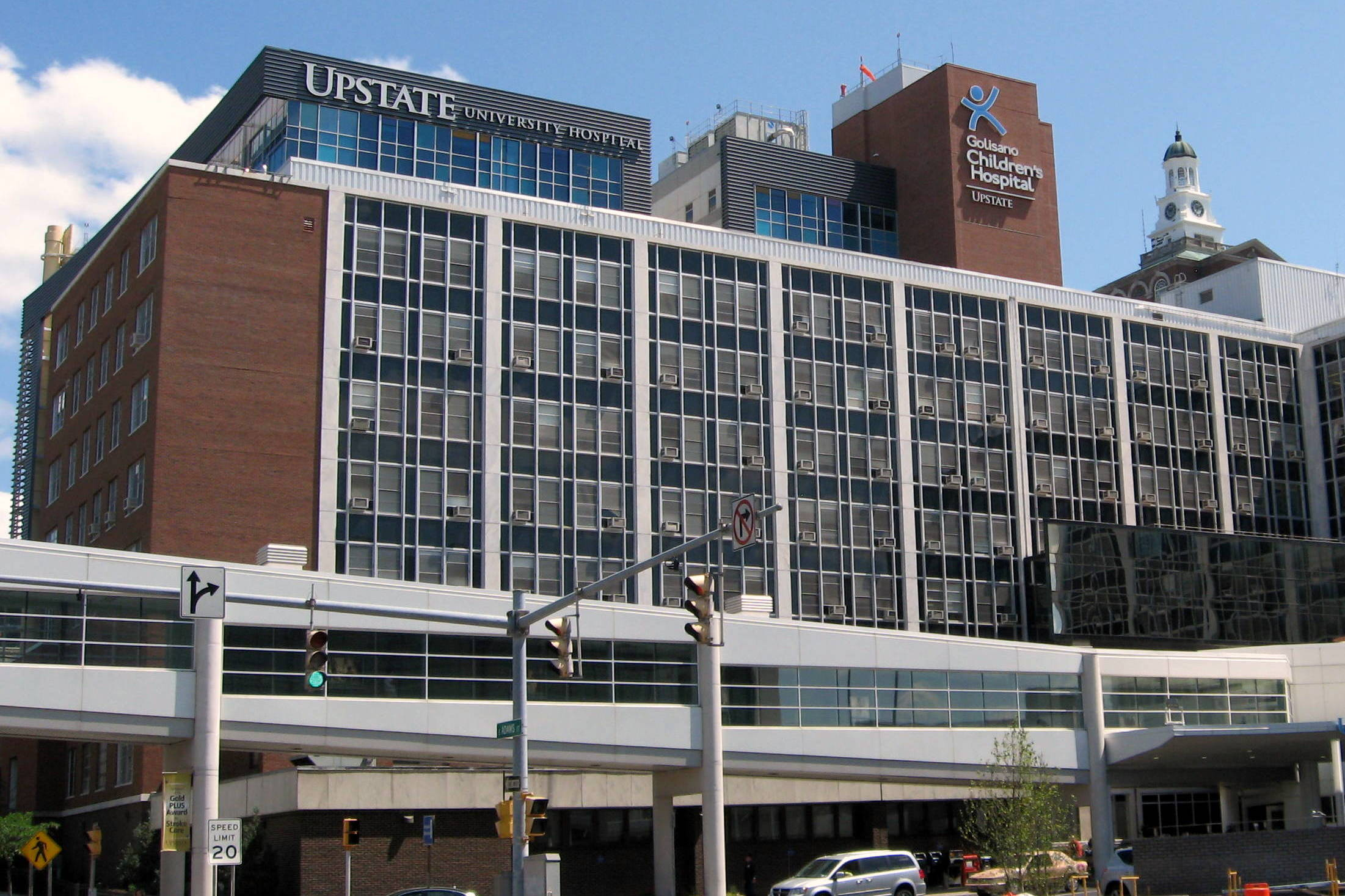
Upstate University Hospital in Syracuse (2014)

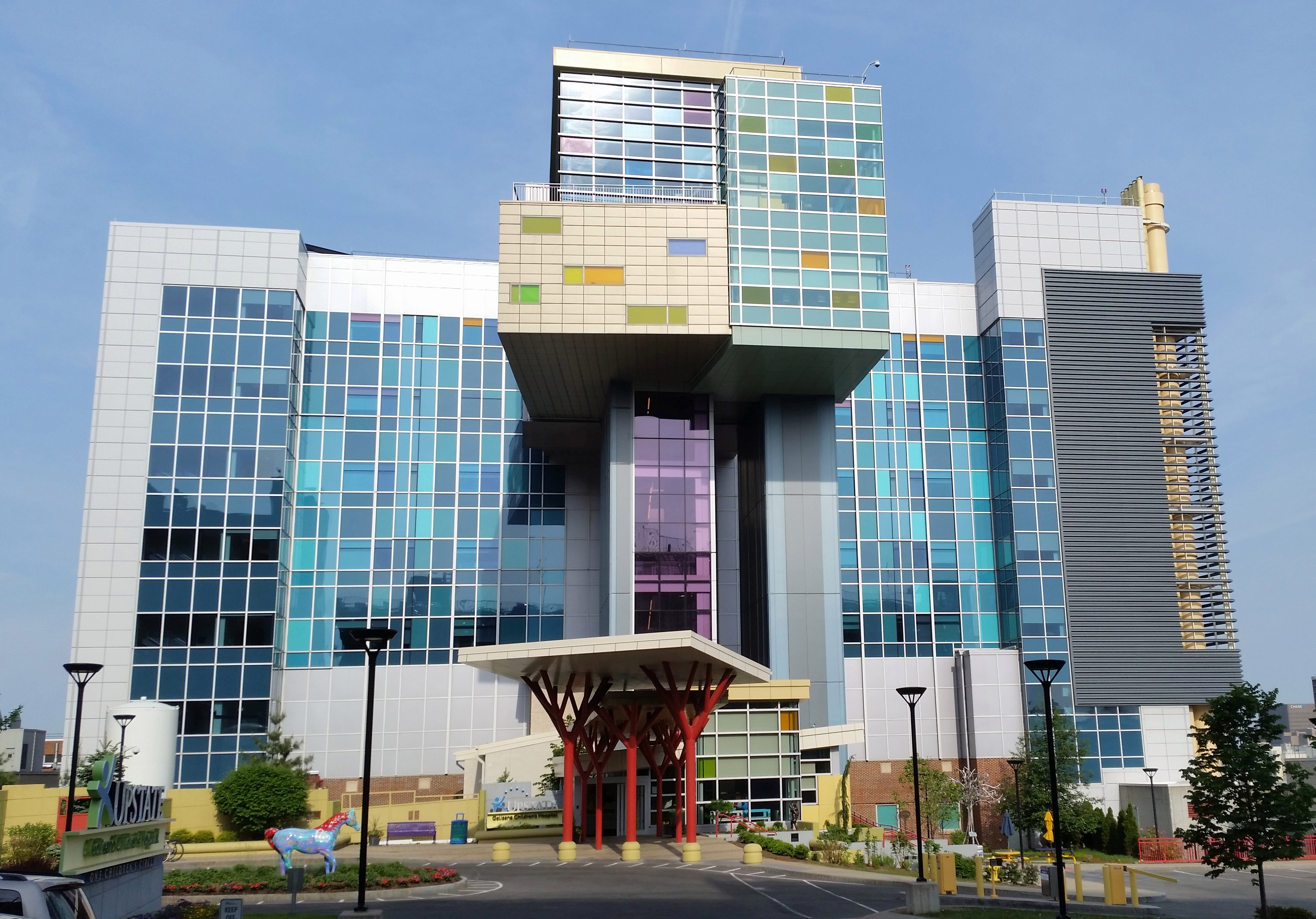
Upstate Children's Hospital (2016)

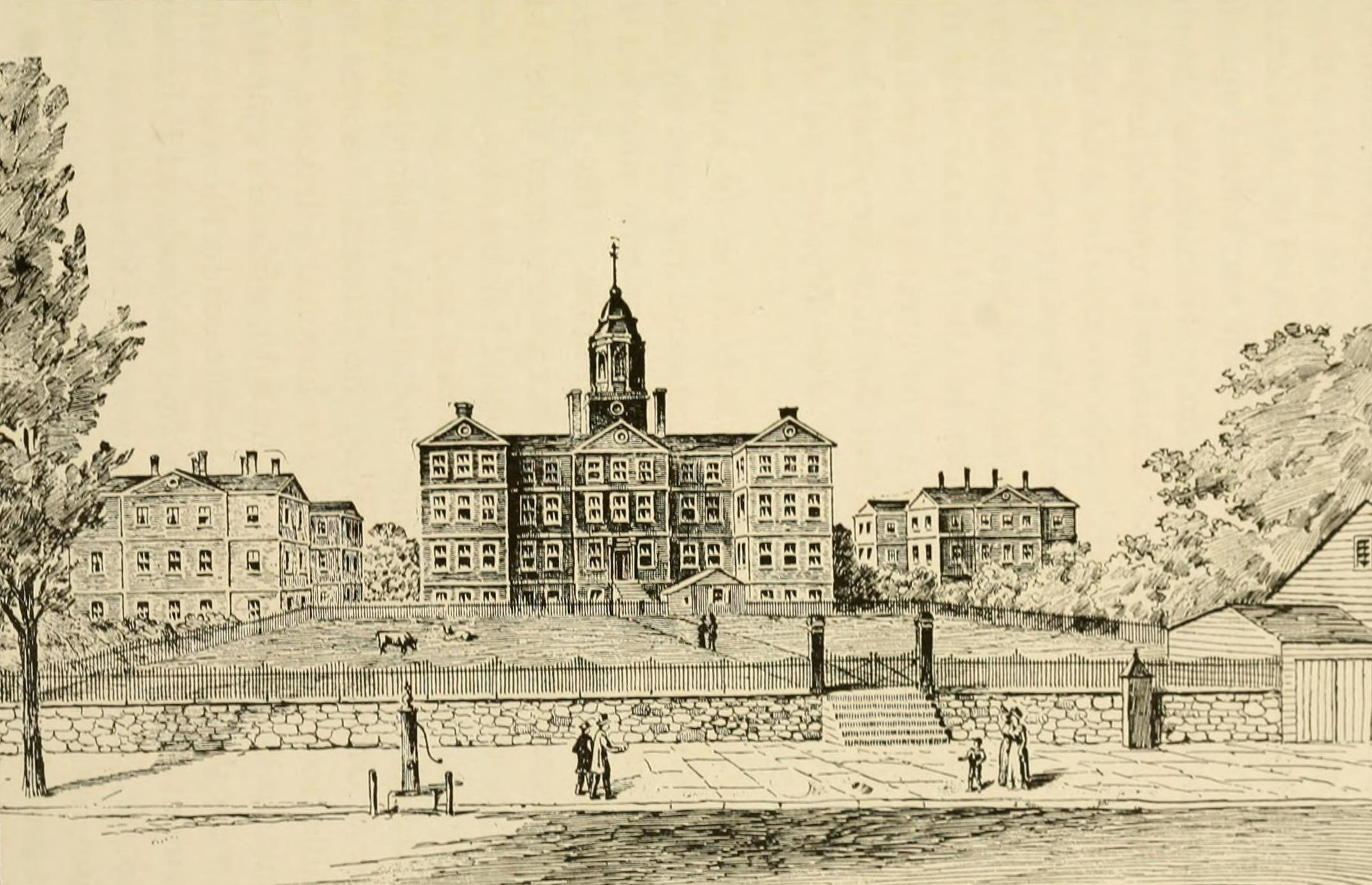
Weill Cornell Medical Center (1911)
