= A.O. Fox Memorial Hospital =

New York (state) hospital system

- Bassett Healthcare Network

Geography
- Location: 1 Norton Avenue, Oneonta, Otsego County, New York, United States
- Coordinates: 42°27′29″N 75°3′8″W

Organization
- Type: General

Services
- Beds: 197, 67

History
- Construction started: 5 October 1900

Links
- Website: www.bassett.org/locations/ao-fox-hospital
- Lists: Hospitals in New York State

A.O. Fox Memorial Hospital is a not-for-profit medical facility located in Oneonta, New York, United States. Fox "is a general medical and surgical facility" that also is a teaching hospital. They operate a "satellite emergency department" in nearby Sidney, New York.

== History ==
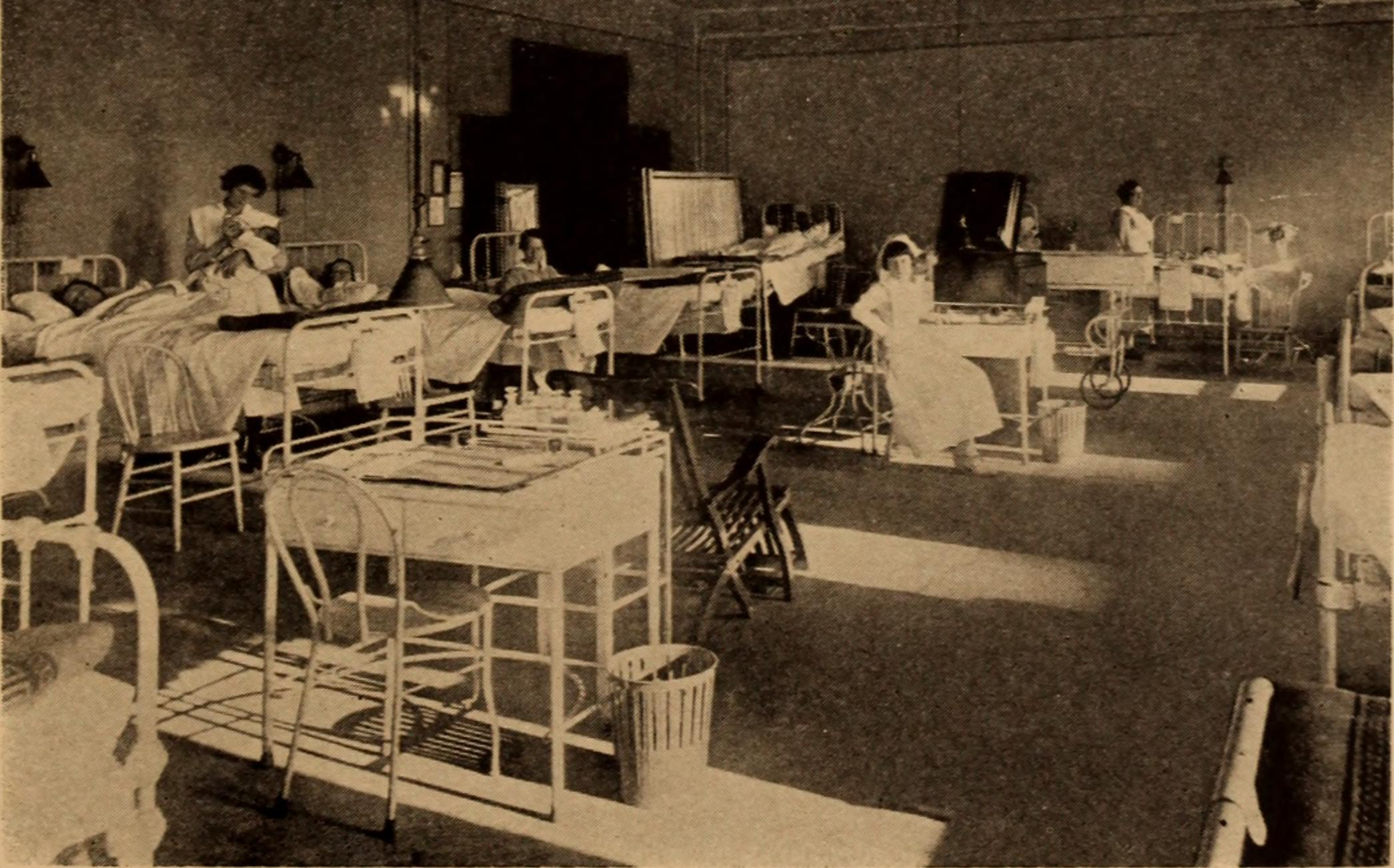
New York Nursery and Child's Hospital Annual Report (1910) includes Aurelia Osborn Fox (A.O. Fox) Memorial Hospital Oneonta, New York

Aurelia Osborn Fox was born in Oneonta. She and her husband Reuben lived there. When she died in 1899, he contributed $10,000 to help found and fund the hospital named in her memory.

Fox Memorial was described in 1994 as a "burgeoning network of outpatient feeder clinics" fighting for "survival in an era of declining hospital use and shuttered hospitals." The hospital, which has a nursing home unit, had discussed affiliating with nearby "Mary I. Imogene Bassett Hospital in Cooperstown" in 1994, and then in 2008. In 2010 "a corporate affiliation" was initiated. In 2017 an affiliation with Tri-Town Regional Hospital in Sidney, 23 miles from Fox, was initiated. The latter is named A.O. Fox Memorial Hospital - Tri-Town Campus, Sidney.
