= Maisie Peters discography =

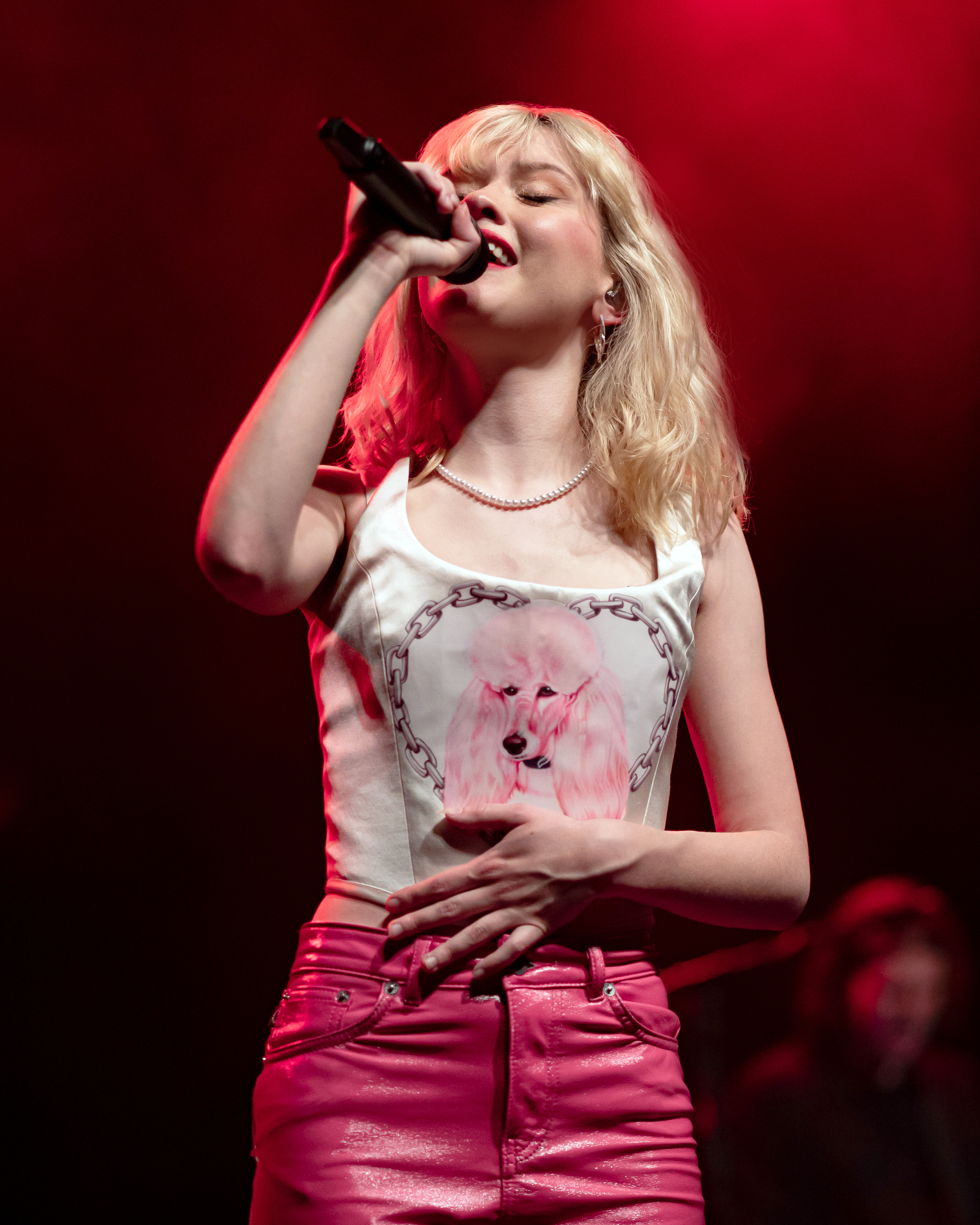
- Peters performing in 2022
- Studio albums: 3
- EPs: 2
- Soundtrack albums: 1
- Singles: 30
- Promotional singles: 6
- Music videos: 20

The discography of the English singer-songwriter Maisie Peters consists of three studio albums, one soundtrack album, two extended plays (EPs), thirty singles (including five as a featured artist), six promotional singles and twenty music videos (including two as a featured artist). Peters independently released her first single, "Place We Were Made", in 2017, followed up by her second single, "Birthday". The songs gained attention in indie-pop circles, after which she signed with Atlantic Records UK. With Atlantic, she released two extended plays, Dressed Too Nice for a Jacket (2018) and It's Your Bed Babe, It's Your Funeral (2019). In 2020, Peters contributed the song "Smile" to the soundtrack album Birds of Prey. She was later contracted to write and sing the soundtrack for the second series of the Apple TV+ original series Trying.

In 2021, Peters became the first artist to be signed to Ed Sheeran's Gingerbread Man Records. She released her debut studio album, You Signed Up for This, later that year. The album entered the UK Albums Chart at number 2 and was the top selling album in UK independent record stores for that week. It also saw Peters achieve her first entries on the UK Singles Chart with "John Hughes Movie" and "Psycho". In 2023, she released her second album, The Good Witch. It debuted atop of the UK Albums Charts, marking Peters' debut number one record. It has since been certified silver by the British Phonographic Industry. The album was supported by the release of singles "Body Better" and "Lost the Breakup".

Peters' third studio album, Florescence, was released in May 2026. It was preceded by various singles, beginning with double A-side singles "You You You" and "Audrey Hepburn". They were followed by "Say My Name in Your Sleep", "My Regards" and "Kingmaker", the latter of which was a collaboration with Julia Michaels.

== Albums ==
=== Studio albums ===
List of studio albums, with selected details and chart positions
Title	Details	Peak chart positions						Certifications
Title	Details	UK	AUS	IRE	NZ	SCO	US	Certifications
You Signed Up for This	Released: 27 August 2021; Label: Gingerbread Man; Formats: CD, LP, cassette, digital download, streaming	2	—	20	—	2	—	
The Good Witch	Released: 23 June 2023; Label: Gingerbread Man; Formats: CD, LP, cassette, digital download, streaming	1	4	7	9	1	—	BPI: Silver
Florescence	Released: 22 May 2026; Label: Gingerbread Man; Formats: CD, LP, cassette, digital download, streaming	1	1	10	9	1	131	

=== Soundtrack albums ===
List of soundtrack albums, with release date and label shown
Title	Details
Trying: Season 2 (Apple TV+ Original Series Soundtrack)	Released: 21 May 2021; Label: Atlantic UK; Formats: Digital download, streaming

== Extended plays ==
List of extended plays, with release date and label shown
Title	EP details
Dressed Too Nice for a Jacket	Released: 2 November 2018; Label: Atlantic UK; Formats: Digital download, streaming
It's Your Bed Babe, It's Your Funeral	Released: 3 October 2019; Label: Atlantic UK; Formats: Digital download, streaming

== Singles ==
=== As lead artist ===
List of singles as lead artist, showing year released, selected chart positions, certifications and originating album
Title	Year	Peak chart positions					Certifications	Album
Title	Year	UK	GER Air.	IRE	JPN	NZ Hot	Certifications	Album
"Place We Were Made"	2017	—	—	—	—	—		Non-album singles
"Birthday"	2017	—	—	—	—	—		Non-album singles
"Worst of You"	2018	—	—	—	—	—		Non-album singles
"Best I'll Ever Sing"	2018	—	—	—	—	—		Non-album singles
"In My Head"	2018	—	—	—	—	—		Dressed Too Nice for a Jacket
"Details"	2018	—	—	—	—	—		Dressed Too Nice for a Jacket
"Stay Young"	2019	—	—	—	—	—		Non-album singles
"Favourite Ex"	2019	—	—	—	—	—		Non-album singles
"This Is on You"	2019	—	—	—	—	—		It's Your Bed Babe, It's Your Funeral
"Adore You"	2019	—	—	—	—	—		It's Your Bed Babe, It's Your Funeral
"Daydreams"	2020	—	—	—	—	—		Non-album singles
"The List"	2020	—	—	—	—	—		Non-album singles
"Sad Girl Summer"	2020	—	—	—	—	—		Non-album singles
"Maybe Don't" (featuring JP Saxe)	2020	—	—	—	—	—		Non-album singles
"John Hughes Movie"	2021	92	—	—	—	40		You Signed Up for This
"Psycho"	2021	57	—	81	87	20	BPI: Silver	You Signed Up for This
"Brooklyn"	2021	—	—	—	—	—		You Signed Up for This
"Cate's Brother"	2022	62	—	29	—	30		Non-album singles
"Blonde"	2022	77	—	83	—	32		Non-album singles
"Good Enough"	2022	—	—	—	—	—		Non-album singles
"Not Another Rockstar"	2022	97	—	93	—	36		Non-album singles
"Body Better"	2023	—	—	—	—	23		The Good Witch
"Lost the Breakup"	2023	85	—	90	— (Note: "Lost the Breakup" did not enter the Billboard Japan Hot 100, but peaked at number 20 on the Hot Overseas chart.)	19		The Good Witch
"Run"	2023	—	—	—	—	23		The Good Witch
"You You You"	2025	—	—	—	—	21		Florescence
"Audrey Hepburn"	2025	—	—	—	—	33		Florescence
"Say My Name in Your Sleep"	2025	—	—	—	— (Note: "Say My Name in Your Sleep" did not enter the Billboard Japan Hot 100, but peaked at number 19 on the Hot Overseas chart.)	—		Florescence
"My Regards"	2026	—	53	—	—	21		Florescence
"Kingmaker" (with Julia Michaels)	2026	—	—	—	—	—		Florescence
"—" denotes releases that did not chart in this region.

=== As featured artist ===
List of singles as featured artist, showing year released and originating album
Title	Year	Album
"One Last Try" (Ren featuring Maisie Peters)	2021	Renbrandt
"Song You'll Never Hear" (Sarcastic Sounds featuring Maisie Peters)	2021	Non-album singles
"Make It Out" (Henry Jamison featuring Maisie Peters)	2022	Non-album singles
"A Good Love, Pt.2" (Bear's Den featuring Maisie Peters)	2022	Trying: Season 3
"America Forever" (Gretta Ray featuring Maisie Peters and Carol Ades)	2023	Positive Spin

=== Promotional singles ===
List of promotional singles, showing year released, selected chart positions and originating album
Title	Year	Peak chart positions			Album
Title	Year	UK	JPN	NZ Hot	Album
"Smile"	2020	—	—	—	Birds of Prey: The Album
"Funeral" (featuring James Bay)	2021	—	—	—	Trying: Season 2
"You Signed Up for This"	2021	—	—	—	You Signed Up for This
"Together This Christmas"	2022	47	—	—	Your Christmas or Mine?
"Two Weeks Ago"	2023	—	36	—	The Good Witch
"There It Goes"	2023	—	—	23	The Good Witch

=== Other charted songs ===
List of other charted songs, showing year released, selected chart positions and originating album
Title	Year	Peak chart positions		Album
Title	Year	EST Air.	NZ Hot	Album
"The Good Witch"	2023	—	28	The Good Witch
"Coming of Age"	2023	—	30	The Good Witch
"You're Just a Boy (and I'm Kinda the Man)"	2023	—	35	The Good Witch
"Mary Janes"	2026	—	33	Florescence
"Old Fashioned"	2026	—	26	Florescence
"Houses"	2026	—	35	Florescence
"Questions"	2026	97	20	Florescence
"—" denotes a recording that did not chart or was not released in that territory.

== Songwriting credits ==
List of songwriting credits, with year released and album name
Title	Year	Artist(s)	Album
"Lowkey"	2021	Niki	Non-album single
"Pushing 30"	2022	The Sunshine State	In Another Life
"Even When I Don't"	2023	Emmit Fenn	How to Fly on the Ground
"Millions"	2026	Say Now	TBA
"When I Say I Wanna Break"	2026	Cate	Bottle Blonde
"Cause I Care!"	2026	Cate	Bottle Blonde

== Music videos ==
=== As lead artist ===
List of music videos as lead artist
Title	Year	Director(s)	Ref.
"Birthday"	2017	Dan Massie	
"Stay Young"	2019	Erik Rojas	
"This is on You"	2019	Cottia Thorowgood	
"Adore You"	2019	Luke Bather	
"Sad Girl Summer"	2020	Unknown	
"Maybe Don't" (featuring JP Saxe)	2020	Alex Nicholson	
"John Hughes Movie"	2021	Louis Bhose	
"Psycho"	2021	Louis Bhose	
"Brooklyn"	2021	Unknown	
"Good Enough"	2022	Nic Minns	
"Not Another Rockstar"	2022	Avesta Keshtmand	
"Body Better"	2023	Mia Barnes	
"Lost the Breakup"	2023	Mia Barnes	
"Run"	2023	Avesta Keshtmand	
"You You You"	2025	James Ogram	
"Audrey Hepburn"	2025	James Ogram	
"My Regards"	2026	Amelia Dimoldenberg	
"Questions"	2026	Georgie Cowan-Turner	

=== As featured artist ===
List of music videos as featured artist
Title	Year	Other artist(s)	Director(s)	Ref.
"Song You'll Never Hear"	2021	Sarcastic Sounds	Jonah Haber	
"Make It Out"	2022	Henry Jamison	Franklin & Marchetta	

== See also ==
- List of songs recorded by Maisie Peters
