= List of songs recorded by Maisie Peters =

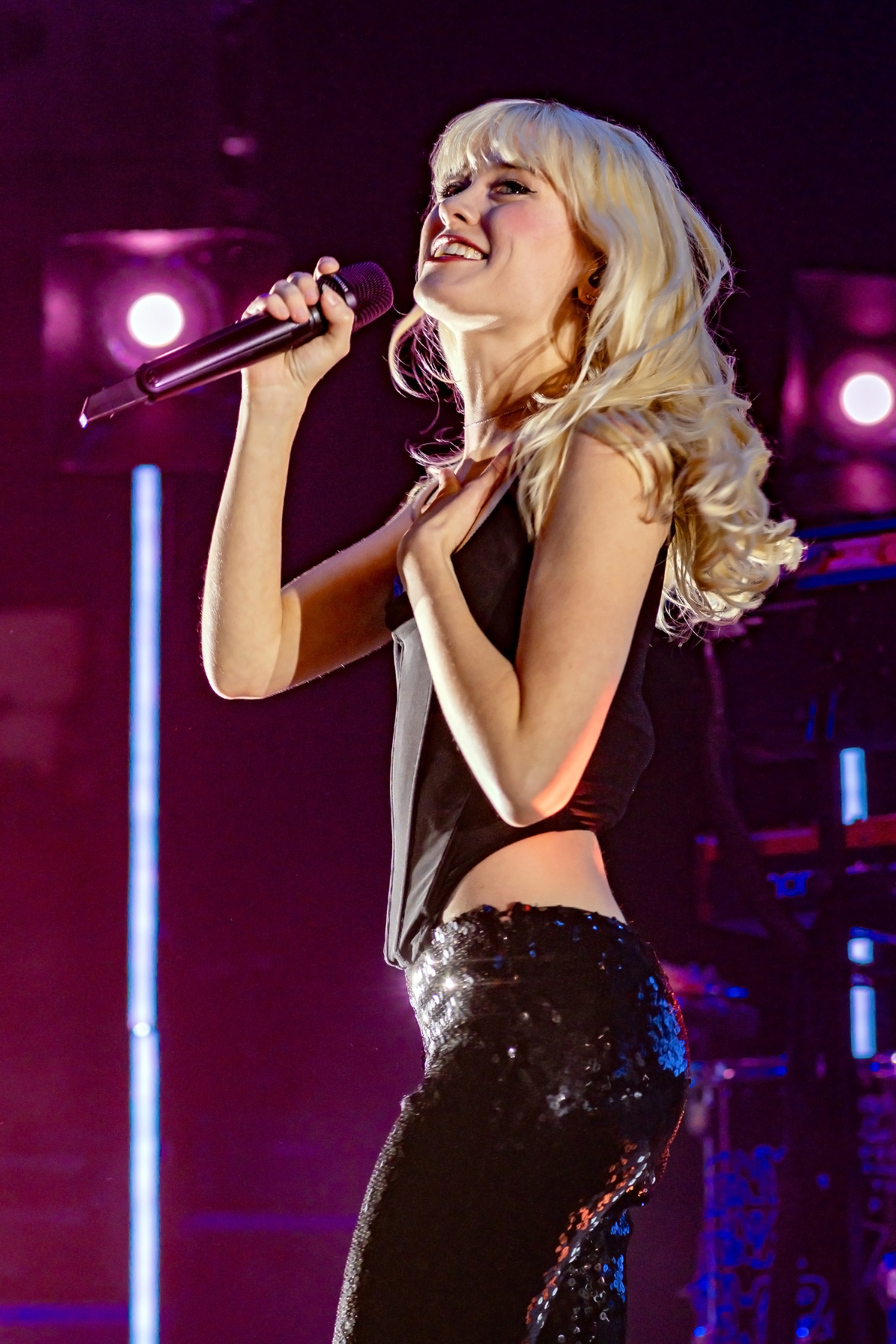
Maisie Peters performing in 2023

English singer-songwriter Maisie Peters has written or co-written every song in her discography, with the exception of several cover versions and guest features. Her professional music career began in 2015, when she began posting original songs to YouTube, having previously busked in her hometown. Peters independently released her debut single, "Place We Were Made", in 2017, after which she got signed to Atlantic Records. With Atlantic, she released two extended plays, Dressed Too Nice for a Jacket (2018) and It's Your Bed Babe, It's Your Funeral (2019). After releasing further singles with Atlantic, Peters was contracted to write and record a soundtrack for the Apple TV+ series Trying, released in 2021.

In 2021, Peters became the first artist to be signed to Gingerbread Man Records, founded by Ed Sheeran. She released her debut studio album, You Signed Up for This, which included the single "Psycho". She went on to have another string of single releases in 2022, including "Cate's Brother", "Blonde" and "Not Another Rockstar". In 2023, Peters released "Body Better" and "Lost the Breakup" as the first two singles from her second studio album, The Good Witch. After various other singles from the album, a deluxe edition with six further songs was released later that year. Peters released her third studio album, Florescence, in 2026. It was preceded by the release of five singles and included collaborations with Julia Michaels and Marcus Mumford.

== Songs ==
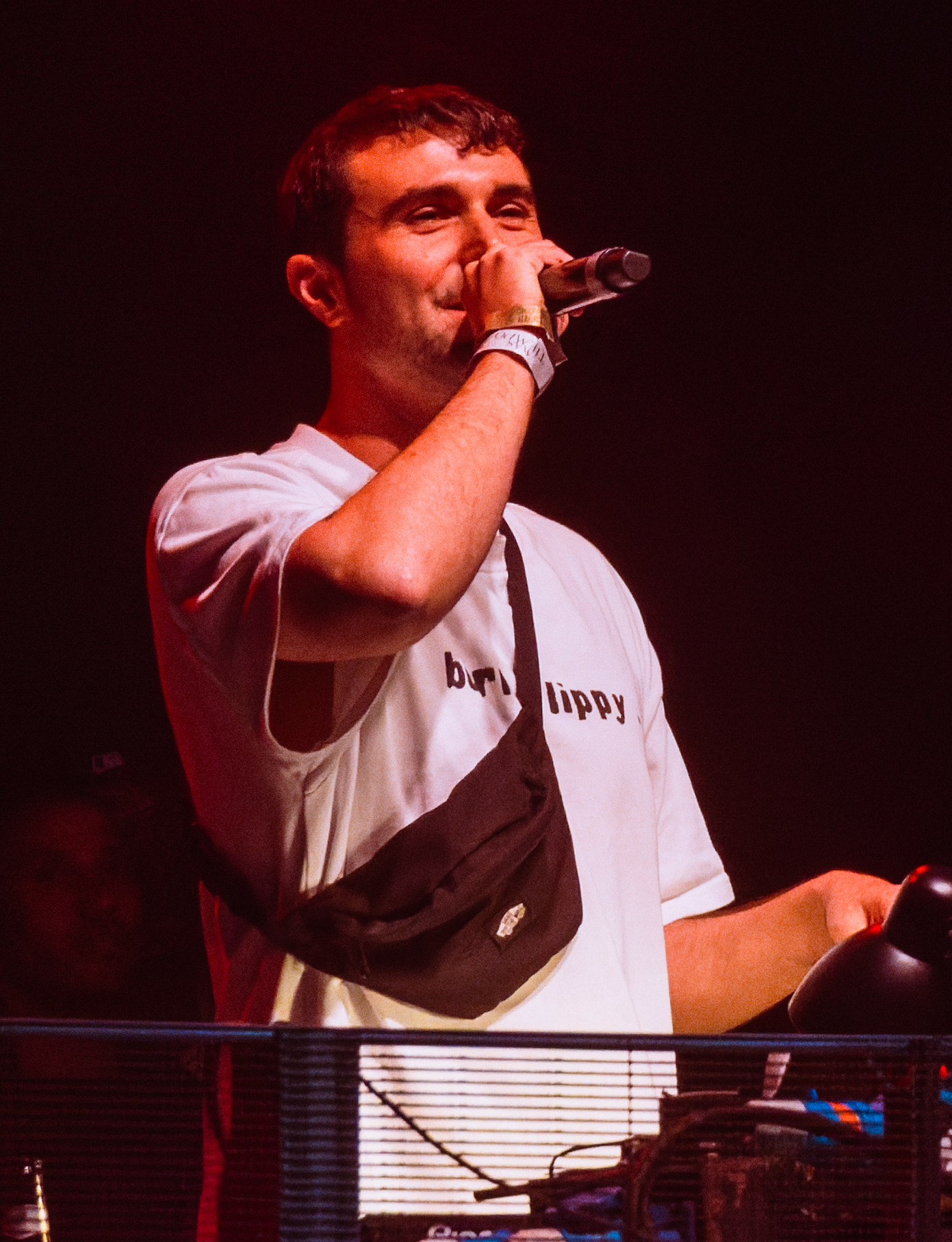
Peters co-wrote alongside Fred Again for various songs.

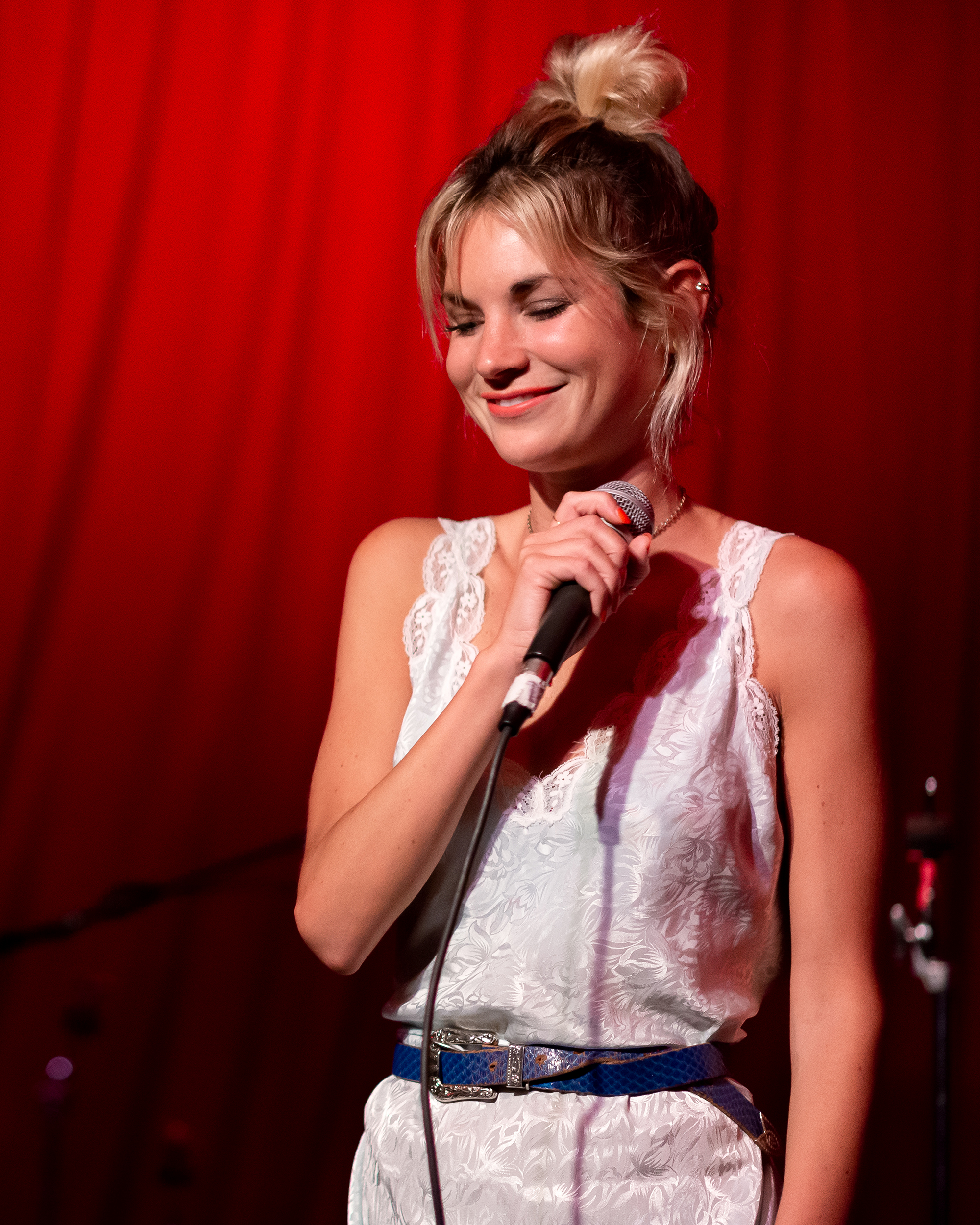
Amy Allen co-wrote "April Showers" with Peters.

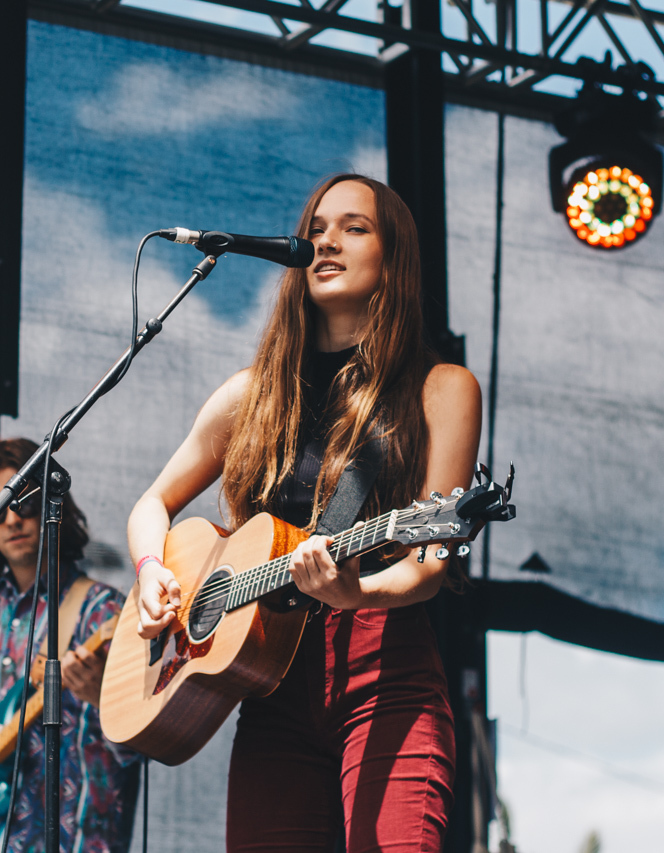
Peters and Gretta Ray have provided backing vocals for each other numerous times.

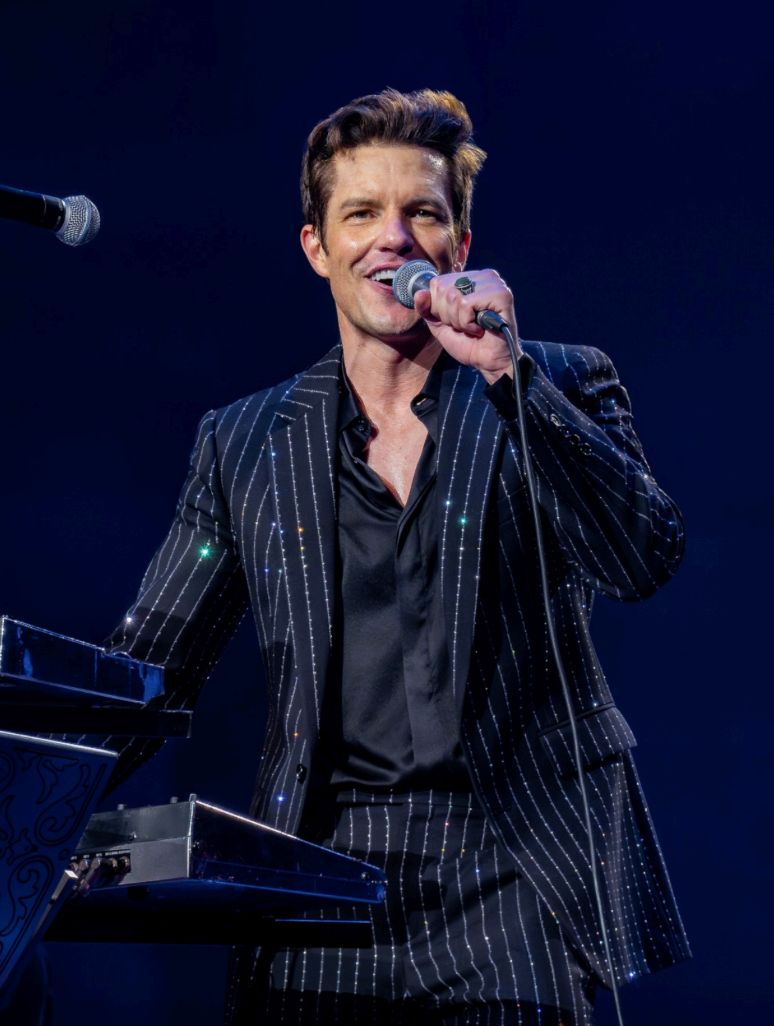
Peters covered "Between Me & You" by Brandon Flowers for Apple Music.

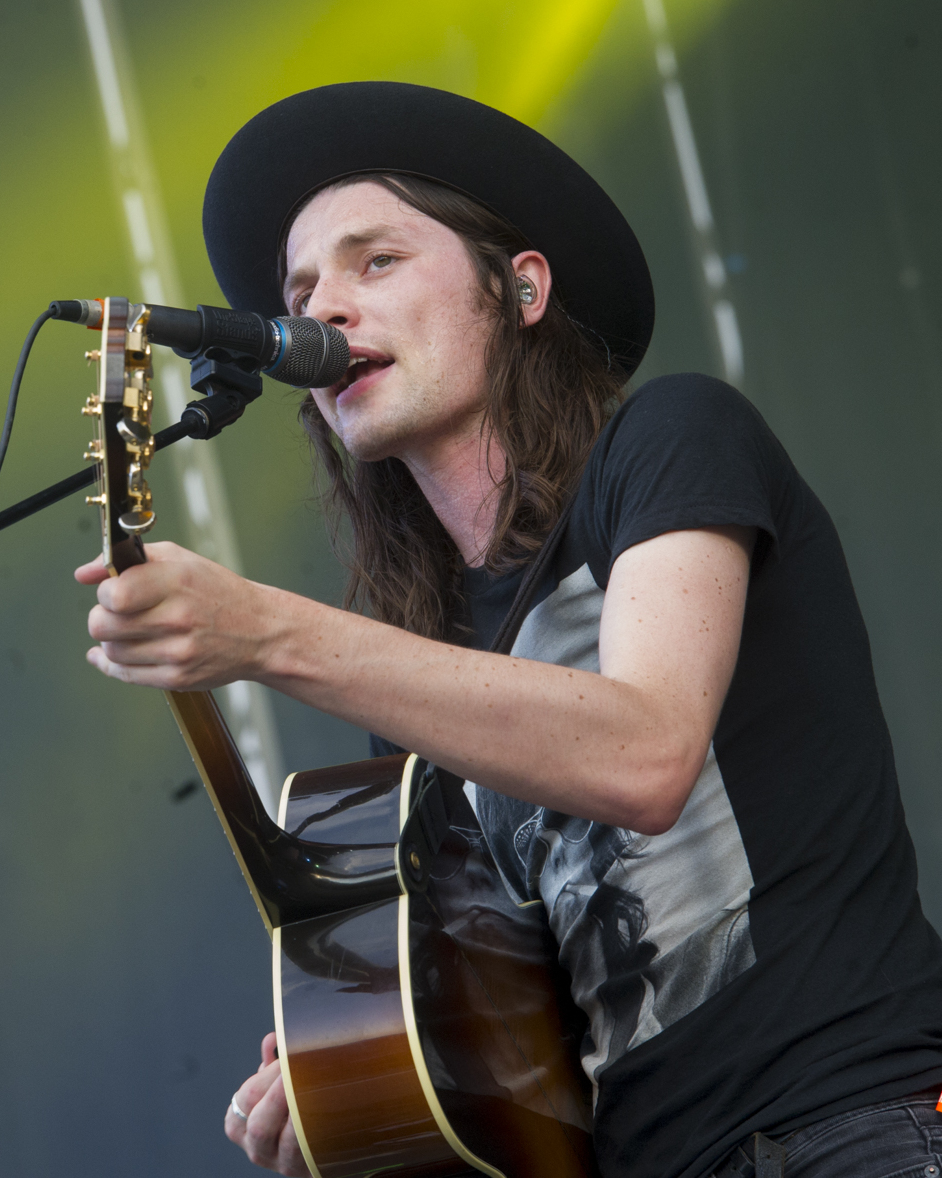
James Bay featured on "Funeral" with Peters.

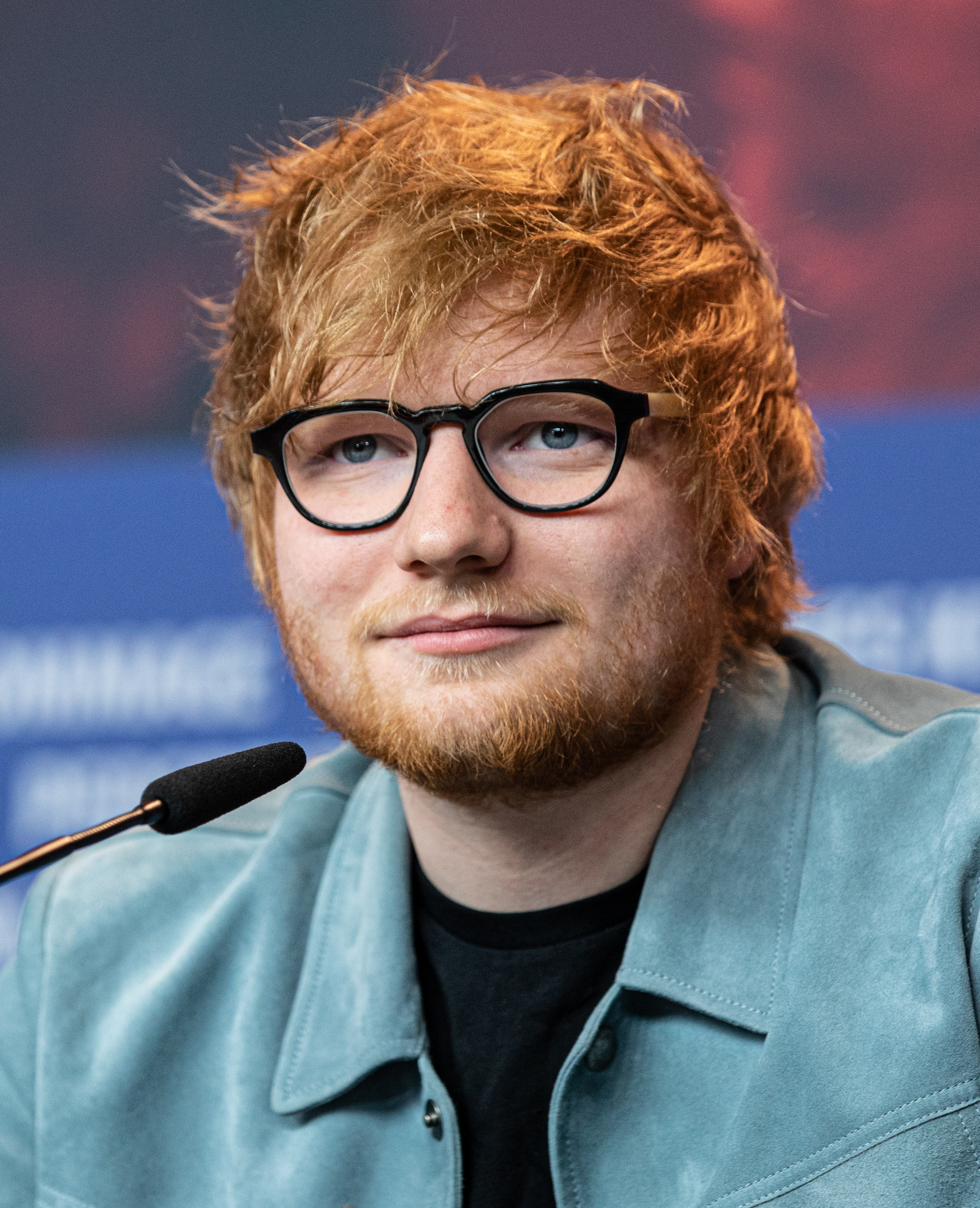
Ed Sheeran, Peters' label boss, has co-writing credits on three of her songs.

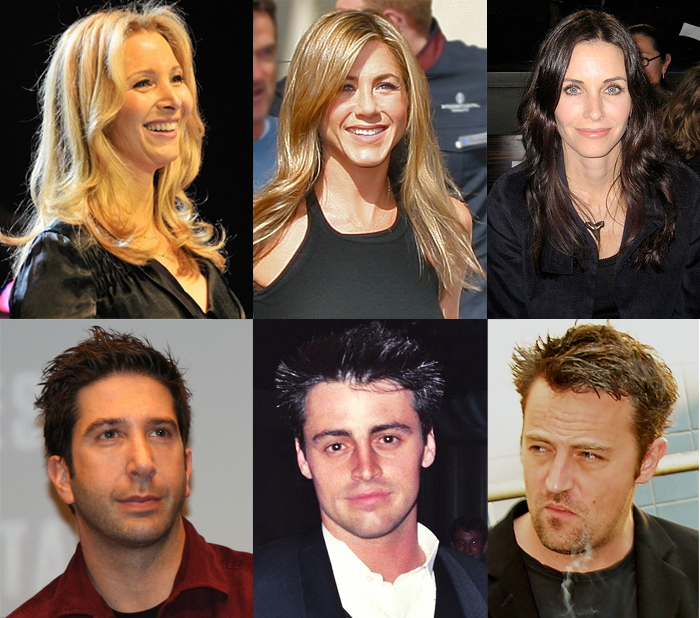
Peters covered "I'll Be There for You" by the Rembrandts in 2018 for Spotify; the song is known as the main theme song for Friends.

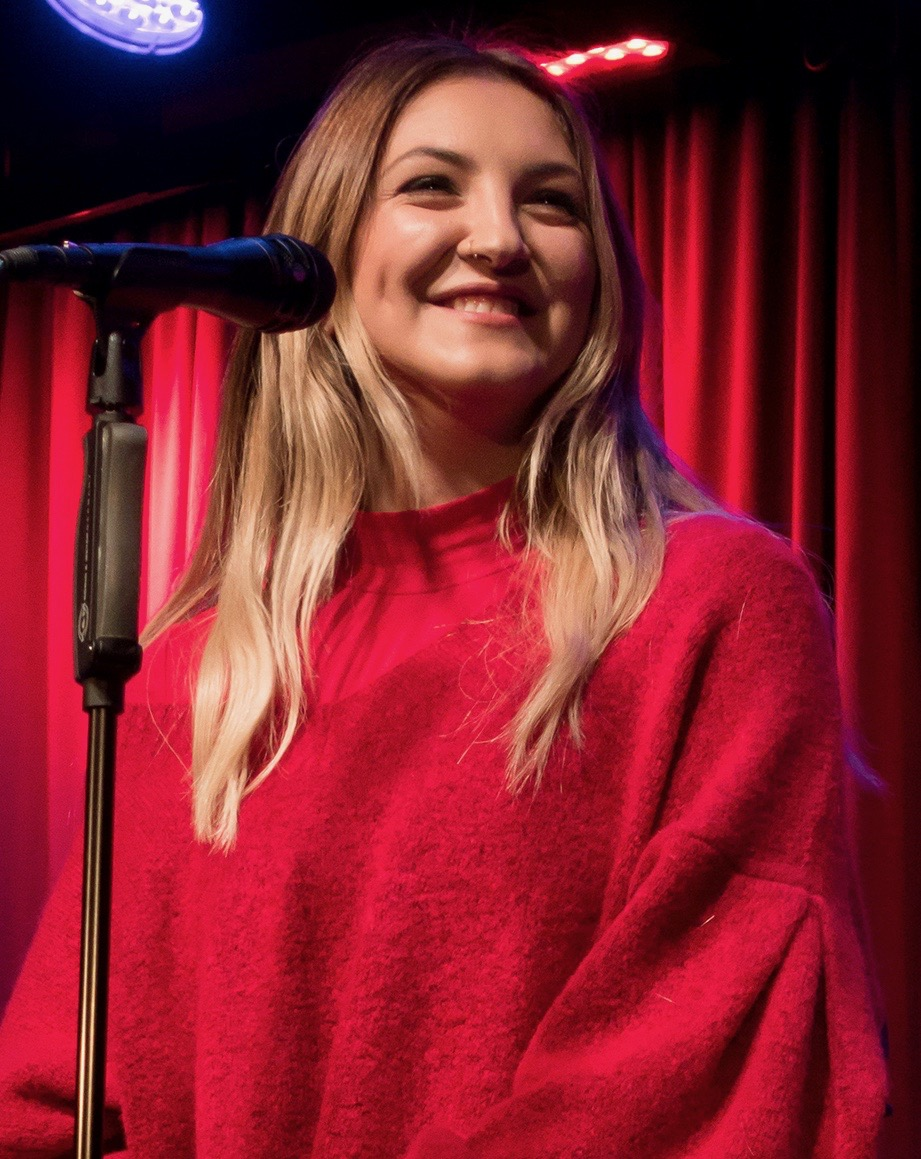
Peters collaborates with Julia Michaels for "Kingmaker".

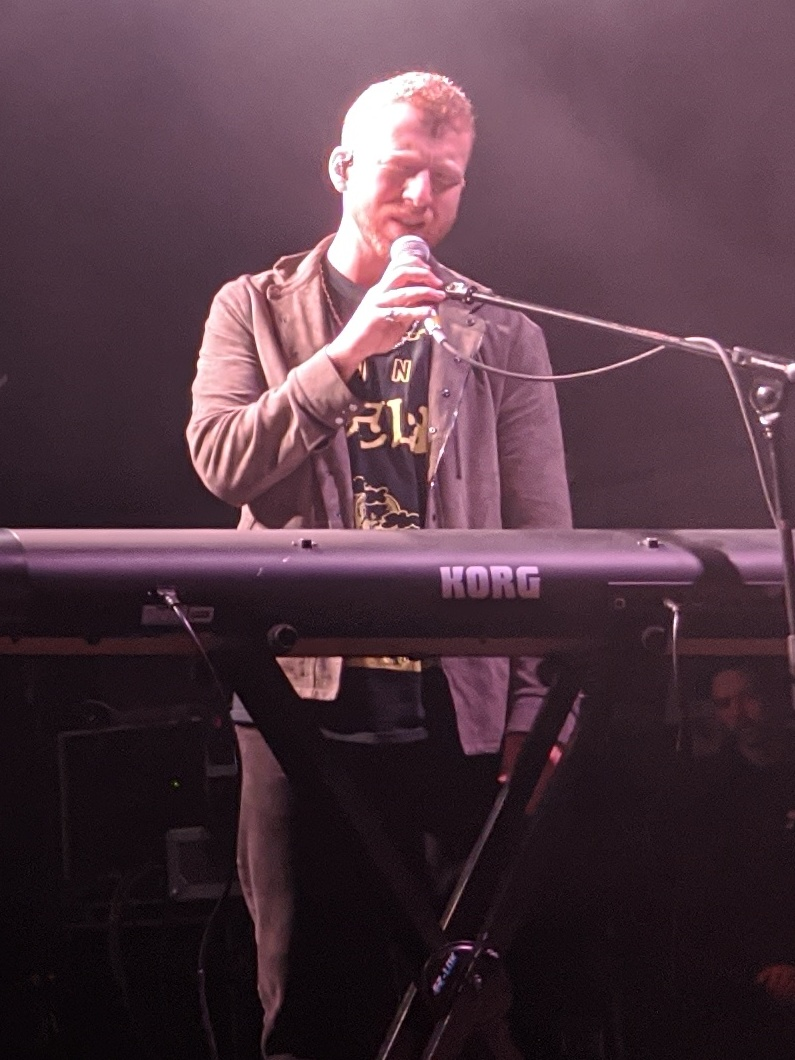
JP Saxe featured on "Maybe Don't" with Peters.

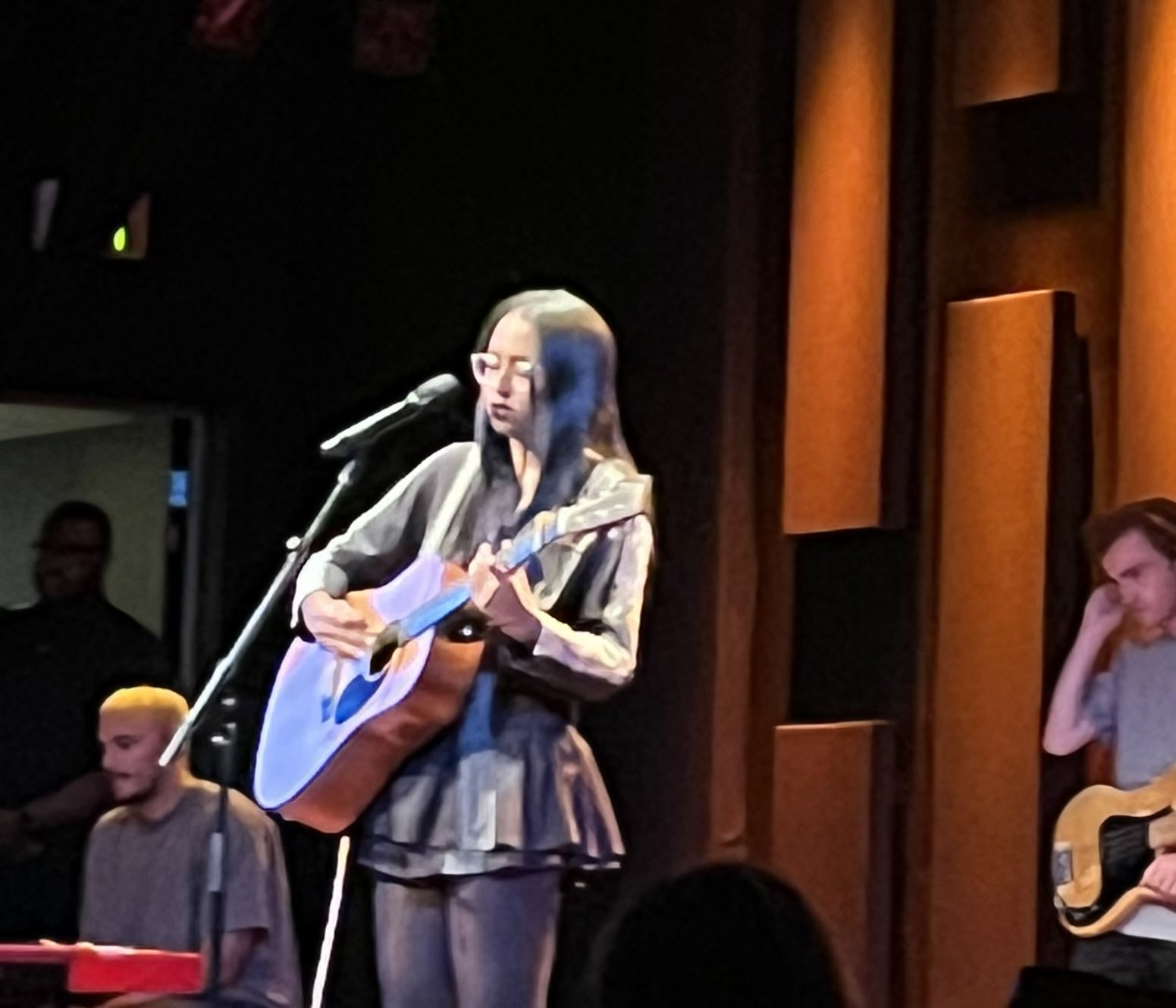
Peters featured on a remix of "Mother Wound" by Jensen McRae in 2026.

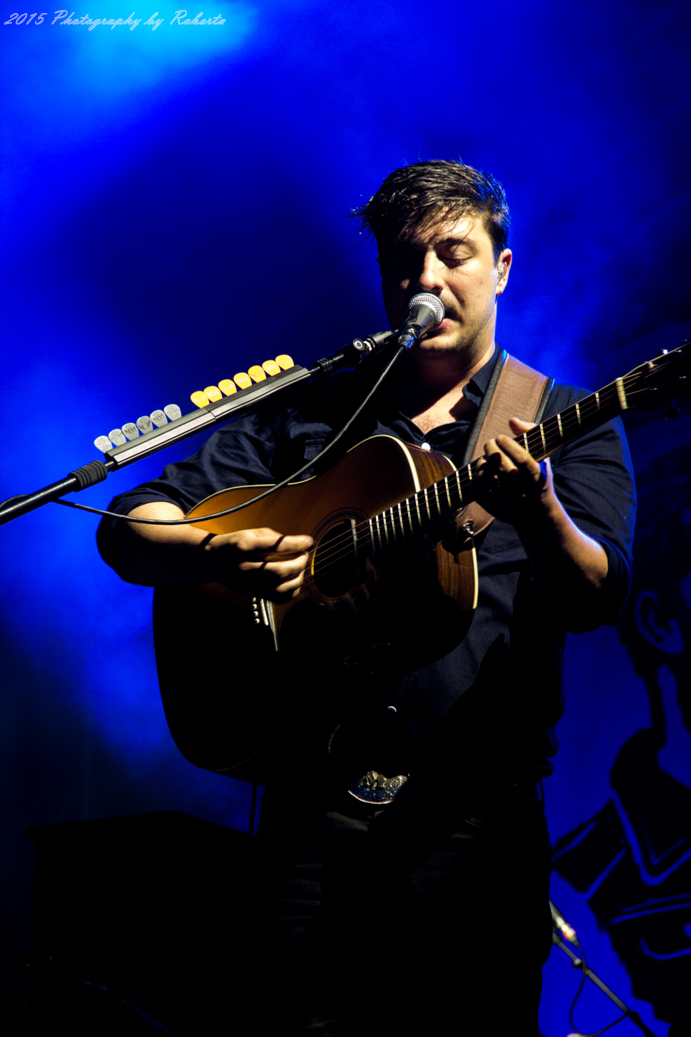
Marcus Mumford co-wrote "Say My Name in Your Sleep" with Peters, as well as appearing on "If You Let Me".

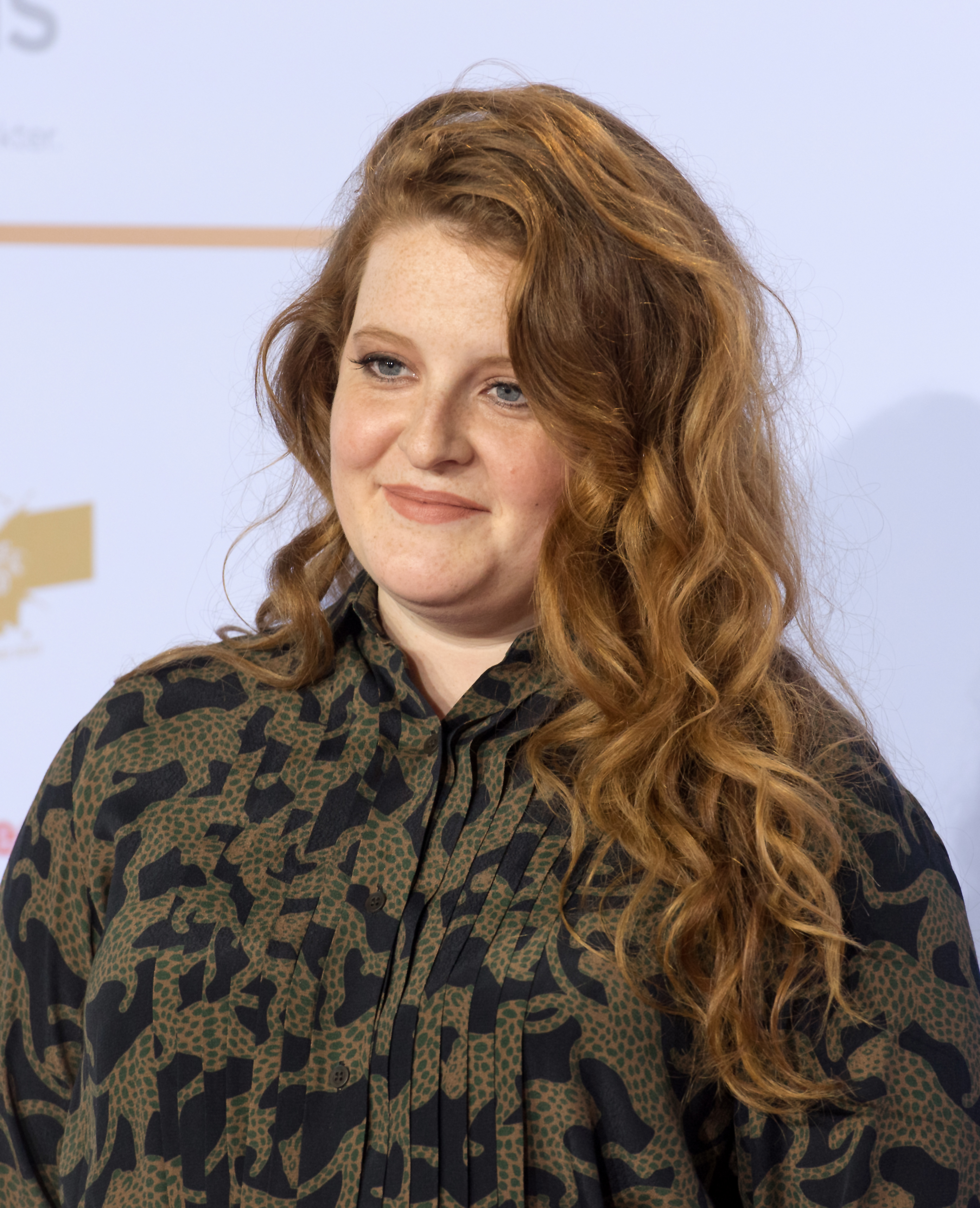
Frances has co-written numerous songs with Peters.

Key
‡	Indicates a single release
‡	Indicates song is a cover of another artist's previous work

Name of song, songwriter(s), originating album and year of release
Song	Artist(s)	Songwriter(s)	Originating album	Year	Ref.
"Adore You"	Maisie Peters	Maisie Peters; Fred Gibson	It's Your Bed Babe, It's Your Funeral	2019	
"A Good Love, Pt. 2"	Bear's Den featuring Maisie Peters	Andrew Davie	Trying: Season 2 (Apple TV+ Original Series Soundtrack)	2022	
"America Forever"	Gretta Ray (Note: Peters provided backing vocals for Ray on "America Forever".)	Gretta Ray; Caroline Pennell	Positive Spin	2023	
"April Showers"	Maisie Peters	Maisie Peters; Amy Allen; Two Inch Punch	It's Your Bed Babe, It's Your Funeral	2019	
"Architecture"	Maisie Peters	Maisie Peters; Brad Ellis; Ed Thomas	Dressed Too Nice for a Jacket	2018	
"Audrey Hepburn"	Maisie Peters	Maisie Peters; Joe Rubel	Florescence	2025	
"The Band and I"	Maisie Peters	Maisie Peters; Andrew Haas; Ian Franzino; Ines Dunn	The Good Witch	2023	
"Best I'll Ever Sing"	Maisie Peters	Maisie Peters; Brad Ellis; Jez Ashurst	Non-album single	2018	
"Between Me & You" (originally by Brandon Flowers)	Maisie Peters	Brandon Flowers	Apple Music London Sessions	2023	
"Birthday"	Maisie Peters	Maisie Peters; Brad Baloo	Non-album single	2017	
"Bit Bitter"	Maisie Peters	Maisie Peters; Joe Rubel	The Good Witch	2024 (Note: Despite The Good Witch originally being released in 2023, "Bit Bitter" was included on a vinyl variant of the album released on Record Store Day in 2024.)	
"Blonde"	Maisie Peters	Maisie Peters; Charlie Martin; Pablo Bowman	Non-album single	2022	
"Body Better"	Maisie Peters	Maisie Peters; Ines Dunn; Matias Tellez	The Good Witch	2023	
"Boy"	Maisie Peters	Maisie Peters; Ed Sheeran; Joe Rubel	You Signed Up for This	2021	
"Brooklyn"	Maisie Peters	Maisie Peters; Sophie Frances Cooke	You Signed Up for This	2021	
"BSC"	Maisie Peters	Maisie Peters; Brad Ellis; Jez Ashurst; Joe Rubel	The Good Witch	2023	
"Carried Away"	Maisie Peters	Maisie Peters; Nick Lobel	Florescence (Lilac Edition)	2026	
"Cate's Brother"	Maisie Peters	Maisie Peters; Max Grahn	Non-album single	2022	
"Cate's Brother (Matt's Version)"	Maisie Peters featuring Matt Maltese	Maisie Peters; Max Grahn	Non-album release	2022	
"Charlotte's Web"	Maisie Peters	Maisie Peters; Joe Rubel	Florescence (Lilac Edition)	2026	
"Christmas Lights" (originally by Coldplay)	Maisie Peters	Guy Berryman; Jonny Buckland; Will Champion; Chris Martin	Non-album release	2025	
"Coming of Age"	Maisie Peters	Maisie Peters; Tove Burman; Elvira Anderfjärd	The Good Witch	2023	
"Daydreams"	Maisie Peters	Maisie Peters; Daniel Tashian; Ian Fitchuk	Non-album single	2020	
"Details"	Maisie Peters	Maisie Peters; Jon Green	Dressed Too Nice for a Jacket	2018	
"The Drought (live from Sydney)"	Maisie Peters	Maisie Peters	Florescence (Golden Wattle Edition)	2026	
"Electric"	Maisie Peters	Maisie Peters	Non-album release	2015	
"Elvis Song"	Maisie Peters	Maisie Peters; Fred Gibson; Miranda Cooper; Johnny Christopher; Mark James; Wayne Carson Thompson	You Signed Up for This	2021	
"Enough for You"	Maisie Peters	Maisie Peters; Joe Rubel	Dressed Too Nice for a Jacket	2018	
"Favourite Ex"	Maisie Peters	Maisie Peters; Brad Ellis; Jez Ashurst	Non-album single	2019	
"Feels Like This"	Maisie Peters	Maisie Peters; Alex Montague; Brad Ellis; Louis Collard-Watson; Negin Djafari	Dressed Too Nice for a Jacket	2018	
"First Place"	Maisie Peters	Maisie Peters	Non-album release	2016	
"Flat Earther"	Maisie Peters	Maisie Peters; Jez Ashurst; Bradford Ellis	Florescence	2026	
"Funeral"	Maisie Peters featuring James Bay	Maisie Peters; James Bay; Joe Rubel	Trying: Season 2 (Apple TV+ Original Series Soundtrack)	2021	
"Girls House"	Maisie Peters	Maisie Peters	Non-album release	2023	
"Girls Just Flying"	Maisie Peters	Maisie Peters; Jon Green; Alysa Vanderheym	Florescence	2026	
"Glowing Review"	Maisie Peters	Maisie Peters; Joe Rubel	Trying: Season 2 (Apple TV+ Original Series Soundtrack)	2021	
"Good Enough"	Maisie Peters	Maisie Peters; Daniel Nigro	Non-album single	2022	
"The Good Witch"	Maisie Peters	Maisie Peters; Joe Rubel	The Good Witch	2023	
"Guy on a Horse"	Maisie Peters	Maisie Peters; Elvira Anderfjärd; Tove Burman	The Good Witch (Deluxe)	2023	
"Happy Hunting Ground"	Maisie Peters featuring Griff	Maisie Peters; Griff; Sophie Frances Cooke	Trying: Season 2 (Apple TV+ Original Series Soundtrack)	2021	
"Hands on Me"	Maisie Peters	Maisie Peters; Michael Pollack; Griff Clawson	Nobody Wants This: Season 3	2026	
"Helicopter"	Maisie Peters	Maisie Peters; Joe Rubel	Trying: Season 2 (Apple TV+ Original Series Soundtrack)	2021	
"History of Man"	Maisie Peters	Maisie Peters; Joe Rubel	The Good Witch	2023	
"Hollow"	Maisie Peters	Maisie Peters; Ed Sheeran; Joe Rubel; Johnny McDaid	You Signed Up for This	2021	
"Holy Revival"	Maisie Peters	Maisie Peters; Elvira Anderfjärd	The Good Witch (Deluxe)	2023	
"Houses"	Maisie Peters	Maisie Peters	Florescence	2026	
"If You Let Me"	Maisie Peters and Marcus Mumford	Maisie Peters; Marcus Mumford	Florescence	2026	
"I'll Be There for You (originally by the Rembrandts)	Maisie Peters	David Crane; Marta Kauffman; Allee Willis; Danny Wilde; Phil Sōlem	Spotify Singles	2018	
"I'm Trying (Not Friends)"	Maisie Peters	Maisie Peters; Joe Rubel	You Signed Up for This	2021	
"I Want You to Change (Because You Want to Change)"	Maisie Peters featuring Bear's Den	Maisie Peters; Joe Rubel	Trying: Season 2 (Apple TV+ Original Series Soundtrack)	2021	
"In My Head"	Maisie Peters	Maisie Peters; Fred Gibson	Dressed Too Nice For a Jacket	2018	
"John Hughes Movie"	Maisie Peters	Maisie Peters; Miranda Cooper; Henrik Barman Michelsen	You Signed Up for This	2021	
"Kingmaker"	Maisie Peters and Julia Michaels	Maisie Peters; Julia Michaels; Chloe Kraemer	Florescence	2026	
"The Last One"	Maisie Peters	Maisie Peters; Miranda Cooper; Henrik Barman Michelsen	The Good Witch (Deluxe)	2023	
"The List"	Maisie Peters	Maisie Peters; Sophie Frances Cooke	Non-album single	2020	
"Look at Me Now"	Maisie Peters	Maisie Peters; Rory Adams; Steve Robson	It's Your Bed Babe, It's Your Funeral	2019	
"Lost the Breakup"	Maisie Peters	Maisie Peters; Oscar Görres	The Good Witch	2023	
"Love Him I Don't"	Maisie Peters	Maisie Peters; Joe Rubel; Jon Green	You Signed Up for This	2021	
"Lunar Years"	Maisie Peters	Maisie Peters; Joe Rubel	Trying: Season 2 (Apple TV+ Original Series Soundtrack)	2021	
"Make it Out"	Henry Jamison featuring Maisie Peters	Henry Moses Jamison-Root; Maisie Peters	The Years	2022	
"Mary Janes"	Maisie Peters	Maisie Peters; Joe Rubel	Florescence	2026	
"Maybe Don't"	Maisie Peters featuring JP Saxe	Maisie Peters; Joe Rubel; Jonathan Percy Starker Saxe	Non-album single	2020	
"Milhouse"	Maisie Peters	Maisie Peters; Joe Rubel	Trying: Season 2 (Apple TV+ Original Series Soundtrack)	2021	
"Mine"	Maisie Peters	Maisie Peters	Non-album release	2016	
"Mother Wound"	Jensen McRae featuring Maisie Peters	Jensen McRae; Maisie Peters; Grant Averill; Joe London	I Don't Know How but They Found Me... Again!	2026	
"My Regards"	Maisie Peters	Maisie Peters; Ian Fitchuk; Nick Lobel	Florescence	2026	
"Neck of the Woods"	Maisie Peters	Maisie Peters; Joe Rubel	Trying: Season 2 (Apple TV+ Original Series Soundtrack)	2021	
"Not Another Rockstar"	Maisie Peters	Maisie Peters; Ines Dunn; Joe Rubel	Non-album single	2022	
"Nothing Like Being in Love"	Maisie Peters	Maisie Peters; Mikky Ekko; Jon Green	Florescence	2026	
"Old Fashioned"	Maisie Peters	Maisie Peters; Joe Rubel	Florescence	2026	
"One Last Try"	ReN featuring Maisie Peters	ReN; Jamil Kazmi; Soma Genda	Non-album single	2021	
"Outdoor Pool"	Maisie Peters	Maisie Peters; Joe Rubel; Jon Green	You Signed Up for This	2021	
"The Party"	Maisie Peters	Maisie Peters; Joe Rubel	Trying: Season 2 (Apple TV+ Original Series Soundtrack)	2021	
"Personal Best"	Maisie Peters	Maisie Peters; Josephine Vander Gucht; Anthony West	It's Your Bed Babe, It's Your Funeral	2019	
"Place We Were Made"	Maisie Peters	Maisie Peters; Bradford Ellis; Jez Ashurst	Non-album single	2017	
"Psycho"	Maisie Peters	Maisie Peters; Steve McCutcheon; Ed Sheeran	You Signed Up for This	2021	
"Questions"	Maisie Peters	Maisie Peters; Griff Clawson; Michael Pollack	Florescence	2026	
"Run"	Maisie Peters	Maisie Peters; Benjamin Ross Ash; Ines Dunn	The Good Witch	2023	
"Sad Girl Summer"	Maisie Peters	Maisie Peters; Andrew Haas; Ian Franzino; Steph Jones	Non-album single	2020	
"Sad Girl Summer (Emo Version)"	Maisie Peters	Maisie Peters; Andrew Haas; Ian Franzino; Steph Jones	Non-album release	2020	
"Say My Name in Your Sleep"	Maisie Peters	Maisie Peters; Marcus Mumford	Florescence	2025	
"Smile"	Maisie Peters	Maisie Peters; Benjamin Ross Ash	Birds of Prey: The Album	2020	
"Someone to Love"	Maisie Peters	Maisie Peters	Non-album release	2016	
"The Song"	Maisie Peters	Maisie Peters; Matt Maltese; Matias Tellez	The Good Witch (Deluxe)	2023	
"Song You'll Never Hear"	Sarcastic Sounds and Maisie Peters	Maisie Peters; Jeremy Fedryk	I'm a Disappointment	2021	
"Spring Clean"	Maisie Peters	Maisie Peters	Non-album release	2016	
"Stay Young"	Maisie Peters	Maisie Peters; RØMANS	Non-album single	2019	
"Take Care of Yourself"	Maisie Peters	Maisie Peters; James Earp	It's Your Bed Babe, It's Your Funeral	2019	
"Talking to Strangers"	Maisie Peters	Maisie Peters; Jez Ashurst; Bradford Ellis	You Signed Up for This	2021	
"Therapy"	Maisie Peters	Maisie Peters; Ines Dunn; Joe Housley; Charlie Martin	The Good Witch	2023	
"There It Goes"	Maisie Peters	Maisie Peters; Matias Tellez; Miranda Cooper	The Good Witch	2023	
"This is on You"	Maisie Peters	Maisie Peters; Sophie Frances Cooke	It's Your Bed Babe, It's Your Funeral	2019	
"Toast"	Maisie Peters	Maisie Peters	Non-album release	2016	
"Together This Christmas"	Maisie Peters	Maisie Peters; Joe Rubel	Non-album single	2022	
"Tough Act"	Maisie Peters	Maisie Peters; Joe Rubel; Sophie Frances Cooke	You Signed Up for This	2021	
"Truth Is"	Maisie Peters	Maisie Peters; Ines Dunn; Matias Tellez	The Good Witch (Deluxe)	2023	
"Two Weeks Ago"	Maisie Peters	Maisie Peters; Jez Ashurst; Brad Ellis	The Good Witch	2023	
"Use Me"	Maisie Peters	Maisie Peters	Non-album release	2017	
"Vampire Time"	Maisie Peters	Maisie Peters; Ines Dunn; Matias Tellez	Florescence	2026	
"Villain"	Maisie Peters	Maisie Peters; Rob Milton	You Signed Up for This	2021	
"Volcano"	Maisie Peters	Maisie Peters; Jez Ashurst; Bradford Ellis	You Signed Up for This	2021	
"Want You Back"	Maisie Peters	Maisie Peters; Joe Rubel	The Good Witch	2023	
"Watch"	Maisie Peters	Maisie Peters; Oscar Görres	The Good Witch	2023	
"Wendy"	Maisie Peters	Maisie Peters; Brad Ellis; Jez Ashurst; Joe Rubel	The Good Witch	2023	
"Worst of You"	Maisie Peters	Maisie Peters; Fred Gibson	Non-album single	2018	
"Yoko"	Maisie Peters	Maisie Peters; Jon Green	The Good Witch (Deluxe)	2023	
"You Then Me Now"	Maisie Peters	Maisie Peters; Jon Green; Natalie Hemby	Florescence	2026	
"You Signed Up for This"	Maisie Peters	Maisie Peters; Joe Rubel	You Signed Up for This	2021	
"You to You"	Maisie Peters	Maisie Peters; Benjamin Ash; John Foyle	Dressed Too Nice for a Jacket	2018	
"You're Just a Boy (and I'm Kinda the Man)"	Maisie Peters	Maisie Peters; Matias Tellez	The Good Witch	2023	
"You You You"	Maisie Peters	Maisie Peters; Alysa Vanderheym	Florescence	2025	
