= My Regards =

2026 single by Maisie Peters

Single by Maisie Peters

from the album Florescence
- Released: 6 February 2026
- Genre: Country pop
- Length: 3:11
- Label: Gingerbread Man; Atlantic
- Songwriters: Maisie Peters; Ian Fitchuk; Nick Lobel
- Producers: Maisie Peters; Ian Fitchuk; Nick Lobel

Maisie Peters singles chronology
"Say My Name in Your Sleep" (2025)	"My Regards" (2026)	"Kingmaker" (2026)

Music video
- "My Regards" on YouTube

"My Regards" is a song recorded by English singer-songwriter Maisie Peters. It was released by Gingerbread Man and Atlantic Records on 6 February 2026 as the fourth single from Peters' third studio album, Florescence (2026). She co-wrote and co-produced the song with Ian Fitchuk and Nick Lobel.

The lyrical content of the song explores Peters' desire to protect her romantic partner from other people that are interested in him. She felt she had not ventured into her tongue-in-cheek style of writing prior to the song and was inspired by country music classics about standing by your partner. A music video for the track starring Peters and Benito Skinner as love interests was released, directed by Amelia Dimoldenberg.

== Background ==
Peters' second studio album, The Good Witch, was released in 2023. The genres featured in the album were predominantly pop-oriented, however, she was hopeful that people would notice the maturity developed in her songwriting between The Good Witch and her debut album, You Signed Up for This (2021).

Alongside numerous tours, Peters opened for Taylor Swift's Eras Tour at Wembley Stadium on 19 August 2024. Peters was then set to support Kelsea Ballerini on her North American arena tour, but pulled out. She cited prioritising her mental health as one of the main reasons for doing so, as well as wanting to complete her third studio album to the best of her ability. Peters returned to music in October 2025 with the dual release of "Audrey Hepburn" and "You You You". They acted as the dual lead singles from her third studio album, later confirmed to be Florescence (2026). They were followed by the third single, "Say My Name in Your Sleep".

== Composition and lyrics ==
Peters co-wrote and co-produced the country pop track alongside Ian Fitchuk and Nick Lobel. Prior to writing for Florescence, Peters felt that she had not ventured into the tongue-in-cheek or sexy elements of her writing. She became inspired by country "stand by your man songs" but wanted to modernise the narrative rather than portray herself as a "simpering love interest". She instead wrote it from the perspective of a fierce woman protecting her romantic partner. Peters references the 1992 film The Bodyguard within the lyrics, with Euphoria noticing that Peters tends to reference cult classics within her songs.

== Music video ==
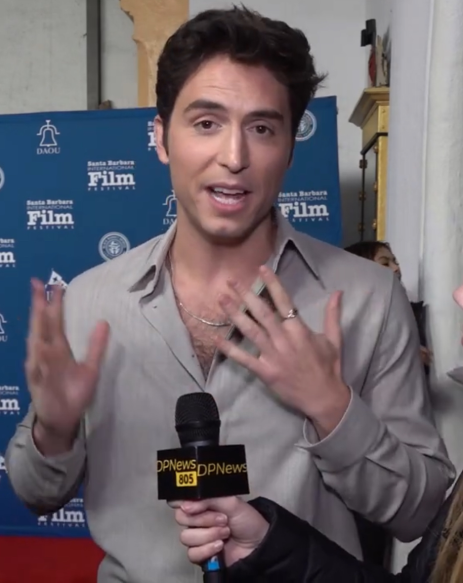
Benito Skinner portrays Peters' love interest in the music video for "My Regards".

A music video for "My Regards" was released alongside the song. It was directed by Amelia Dimoldenberg and starred Peters alongside Benito Skinner. Upon Dimoldenberg's initial listen of the track, she knew that she wanted to lean into Peters' storytelling and became inspired by The Bodyguard, which is referenced in the lyrics. She had Peters portray the bodyguard of her partner, portrayed by Skinner. She said: "I thought it would be interesting to subvert the 'possessive girlfriend' trope by making Maisie a literal bodyguard. It felt like a fun way to heighten the narrative." Peters told I-D that she had initially planned a different video in her head; she envisioned a country-and-Western film style video, with Peters on a horse and her boyfriend behind her. However, she preferred Dimoldenberg's idea and they agreed on casting Skinner. CelebMix billed the video the older sister to Peters' 2021 music video for "Psycho".

== Critical reception ==
The song was praised by critics. CelebMix billed it "a standout offering" for her, opining that it showcases her skills strongly. When the Horn Blows described "My Regards" as "delightfully sharp, unapologetically cheeky, and undeniably addictive". They appreciated her storytelling, her vocal ability and the lyricism within the track.

== Credits and personnel ==
Credits adapted from Spotify.

- Maisie Peters – vocals, songwriting, production
- Ian Fitchuk – production, bass, drums, guitar, percussion
- Nick Lobel – production, songwriting, drums, guitar, percussion, programming, vocal engineering
- Doug Showalter – keyboards
- Peter Groenwald – backing vocals
- Adam Burt – assistant mastering
- Dale Becker – mastering
- Jesse Broc – engineering
- Jon Castelli – mixing
- Katie Harvey – assistant mixing
- Konrad Snyder – vocal engineering
- Noah McCorkle – assistant mastering

== Charts ==
Chart performance for "My Regards"
Chart (2026)	Peak position
Germany Airplay (BVMI)	53
New Zealand Hot Singles (RMNZ)	21

== Release history ==
Region	Date	Format	Label	Ref.
Various	6 February 2026	Digital download; streaming	Gingerbread Man; Atlantic	
