= Kingmaker (song) =

2026 single by Maisie Peters

Single by Maisie Peters and Julia Michaels

from the album Florescence
- Released: 21 April 2026
- Length: 3:08
- Label: Gingerbread Man; Atlantic
- Songwriters: Maisie Peters; Julia Michaels; Chloe Kraemer
- Producers: Maisie Peters; Julia Michaels; Chloe Kraemer

Maisie Peters singles chronology
| "My Regards" (2026) | "Kingmaker" (2026) | "Hands on Me" (2026) |

Julia Michaels singles chronology
| "No Heartbreak's Killed Me Yet" (2025) | "Kingmaker" (2026) |

Lyric video
- "Kingmaker" on YouTube

"Kingmaker" is a song recorded by English singer-songwriter Maisie Peters and American singer-songwriter Julia Michaels. It was released by Gingerbread Man and Atlantic Records on 21 April 2026 as the fifth single from Peters' third studio album, Florescence (2026). She co-wrote and co-produced the song with Michaels, as well as Chloe Kraemer.

The lyrical content of "Kingmaker" explores the lack of acknowledgement that woman receive when they better their male partners and was loosely inspired by the Hilary Mantel novel Wolf Hall (2009). Peters felt that Michaels was the perfect collaborator for the song, since they had shared experiences with the lyrical content. Both singers praised their experiences writing with each other, particularly Peters, who cited Michaels as an early songwriting inspiration for her.

== Background ==
Peters' second studio album, The Good Witch, was released in 2023. The genres featured in the album were predominantly pop-oriented, however, she was hopeful that people would notice the maturity developed in her songwriting between The Good Witch and her debut album, You Signed Up for This (2021). After a break from music that involved numerous tours, Peters returned to music in October 2025 with the dual release of "Audrey Hepburn" and "You You You". They acted as the dual lead singles from her upcoming third studio album. They were followed by "Say My Name in Your Sleep" and "My Regards", after which it was confirmed that they would all feature on her third studio album, Florescence (2026). The fifth single from the album was later confirmed to be "Kingmaker" and was released on 21 April 2026.

== Composition and lyrics ==
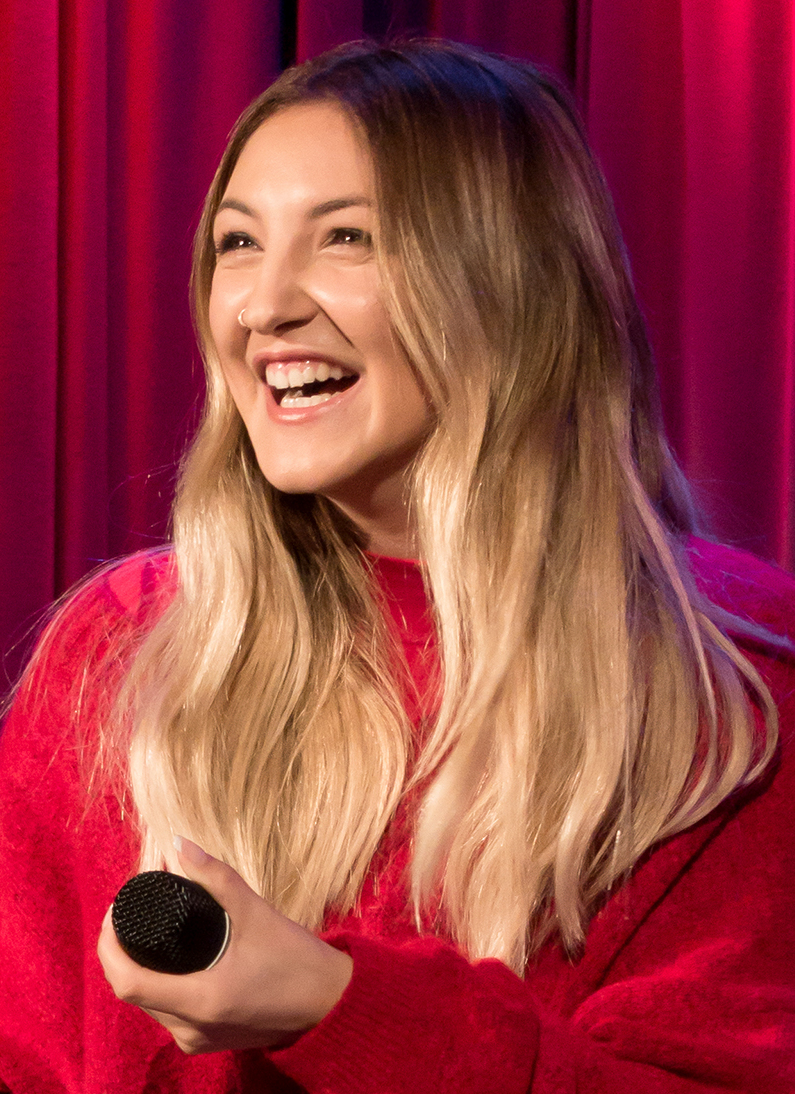
Peters billed Julia Michaels as the perfect collaborator for "Kingmaker" due to their shared experiences.

As well as recording the song with American singer-songwriter Julia Michaels, Peters co-wrote and co-produced it alongside her too. Chloe Kraemer also received co-writing and co-producing credits. Peters had long been a fan of Michaels, having listened to her music since the age of 16. She cited Michaels as one of her songwriting inspirations, billing "Issues" her "national anthem" and stated that releasing a song with her was a "dream come true". In turn, Michaels complimented her time writing with Peters, stating: "when you write with her you feel completely immersed in her world. You feel like you’ve lived it yourself."

The lyrical content of "Kingmaker" dissects power dynamics within gender, focusing on the lack of acknowledgement that woman receive when they better the lives their male partners. It explores the sting of realising that a man did not deserve them or how they have bettered their life, especially after giving them the benefit of the doubt. The song's lyrical content was loosely inspired by the Hilary Mantel novel Wolf Hall (2009). On the lyrics, Peters explained it is "chiefly about being a woman and feeling like you've offered your time, wisdom, talent, and belief to someone who has then taken advantage of it".

Peters felt that Michaels was the perfect collaborative partner for "Kingmaker", since she felt they had both had experiences of achieving success and witnessing the impact it had on their romantic relationships. They had both specifically bonded over the egos of former male partners, who had wanted a strong and successful woman until it "made them bitter". They intentionally wrote and recorded "Kingmaker" as a song that goes line for line, as opposed to verse for verse. They wanted the song to be heard as a conversation between friends who are bonding over shared experiences, which they felt mirrored the songwriting process.

== Critical reception ==
Mystic Sons called "Kingmaker" a "sharp, emotionally charged collaboration". Broken 8 Music complimented the decision for the singers to sing line by line, noting that it felt "remarkably organic".

== Credits and personnel ==
Credits adapted from Spotify.

- Maisie Peters – vocals, songwriting, production
- Julia Michaels – vocals, songwriting, production
- Chloe Kraemer – songwriting, production, engineering, drum programming
- Ian Fitchuk – assistant production, keyboards, programming
- Adam Burt – assistant mastering
- Brad Lauchert – mixing engineer
- Dale Becker – mastering engineer
- Jon Castelli – mixing
- Katie Harvey – assistant mastering
- Konrad Snyder – vocal recording engineer
- Noah McCorkle – assistant mastering

== Release history ==
| Region | Date | Format | Label | Ref. |
|---|---|---|---|---|
| Various | 21 April 2026 | Digital download; streaming | Gingerbread Man; Atlantic | |
