= History of Man =

History of Man may refer to:

- "History of Man" (song), a song by Maisie Peters from The Good Witch (2023)
- Human history, the history of humanity
- History of the Isle of Man
- Scientology: A History of Man, a book by L. Ron Hubbard
