= Say My Name in Your Sleep =

2025 single by Maisie Peters

Single by Maisie Peters

from the album Florescence
- Written: November 2024
- Released: 19 November 2025
- Recorded: November 2024
- Genre: Folk-pop
- Length: 3:12
- Label: Gingerbread Man; Atlantic
- Songwriters: Maisie Peters; Marcus Mumford
- Producers: Maisie Peters; Ian Fitchuk; Marcus Mumford

Maisie Peters singles chronology
"Audrey Hepburn" / "You You You" (2025)	"Say My Name in Your Sleep" (2025)	"My Regards" (2026)

Lyric video
- "Say My Name in Your Sleep" on YouTube

"Say My Name in Your Sleep" is a song recorded by English singer-songwriter Maisie Peters. It was released by Gingerbread Man and Atlantic Records on 19 November 2025 as the third single from Peters' third studio album, Florescence (2026). Peters worked on the song with frequent collaborator Ian Fitchuk, as well as singer-songwriters Marcus Mumford and Gretta Ray.

The lyrical content of the song explores constantly looking back on a past relationship, while also being mature enough to know it was not a right fit. It is loosely inspired by the 1938 novel Rebecca by Daphne du Maurier and Peters was praised for taking on a "literary-leaning sound". It has been said to fit within the theme of Florescence, which is about love that lasts forever.

== Background ==
Peters' second studio album, The Good Witch, was released in 2023. The genres featured in the album were predominantly pop-oriented, however, she was hopeful that people would notice the maturity developed in her songwriting between The Good Witch and her debut album, You Signed Up for This (2021).

Alongside numerous tours, Peters opened for Taylor Swift's Eras Tour at Wembley Stadium on 19 August 2024. Peters was then set to support Kelsea Ballerini on her North American arena tour, but pulled out. She cited prioritising her mental health as one of the main reasons for doing so, as well as wanting to complete her third studio album to the best of her ability. Peters returned to music in October 2025 with the dual release of "Audrey Hepburn" and "You You You". They acted as the dual lead singles from her third studio album, later announced to be Florescence (2026). She subsequently performed two shows in London and New York, titled Before the Bloom, where she played new, unreleased material.

== Composition and lyrics ==
"Say My Name in Your Sleep" marks the first collaboration between Peters and fellow folk singer-songwriter Marcus Mumford. It was confirmed that more collaborative content between the pair would appear on Florescence. She recalled writing the song with Mumford at Real World Studios in "deep winter" with "something magical and spooky in the air there", which she believed had translated into the sound of the track. As well as co-writing the track, Mumford also has co-producing credits and provided backing vocals. Australian singer-songwriter and frequent collaborator Gretta Ray also provided backing vocals, as well as regular contributor Ian Fitchuk co-producing.

Peters explained the theme of the song as "both haunting and being haunted". The lyrical content explores constantly looking back on a past relationship, while also being mature enough to know it was not a right fit and wishing them the best. It was loosely inspired by the 1938 novel Rebecca by Daphne du Maurier, with CelebMix noting the "mature, literary-leaning sound" of the track. Peters added: "It's about having a tiny, secret sliver of your heart that still, deep down, hopes and prays they think of you – just a little, just when it's dark, just when they hear that song on the radio. It's about letting go, begrudgingly, but letting your shadow linger a moment too long." On its place on Florescence, Euphoria magazine noted that it fits within the theme of "love that lasts forever, for better or worse".

== Credits and personnel ==
Credits adapted from Spotify.

- Maisie Peters – vocals, songwriting, production
- Marcus Mumford – backing vocals, songwriting, production
- Ian Fitchuk – production, bass, drums, keyboards, percussion, piano
- Todd Lombardo – banjo, guitar
- Adam Burt – assistant mastering
- Brad Lauchert – mixing
- Brandon Bost – engineering
- Dale Becker – mastering
- Jon Castelli – mixing
- Katie Harvey – assistant mastering
- Konrad Snyder – engineering
- Matt Wiggins – engineering
- Gretta Ray – backing vocals

== Charts ==
Chart performance for "Say My Name in Your Sleep"
Chart (2025)	Peak position
Japan Hot Overseas (Billboard Japan)	19

== Release history ==
Region	Date	Format	Label	Ref.
Various	19 November 2025	Digital download; streaming	Gingerbread Man; Atlantic	
