= Audrey Hepburn (song) =

2025 single by Maisie Peters

Single by Maisie Peters

from the album Florescence
- A-side: "You You You" (double A-side)
- Released: 9 October 2025
- Label: Gingerbread Man; Atlantic
- Songwriters: Maisie Peters; Joe Rubel
- Producers: Maisie Peters; Joe Rubel; Ian Fitchuk

Maisie Peters singles chronology
"There It Goes" (2023)	"Audrey Hepburn" / "You You You" (2025)	"Say My Name in Your Sleep" (2025)

Lyric video
- "Audrey Hepburn" on YouTube

"Audrey Hepburn" is a song recorded by English singer-songwriter Maisie Peters. It was released by Gingerbread Man and Atlantic Records on 9 October 2025 as the dual lead single from Peters' third studio album, Florescence (2026). Peters worked on the song with frequent collaborator Joe Rubel, as well as Ian Fitchuk.

"Audrey Hepburn" marked a sonic shift for Peters, as the song was a return to her acoustic and folk sound, following her dance-pop album The Good Witch (2023). The lyrical content of the track explores the strength and peace that love has brought Peters. She promoted the release of the song with three intimate live shows, as well as releasing "You You You" alongside it as a surprise.

== Background ==
Peters' second studio album, The Good Witch, was released in 2023. The genres featured in the album were predominantly pop-oriented, however, she was hopeful that people would notice the maturity developed in her songwriting between The Good Witch and her debut album, You Signed Up for This (2021). Following its release, she won the inaugural Rolling Stone UK Breakthrough Award in 2023.

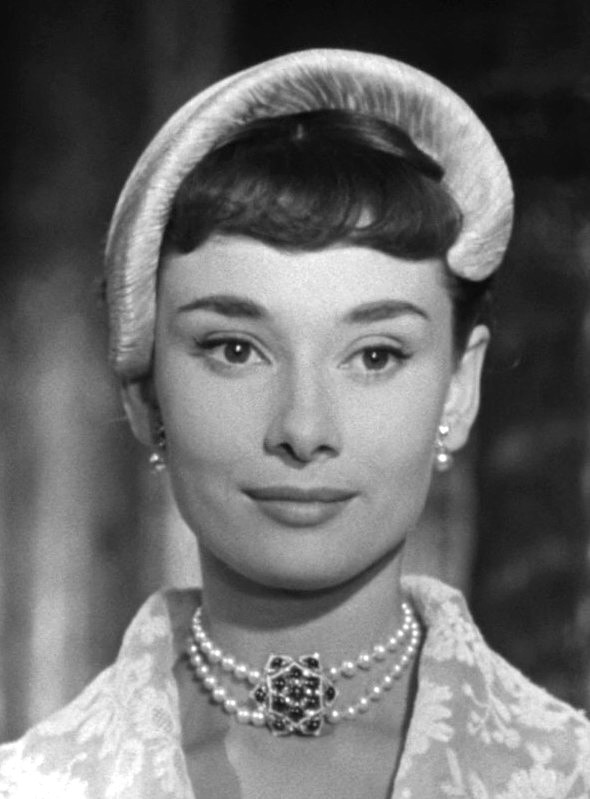
The lyrics of the track see Peters' romantic interest likening her to film and fashion icon Audrey Hepburn.

Alongside numerous tours, Peters opened for Taylor Swift's Eras Tour at Wembley Stadium on 19 August 2024. Peters was then set to support Kelsea Ballerini on her North American arena tour, but pulled out. She cited prioritising her mental health as one of the main reasons for doing so, as well as wanting to complete her third studio album to the best of her ability. In May 2025, Peters launched the podcast Twinhood, alongside her twin sister, Ellen Peters. She began teasing new music on Twinhood and later announced "Audrey Hepburn" on an episode.

== Composition and lyrics ==
In September 2025, Peters began posting various teasers of "Audrey Hepburn" on social media. The song marked a sonic shift from The Good Witch, with Peters returning to her "more stripped-back style of songwriting" that she launched her career upon. She described "Audrey Hepburn" as a song about "the strength and peace that real, true, honest love brings you, how it picks you up, dusts you off and, at least in [her] experience, points you all the way home". She announced via social media that "Audrey Hepburn" would be released on 9 October 2025, as well as revealing the cover art for the single. She co-wrote and co-produced the song with frequent collaborator Joe Rubel, as well as Ian Fitchuk supporting on the production.

Speaking to The Line of Best Fit about the song, Peters said that for her, it defines her "life in recent times" and her third studio album, later announced to be Florescence. She added that the song explores love being "a safe place and an escape from the mania of my life in the last few years". Alongside its release, she released the single "You You You" as a surprise. The two songs are lyrically and sonically vastly different, but Peters thought of them as connected. Wanting listeners to experience the two songs at the same time, she released them as a double A-side. She promoted the release with three intimate live shows: two in London and one in New York City. Nell Mescal supported the London shows.

== Credits and personnel ==
Credits adapted from Spotify.

- Maisie Peters – vocals, songwriting, production
- Joe Rubel – songwriting, production, engineering
- Ian Fitchuk – production
- Adam Burt – assistant mastering
- Brad Lauchert – mixing engineer
- Dale Becker – mastering
- Jon Castelli – mixing
- Katie Harvey – assistant mastering
- Konrad Snyder – engineering
- Noah McCorkle – assistant mastering
- Peter Groenwald – backing vocals
- Todd Lombardo – guitar

== Charts ==
Chart performance for "Audrey Hepburn"
Chart (2025)	Peak position
New Zealand Hot Singles (RMNZ)	33

== Release history ==
Region	Date	Format	Label	Ref.
Various	9 October 2025	Digital download; streaming	Gingerbread Man; Atlantic	
