= Florescence =

Studio album by Maisie Peters
- Released: 22 May 2026
- Recorded: 2023–2025
- Genre: Folk pop
- Length: 48:51
- Labels: Gingerbread Man; Atlantic
- Producers: Jez Ashurst; Griff Clawson; Bradford Ellis; Ian Fitchuk; Jon Green; Chloe Kraemer; Nick Lobel; Marcus Mumford; Michael Pollack; Maisie Peters; Joe Rubel; Matias Tellez; Alysa Vanderheym

Maisie Peters chronology
The Good Witch (2023)	Florescence (2026)

Singles from Florescence
- 1. "Audrey Hepburn" / "You You You" Released: 9 October 2025; 2. "Say My Name in Your Sleep" Released: 19 November 2025; 3. "My Regards" Released: 6 February 2026; 4. "Kingmaker" Released: 21 April 2026

Florescence is the third studio album by English singer-songwriter Maisie Peters. It was released on 22 May 2026 through Gingerbread Man and Atlantic Records and marks her first album since The Good Witch (2023). It was preceded by the release of five singles: double A-sides "You You You" and "Audrey Hepburn", followed by "Say My Name in Your Sleep", "My Regards" and "Kingmaker", the latter of which was a collaboration with Julia Michaels. The album also features a collaboration with Marcus Mumford and marks Peters' first albums to boast featured artists.

In a deviation from the pop sound of her previous studio album, Florescence sees Peters explore folk-pop and country pop sounds. Its lyrical content is centered around Peters feeling as though she has found requited love, looking back on former relationships distastefully, viral hate she received after opening for Taylor Swift's Eras Tour, her insecurities and being protective of her partner, amongst other themes. Florescence has been well-received by critics, who praised the shift in genre and Peters' songwriting ability. The album has been promoted with various tours, as well as a headline show at the O2 Arena in London.

== Background ==
Peters' second studio album, The Good Witch, was released in 2023. The genres featured in the album were predominantly pop-oriented, however, she was hopeful that people would notice the maturity developed in her songwriting between The Good Witch and her debut album, You Signed Up for This (2021). A commercial success, it became her first album to chart at number one on the UK Album Charts. Peters also became the youngest solo British female artist in almost a decade to chart number one on the UK Charts, after Ella Henderson in 2014. She then won the inaugural Rolling Stone UK Breakthrough Award that same year.

Alongside numerous tours, Peters opened for Taylor Swift's Eras Tour at Wembley Stadium on 19 August 2024. Peters was then set to support Kelsea Ballerini on her North American arena tour, but pulled out. She cited prioritising her mental health as one of the main reasons for doing so, as well as wanting to complete her third album to the best of her ability. During her break from touring, Peters reckoned she had written at least 60 songs for Florescence.

== Promotion and release ==
In May 2025, Peters launched the podcast Twinhood alongside her twin sister, Ellen Peters. She began teasing new music on Twinhood and later announced the release of single "Audrey Hepburn" on an episode. The song was released on 9 October 2025, alongside a surprise double A-side single, "You You You". The two songs are lyrically and sonically vastly different, but Peters thought of her fans as connected. Wanting listeners to experience the two songs at the same time, she released them as together. She promoted their release with Before the Bloom, three intimate live shows: two in London and one in New York City. "Say My Name in Your Sleep" was released as the third single on 19 November 2025. She performed the song on BBC Radio 1's Live Lounge in December of that year.

Peters announced Florescence on 28 January 2026. It was announced through a trailer directed by Amelia Dimoldenberg, starring Peters and Georgia Groome; Groome donned an olive costume as an homage to one of her scenes in the 2006 cult classic film Angus, Thongs and Perfect Snogging. Peters donned a daisy costume in the trailer, as a reference to her fans being known as "Daisies", and the album's title meaning "the process of flowering / of developing richly and fully". The cover artwork was shot on film in the British countryside, nearby to where Peters grew up. It features Peters lying in a field with the shadow of a flower across her cheek. When positioned the right way, Peters looks peaceful, but when turned around, it displays her frowning with an almost-sad expression. She chose the photo intentionally to showcase the range of emotions throughout the record, describing them as "sadness or melancholy [...] as well as the hope, love, and joy".

Alongside the trailer and announcement of the initial release date for 15 May 2026, she announced that the Before the Bloom tour had been extended, with European, Australian and American legs. The tour ran from March to April 2026. Dimoldenberg returned to her director position to direct a music video for "My Regards", the fourth single from the album. It starred Peters and Benito Skinner as love interests and pays homage to the 1992 film The Bodyguard.

On 21 April, Peters released "Kingmaker" as the fifth single from Florescence. It featured American singer-songwriter Julia Michaels. Later that month, she announced that the release date for the album had been moved to 22 May, a week later than originally planned, due to reasons beyond her control. On the day of the album's release, tickets became available for her May 2027 headline show at the O2 Arena, the biggest headline show of her career to date.

On iTunes, Peters released Florescence (Lilac Edition) as a digital download, featuring two bonus tracks: "Charlotte's Web" and "Carried Away". On 25 May, Peters announced and released Florescence (Golden Wattle Edition) as a digital download in Australia, including the bonus track "The Drought (Live From Sydney)".

== Composition ==
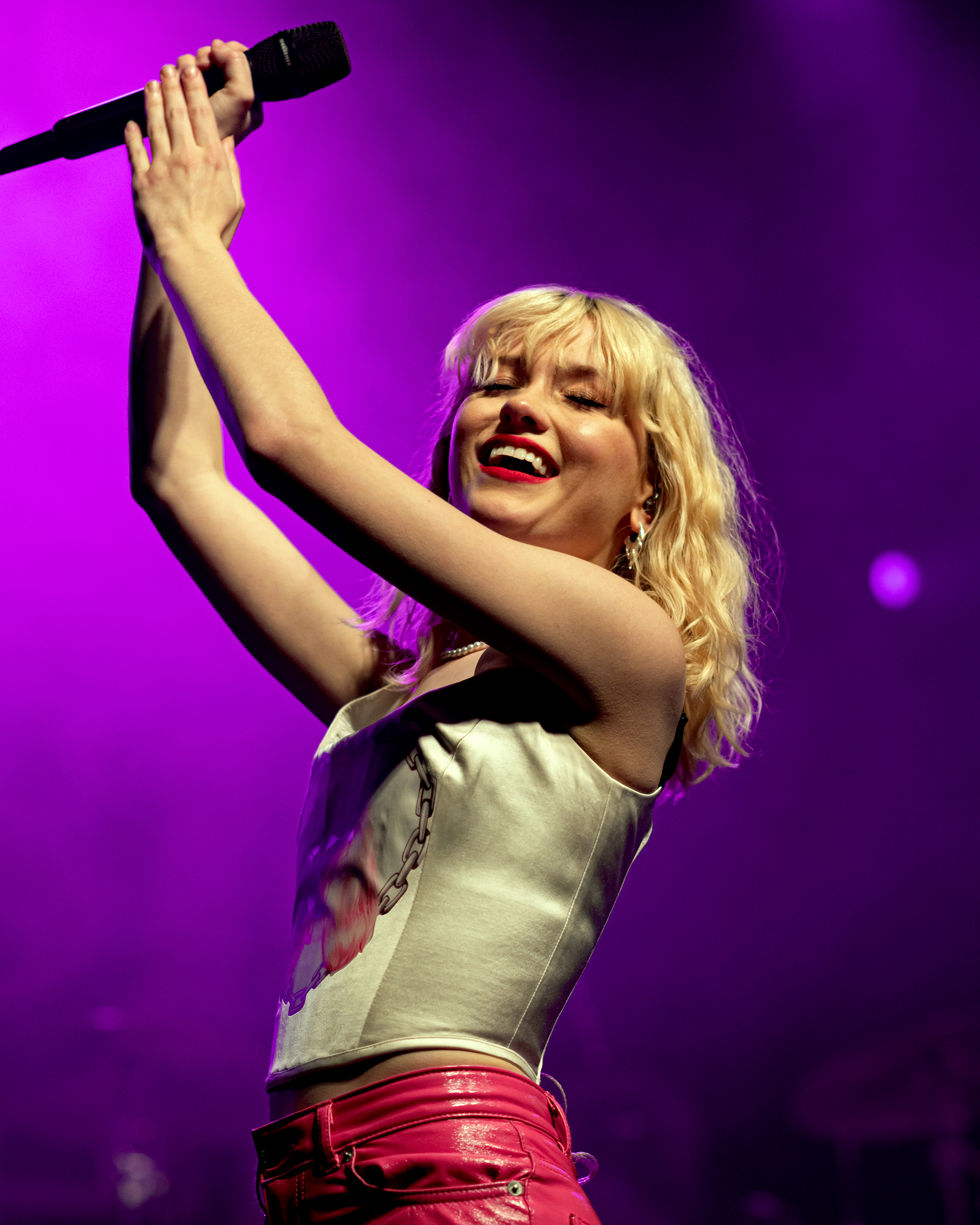
"Mary Janes", the opening track on Florescence, sees Peters address viral hate she received after opening for Taylor Swift.

On the essence of Florescence, Peters said that the tracks "depict a blossoming" of herself from the ages of 23 to 25, as well as "a blossoming of a true, real love that anchors both [her] and this record". Having risen to notability for songs about pettiness and being scorned, she reminded herself during the writing process of Florescence that she is "a hopeful and forgiving person" and no longer holds as much resentment towards people. She felt it to be a true representation of healing and finding hope, peace and strength, not only in someone else, but also in herself. Peters admitted that it was harder to write about happiness than sadness and heartbreak. Florescence was primarily written and recorded in Nashville and features Peters making her debut as a co-producer throughout the entire album.

Florescence opens with "Mary Janes", an intentional decision from Peters. On the song, Peters addresses her insecurities and viral hate she received after supporting Swift on the Eras Tour. The majority of the hate was directed towards her vocals showcased in a clipped video of her performing the spoken word bridge in "Lost the Breakup". At the time, she responded by posting a Spotify link to "Mean" by Swift, a song that addresses mean comments. Upon the release of the album, she stated that she has "very thick skin" but the comments made permeated with her since she was struggling with vocal polyps at the time.

Peters co-wrote and co-produced folk-pop song "Audrey Hepburn", the second track on the album, with frequent collaborator Joe Rubel, as well as Ian Fitchuk supporting on the production. Showcasing Peters' "more stripped-back style of songwriting", the lyrical content explores the strength and peace that real love has brought to her. It also features her romantic interest likening her to film and fashion icon Audrey Hepburn. The following track, "Say My Name in Your Sleep", saw the first of Peters' collaborative efforts with singer-songwriter Marcus Mumford on the album. She co-wrote the folk-pop song with Mumford at Real World Studios in "deep winter" with "something magical and spooky in the air there", which she believed had translated into the sound of the track. Gretta Ray also provided backing vocals. The lyrics explore constantly looking back on a past relationship, while also being mature enough to know it was not a right fit and wishing them the best. It was loosely inspired by the 1938 novel Rebecca by Daphne du Maurier, with CelebMix noting the "mature, literary-leaning sound" of the track.

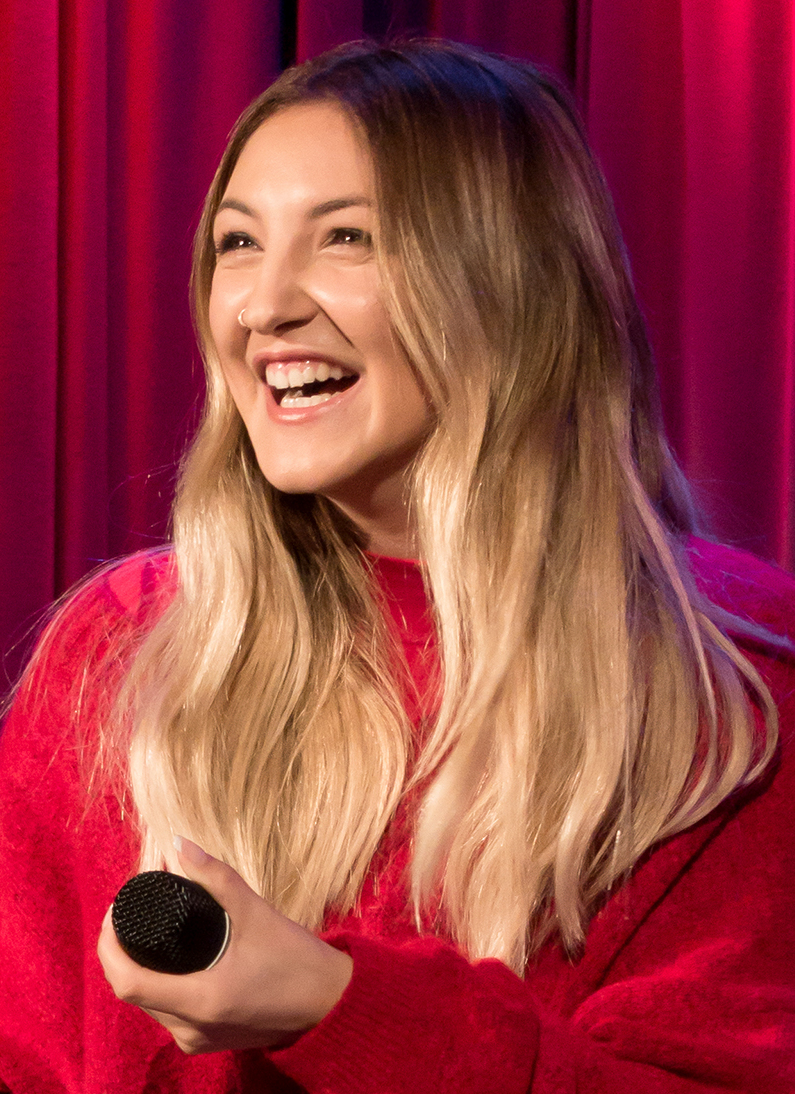
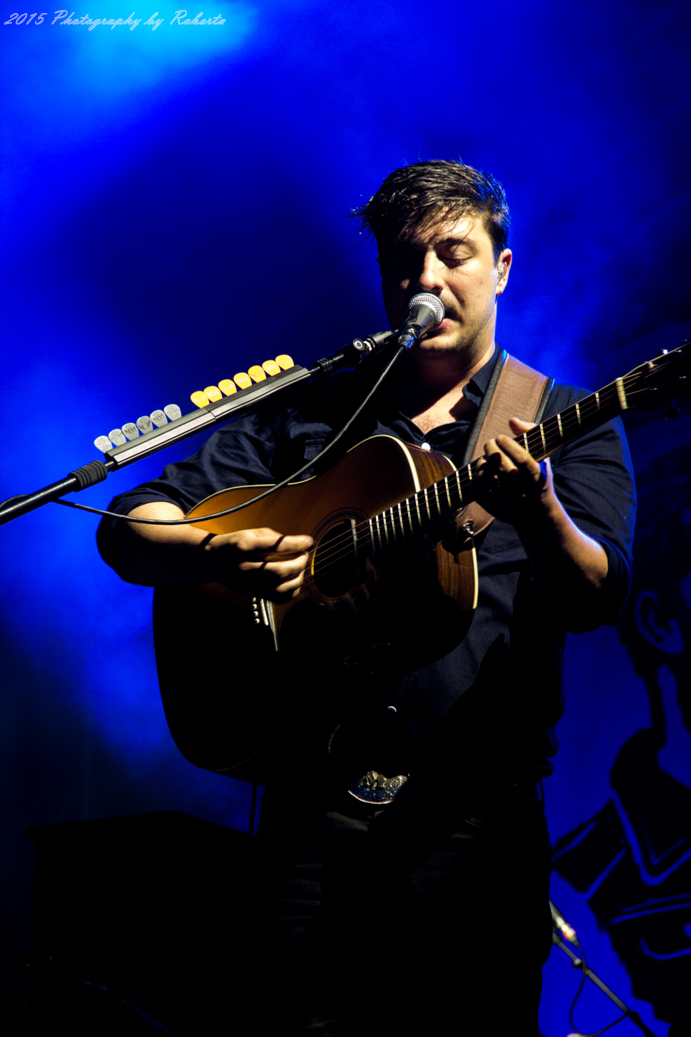
Florescence features collaborations from Julia Michaels (left) and Marcus Mumford. (right)

On "Old Fashioned", the fourth song, Peters judges a former partner for putting on an act to impress women. Described by NME as "a gently stomping piece of Americana", the chorus revolves around Peters judging his choice of cocktail, an old fashioned. "Houses" follows and was written solely by Peters. Following her writing the track alone, she revealed on The Zach Sang Show that she intends on one day releasing an album only written by her. Its lyrical content dissects Peters thinking about the lives she could have had if she stayed with former partners and her thankfulness for not having pursued those relationships further. The sixth song on Florescence, "Kingmaker", features American singer-songwriter Julia Michaels. Alongside Peters, Michaels also co-wrote and co-produced the track. Its lyrical content, which explores power dynamics within gender, were loosely inspired by Hilary Mantel's historical novel Wolf Hall (2009). Peters enjoyed making the song with Michaels since they shared fellow experiences of a man wanting a strong and successful woman until it made their former partner bitter. They intentionally created it as a duet that went line for line as opposed to verse for verse, since they wanted it to sound like a conversation between friends exchanging experiences. It was likened to music of CMAT and Self Esteem, with her "inherent Britishness" on display throughout the song.

"Vampire Time" has been described as a "gorgeous love song". Both that and "My Regards" have been noted as country pop songs. Prior to writing for Florescence, Peters felt that she had not ventured into the tongue-in-cheek or sexy elements of her writing. She became inspired by country "stand by your man songs" but wanted to modernise the narrative rather than portray herself as a "simpering love interest". She instead wrote it from the perspective of a fierce woman protecting her romantic partner. "You You You", the ninth song of Florescence, dissects an obsession with a relationship that ended. The production of the song is simple, featuring a vocoder and an acoustic sound, which various critics likened to her early discography.

"If You Let Me", a collaboration with Mumford, is the tenth song on Florescence. On working with him, Peters said they had an instant musical connection and that he is "an incredible musician, writer and player", describing it as "such a treat getting to work with him". "Flat Earther" sees Peters compare a former romance of hers to a Flat Earth conspiracist since it was stubborn and dumb. The song begins with minimal instrumentation before building up and it was suggested that it was to mirror her breaking out of the relationship. She co-wrote it with Jez Ashurst and Brad Ellis, one of whom suggested the concept of writing about Flat Earthers; Peters quickly developed a meaning that was more personal to her which was "unrequited love, the delusion and the hope for it".

"Girl's Just Flying", the thirteenth song, is about Peters being "healed and immune to the effects of her exes". She has admitted that her label were unimpressed with the song and wanted her to cut it from the track list, but she fought for it to make it onto the project. She explained to Billboard that it reminds her of them and that she could not wait to sing it live for them. Florescence closes with "Nothing Like Being in Love", another intentional track listing decision from Peters. It was described as a song about Peters being "free of resentment and safe in the knowledge she's pushed through the weeds to thrive".

== Critical reception ==
Professional ratings
Aggregate scores
Source	Rating
AnyDecentMusic?	TBA
Review scores
Source	Rating
NME	4/5 stars
Far Out Magazine	3.5/5 stars
The Arts Desk	3/5 stars

Writing for NME, Rhian Daly awarded Florescence four out of five stars. She praised the sonic shift Peters' music had undergone since The Good Witch and felt it made sense for Peters to deviate from the "sparkling, chugging pop" sound. However, she appreciated that she still had some of her "old bite here, despite her general mellowing". Daly opined that some of the songs could have been cut from the track listing since she felt an "occasional drift" throughout the record, but complimented hearing Peters' full journey to feeling true love. Daly appreciated the two collaborations on the album but felt that Peters could also stand alone musically.

Far Out's Lauren Hunter gave the album three and a half stars out of a possible five. Hunter also appreciated the shift in tone and despite some "clunky" lyrics, she found "slightly awkward moments" to be endearing and felt they represented the imperfect moments of womanhood. She listed "Houses" as her standout track. Her.ie stated that every woman in Ireland should listen to the album, describing it as a "soul album" with diaristic lyrics that felt personal and the opportunity to soundtrack women's lives. They billed "Mary Janes" as the highlight track, writing that it is "the anthem women need, especially in a world that is always telling them to make themselves smaller, to shrink 'to be worthy'". Thomas H. Green for The Arts Desk gave the album 3 of 5 stars, stating the album is an enjoyable listen that would fail the Bechdel-Wallace test.

== Track listing ==
Florescence track listing
No.	Title	Writer(s)	Producer(s)	Length
1.	"Mary Janes"	Maisie Peters; Joe Rubel	Peters; Rubel; Ian Fitchuk	2:30
2.	"Audrey Hepburn"	Peters; Rubel	Peters; Rubel; Fitchuk	3:06
3.	"Say My Name in Your Sleep"	Peters; Marcus Mumford	Peters; Fitchuk; Mumford	3:12
4.	"Old Fashioned"	Peters; Rubel	Peters; Rubel; Fitchuk	3:04
5.	"Houses"	Peters	Peters; Fitchuk	4:01
6.	"Kingmaker" (with Julia Michaels)	Peters; Chloe Kraemer; Julia Michaels	Peters; Michaels; Kraemer; Fitchuk^{[a]}	3:08
7.	"Vampire Time"	Peters; Ines Dunn; Matias Tellez	Peters; Fitchuk; Tellez	3:20
8.	"My Regards"	Peters; Fitchuk; Nick Lobel	Peters; Fitchuk; Lobel; Douglas Showalter^{[a]}	3:11
9.	"You You You"	Peters; Alysa Vanderheym	Peters; Fitchuk; Vanderheym	2:46
10.	"If You Let Me" (with Marcus Mumford)	Peters; Mumford	Peters; Fitchuk; Mumford	3:13
11.	"Flat Earther"	Peters; Jez Ashurst; Bradford Ellis	Peters; Ashurst; Ellis	3:34
12.	"Questions"	Peters; Griff Clawson; Michael Pollack	Peters; Clawson; Pollack	3:07
13.	"Girl's Just Flying"	Peters; Jon Green; Vanderheym	Peters; Green; Vanderheym	3:42
14.	"You Then Me Now"	Peters; Green; Natalie Hemby	Peters; Fitchuk; Green	3:30
15.	"Nothing Like Being in Love"	Peters; Mikky Ekko; Green	Peters; Fitchuk; Green	3:27
Total length:				48:51

Lilac Edition bonus tracks
No.	Title	Length
16.	"Charlotte's Web"	3:04
17.	"Carried Away"	3:04
Total length:		54:59

Golden Wattle bonus tracks
No.	Title	Length
16.	"The Drought" (live from Sydney)	4:10
Total length:		53:01

=== Note ===
- ^{^[a]} indicates an additional producer.

== Personnel ==
Credits are adapted from Tidal.

=== Musicians ===
- Maisie Peters – vocals (all tracks), piano (tracks 2, 4), vocoder (2, 9), backing vocals (2)
- Ian Fitchuk – bass (1–5, 7–9, 11, 13–15), piano (1–3, 11, 14), keyboards (2–6), drums (2–5, 7, 8, 10, 12–14), percussion (2–5, 7, 10–14), guitar (4, 5, 8, 13–15), backing vocals (4), programming (6, 9), electric guitar (7)
- Joe Rubel – guitar (1, 2, 4); keyboards, programming (1, 4); drum programming (2, 4), piano (2)
- Gretta Ray – backing vocals (1, 5)
- Todd Lombardo – guitar (2–4, 7, 9, 11–13), banjo (3, 11), mandolin (7)
- Peter Groenwald – backing vocals (2, 8)
- Marcus Mumford – vocals, guitar (3, 10); backing vocals (3)
- Chloe Kraemer – bass, drum programming, keyboards, programming, synthesizer (6)
- Julia Michaels – vocals (6)
- Matt Combs – violin, viola (7)
- Nick Lobel – drums, guitar, programming (8)
- Doug Showalter – keyboards (8)
- Alysa Vanderheym – guitar, programming (9)
- Michael Pollack – Clavichord, drum programming, glockenspiel, guitar, piano, synthesizer, synthesizer programming (12)
- Griff Clawson – drum programming, glockenspiel, guitar, piano, synthesizer, synthesizer programming (12)
- Janeva Burrill – backing vocals (13)
- Maria Christina Hizon – backing vocals (13)
- Phoebe Jasper – backing vocals (13)
- Jon Green – programming (13, 14), guitar (13); backing vocals, piano, strings, synthesizer (14, 15)
- Mikky Ekko – backing vocals (15)

=== Technical ===
- Konrad Snyder – engineering (all tracks), vocal engineering (1, 2, 4–9)
- Joe Rubel – engineering (1, 2)
- Robert Sellens – engineering (1)
- Brandon Bost – engineering (3, 10)
- Matt Wiggins – engineering (3)
- Chloe Kraemer – engineering (6)
- Jesse Broc – engineering (8)
- Alysa Vanderheym – engineering (9)
- Griff Clawson – engineering (12)
- Matias Tellez – vocal engineering (7)
- Nick Lobel – vocal engineering (8)
- Jon Castelli – mixing
- Brad Lauchert – mix engineering
- Dale Becker – mastering
- Adam Burt – mastering assistance
- Katie Harvey – mastering assistance
- Noah McCorkle – mastering assistance

== Charts ==
Chart performance for Florescence
Chart (2026)	Peak position
Australian Albums (ARIA)	1
Austrian Albums (Ö3 Austria)	12
Belgian Albums (Ultratop Flanders)	13
Belgian Albums (Ultratop Wallonia)	100
Canadian Albums (Billboard)	94
Dutch Albums (Album Top 100)	30
French Physical Albums (SNEP)	33
German Albums (Offizielle Top 100)	10
German Pop Albums (Offizielle Top 100)	5
Hungarian Physical Albums (MAHASZ)	6
Irish Albums (Official Charts)	10
New Zealand Albums (RMNZ)	9
Scottish Albums (Official Charts)	1
UK Albums (Official Charts)	1
US Billboard 200	131
US Top Album Sales (Billboard)	10
US Vinyl Sales (Billboard)	7
