= Amelia Dimoldenberg =

English comedian, writer, presenter and journalist (born 1994)

- Dimoldenberg in 2026
- Born: 30 January 1994 (age 32); London, England
- Education: St Marylebone School; Central Saint Martins (BA)
- Occupations: Comedian; presenter
- Years active: 2014–present

Comedy career
- Genres: Deadpan; cringe comedy

YouTube information
- Channel: Amelia Dimoldenberg
- Subscribers: 3.47 million
- Views: 1.18 billion
- Last updated: 17 November 2026

Amelia Dimoldenberg (/dɪˈmoʊldənbɜːrɡ/ dih-MOHL-dən-burg; born 30 January 1994) is an English comedian, writer, and presenter. She is the creator and host of the web series Chicken Shop Date (2014–present), in which she interviews celebrities in fried chicken restaurants while subjecting them to her sarcastic, deadpan, and awkward sense of humour.

In 2025, Dimoldenberg was named in Time magazine's inaugural "TIME100 Creators" list, which features the 100 most influential digital content creators.

== Early life and education ==
Amelia Dimoldenberg was born on 30 January 1994. She is the daughter of Paul Dimoldenberg, a former Labour Councillor and public relations executive, who served on Westminster City Council until his retirement in 2026, including as the Lord Mayor of Westminster in 2025-2026. She has a sister, Zoe Dimoldenberg, and her family are Jewish.

Dimoldenberg was raised in Marylebone, London, and attended St Marylebone School. She gained A-levels in English, art, politics, and IT, and later studied for a foundation diploma in Art and Design and a Bachelor of Arts (BA) in Fashion Communication at Central Saint Martins constituent college of the University of the Arts London. Graduating in 2017, Dimoldenberg received an honorary fellowship in 2024.

== Career ==
=== Chicken Shop Date ===
Chicken Shop Date began as a column written by Dimoldenberg for The Cut, a publication based at the Stowe Centre youth club on Harrow Road, London. It was other members' interest in grime music that led her to interview grime artists, as she wanted to know more about the music, and she began by interviewing "friends of friends". Dimoldenberg had the idea to frame the interviews as dates, and the location of a chicken shop was chosen as it was "somewhere you wouldn't usually go on a date". The first filmed episode was released in March 2014, featuring a "date" with grime MC Ghetts.

Each episode takes around 40 minutes to film, with the finished episode being edited down to around ten minutes. Dimoldenberg has described her persona in the show as "an exaggerated version" of herself, adding that "in the edit is where the character comes through, we chop and cut things, we make it more awkward". While noting that Chicken Shop Date is "not as popular" as American interview formats like Hot Ones, Between Two Ferns, and Carpool Karaoke, Jonah Engel Bromwich of The New York Times has described it as "notable for the way in which it has grown through tapping into a specific subculture" and that "capturing an audience of music enthusiasts has given the show credibility". In September 2026, she announced the series will be coming to an end.

=== Television ===
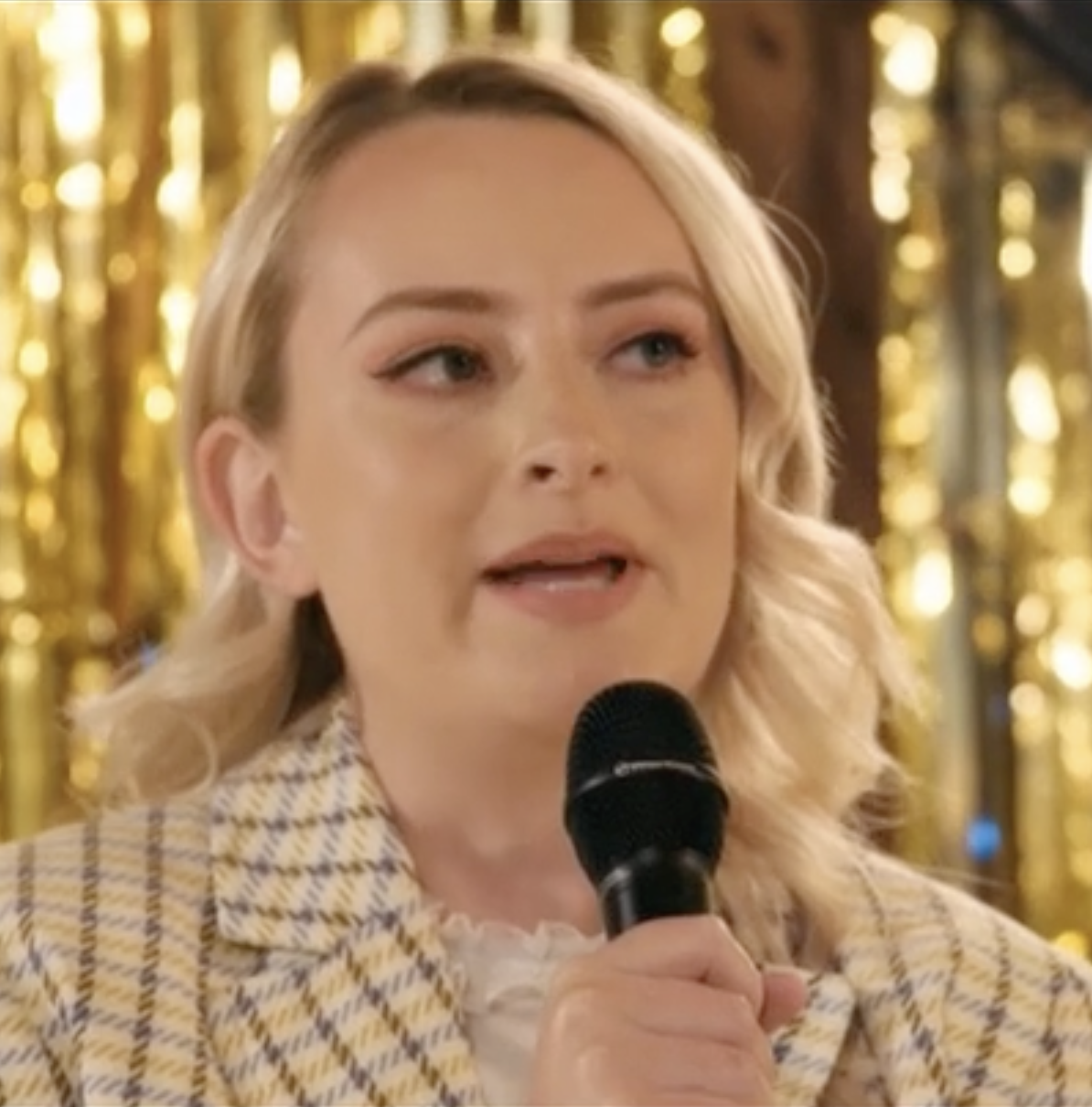
Amelia Dimoldenberg in 2019

In early 2018, Dimoldenberg presented the Channel 4 documentary Meet the Markles, in which she travelled to the United States to meet members of Meghan Markle's family. The Telegraph called it "an entertaining ride [...] slicked by moments of real hilarity" and the Evening Standard described it as an "instant hit". Later that year, she appeared in an episode of The Big Narstie Show. In October, she appeared as a "roving reporter" in the first series of the ITV2 hip hop-themed comedy show Don't Hate the Playaz. The series was nominated for a Royal Television Society Award. Dimoldenberg did not appear in the second series.

In 2020, Dimoldenberg appeared on Channel 4's Celebrity Come Dine with Me with Marcel Somerville, Dave Benson Phillips, Anthea Turner, and AJ Odudu.

In December 2021, it was announced that Dimoldenberg would host a web shorts series titled Celebrity Rebrand for Channel 4. The first season, consisting of six episodes, was released via the network's social media channels. The comedy show features Dimoldenberg as a "celebrity brand visionary" attempting to assist various Channel 4 stars in rebranding their image.

In January 2023, she appeared on a "New Year's Treat" episode of Taskmaster alongside Self Esteem, Mo Farah, Greg James, and Carol Vorderman. In 2025, she participated in series 8 of The Great Stand Up to Cancer Bake Off.

On 26 January 2026, the Academy of Motion Picture Arts and Sciences announced that Dimoldenberg would return as the Social Media Ambassador and Red Carpet Correspondent for the 98th Academy Awards. This marked her third consecutive year in the role.

On 3 September 2026, Dimoldenberg announced that Chicken Shop Date would no longer be produced, with the reason being that other projects demanded more of her time.

=== Other ventures ===
In the ten years since launching Chicken Shop Date, Dimoldenberg has worked to broaden her comedic repertoire. In 2025, it was reported that most of her income came from sources other than the show. She has reported on several red carpets, starting with the MOBO Awards in 2017, followed by the Brit Awards, Golden Globe Awards, and the premiere of the film Barbie (2023). She writes hundreds of questions before each event to ensure she is prepared. She established a production company in 2018 called Dimz Inc Ltd (known as Chicken Shop Date Limited from 2018–2021), which houses shows like Chicken Shop Date, Amelia's Cooking Show, and Fake News. Dimoldenberg plans to launch Dimz Inc Academy alongside an in-person exhibition for visitors to "be inspired and create their own ideas", inspired by Chicken Shop Date's youth club origins.

In 2022, Dimoldenberg became a brand ambassador for Olay. She is also an ambassador for Bumble and Levi's. On 29 January 2024, the Academy of Motion Picture Arts and Sciences announced Dimoldenberg as their red carpet correspondent for the 96th Academy Awards, a role she repeated in 2025 and in 2026. Dimoldenberg directed an album trailer for Maisie Peters' Florescence (2026), starring Peters and Georgia Groome. The trailer made reference to the 2006 cult classic film Angus, Thongs and Perfect Snogging. In 2026, Dimoldenberg had a brief cameo as herself in the film The Devil Wears Prada 2. Later that year, Dimoldenberg partnered with M&S, appearing as the face of their Love That summer range.
