= Gingerbread Man Records =

Record label in the United Kingdom

- Parent company: Warner Music Group
- Founded: August 8, 2015; 11 years ago
- Founder: Ed Sheeran
- Status: Active
- Distributor: Atlantic Music Group
- Genre: Various
- Country of origin: United Kingdom

Gingerbread Man Records is a British vanity label, founded by English singer-songwriter Ed Sheeran under a deal with Warner Music Group.

== History ==
In March 2015, Sheeran revealed his plans to establish Gingerbread Man Records through a deal with Warner Music Group. Sheeran said he wanted to start a record label as a way to help new artists who haven't found the right platform to reach a wider audience. The label, as well as a dedicated YouTube channel, launched three months later. The label's first release was 5, which was a compilation of five EPs that Sheeran independently released before his debut album.

The label's first signee was Jamie Lawson, whom Sheeran had previously met while playing in London's folk circuit. On 9 October 2015, Gingerbread Man Records released Lawson self-titled fourth album, which achieved a number one position on the UK Albums Chart. He also signed Foy Vance that same year. The label signed Maisie Peters in 2021. As of 2023, Ed Sheeran himself is signed to the label, with Autumn Variations being his first studio album on the label.

== Signed artists ==
- Ed Sheeran (2015–2026)
- Jamie Lawson (2015–2019)
- Foy Vance (2015–2023)
- Maisie Peters (2021–present)

== Discography ==
=== Albums ===
- Ed Sheeran – 5 (2015)
- Jamie Lawson – Jamie Lawson (2015)
- Foy Vance – The Wild Swan (2016)
- Jamie Lawson – Happy Accidents (2017)
- Foy Vance – Live in London (2017)
- Jamie Lawson – The Years in Between (2019)
- Foy Vance – From Muscle Shoals (2019)
- Foy Vance – To Memphis (2019)
- Foy Vance – Hope in the Highlands: Recorded Live from Dunvarlich (2020)
- Maisie Peters – You Signed Up for This (2021)
- Foy Vance – Signs of Life (2021)
- Maisie Peters – The Good Witch (2023)
- Ed Sheeran – Autumn Variations (2023)
- Ed Sheeran – Play (2025)
- Maisie Peters – Florescence (2026)

=== Singles ===
This is a list of singles not from any album listed

- Maisie Peters – "Place We Were Made" (2017)
- Maisie Peters – "Birthday" (2017)
- Jamie Lawson – "Footprints in the Snow" (2017)
- Maisie Peters – "Worst of You" (2018)
- Maisie Peters – "Best I'll Ever Sing" (2018)
- Jamie Lawson – "Testify" (2018)
- Maisie Peters – "Stay Young" (2019)
- Maisie Peters – ""Favourite Ex"" (2019)
- Maisie Peters – "Daydreams" (2020)
- Maisie Peters – "The List" (2020)
- Maisie Peters – "Sad Girl Summer" (2020)
- Maisie Peters – "Maybe Don't" (2020)
- Maisie Peters – "Cate's Brother" (2022)
- Maisie Peters – "Blonde" (2022)
- Maisie Peters – "Good Enough" (2022)
- Maisie Peters – "Not Another Rockstar" (2022)
- Ed Sheeran – "Under the Tree" (2024)
