= The Good Witch (album) =

2023 studio album by Maisie Peters

Studio album by Maisie Peters
- Released: 23 June 2023
- Recorded: 2022
- Genres: Dance-pop; pop rock
- Length: 47:09
- Labels: Gingerbread Man; Asylum
- Producers: Joe Rubel; Elvira Anderfjärd; Oscar Görres; Matias Téllez; Afterhrs; Ben Ash; Brad Ellis; Jez Ashurst; The Nocturns

Maisie Peters chronology
You Signed Up for This (2021)	The Good Witch (2023)	Florescence (2026)

Singles from The Good Witch
- 1. "Body Better" Released: 27 January 2023; 2. "Lost the Breakup" Released: 31 March 2023; 3. "Two Weeks Ago" Released: 26 May 2023; 4. "Run" Released: 23 June 2023; 5. "There It Goes" Released: 29 September 2023

The Good Witch is the second studio album by English singer-songwriter Maisie Peters. It was released on 23 June 2023 by Gingerbread Man Records and Asylum Records.

Peters took inspiration from Greek mythology whilst making the record and has described it as her "twisted version" of a break-up album. She wrote the album over the duration of a year whilst touring and has said that the chronological track listing is a reflection of her career highs and personal lows.

== Background ==
"This is my heart and soul, my blood on the page, the collection of stories that I've managed to capture in the past year. A true chronicle of my life in recent history. [...] It ducks and weaves between the real and surreal, and centres my own universe, of which I am of course the keeper of the keys and the holder of the cards – the good witch, if you will. It goes from light to dark in the flip of a switch and I hope takes you on a journey whereby the end you feel like you've gotten lost in someone else's planet for a bit."

— Peters reflecting on creating The Good Witch, upon the album's announcement

Peters was hopeful that people would notice the maturity developed in her songwriting between The Good Witch and her debut album, You Signed Up for This (2021).

Peters was inspired by her earlier folk and singer-songwriter style of music during the production of the album. She was also inspired by the Greek mythology written from female perspectives. She said that the project acts as her "twisted version" of a break-up album with a loosely chronological track listing, with the songs exploring Peters "searching for balance between career highs and personal lows". When asked on why she chose the name The Good Witch, Peters responded: "when I was thinking about the themes within this album, which felt like there was a lot of words that also felt synonymous with good witch, I sort of like the power within the good witch and femininity, danger, it feels sort of threatening. It feels like an interesting way to describe one's self, especially as a young woman. I like the destruction it suggest and the power it gives." She hoped that the album would sit with listeners for a long time after its release, in the same way she felt Lorde's 2017 album Melodrama had done. Peters said that The Good Witch was not sonically similar to Melodrama, but hoped that she could replicate some of its cultural importance.

== Promotion and release ==
Leading up to the album's release, Peters posted various tarot cards on her social media pages, each representing a track on the album. She explained that she wanted listeners to understand the meanings behind the songs, as well as see into the process of making them. Originally announced to be released on 16 June 2023, the release date was later pushed back a week, to 23 June 2023, with Peters apologising for the delay and joking that the album would work better as a Cancer.

Peters released a deluxe edition of The Good Witch, featuring six new songs which she stated "slipped through the cracks", on 27 October 2023.

=== Singles ===
The first single of the album, "Body Better", was released in January 2023, prior to the announcement of the album on 15 February 2023. The second single, "Lost the Breakup" was released on 4 April 2023 to further promote the album. The third single, "Two Weeks Ago" a folk-pop ballad featuring backing vocals from friend Gretta Ray, was released on 26 May 2023. "Run" was released as the fourth single, alongside the album, on 23 June.

=== Tours ===
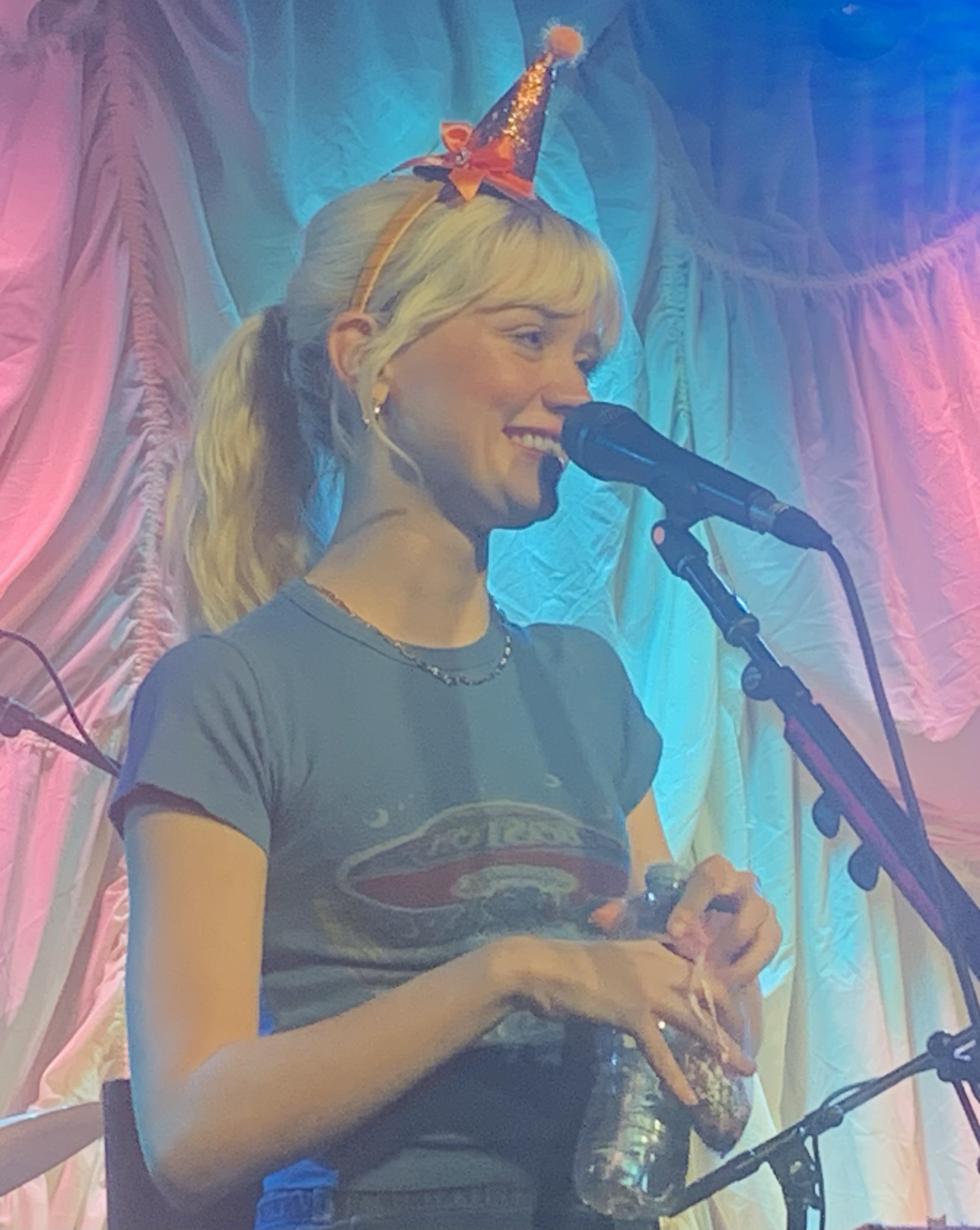
Peters performing on An Evening with the Good Witch tour.

On the day of the "Two Weeks Ago" release, Peters announced an acoustic tour to promote the album called An Evening with the Good Witch, visiting various small venues across the UK throughout June 2023. On the day of the album's release, she performed on the Pyramid Stage at Glastonbury Festival. Peters is set to tour the United States and Canada, headlining her own shows in addition to supporting Ed Sheeran, in the summer of 2023, before returning to the UK and Ireland for a series of shows in October and November, ending with her first headline performance in Wembley Arena. In March 2024, she will perform three shows in Australia.

== Critical reception ==
Professional ratings
Aggregate scores
Source	Rating
AnyDecentMusic?	7.2/10
Metacritic	76/100
Review scores
Source	Rating
The Arts Desk	4/5 stars
DIY	4/5 stars
Evening Standard	3/5 stars
The Independent	4/5 stars
The Line of Best Fit	7/10
MusicOMH	3/5 stars
The Telegraph	3/5 stars

On Metacritic, which assigns a normalised score out of 100 to ratings from publications, the album received a mean score of 76 based on 7 reviews, indicating "generally favorable reviews".

James Hall of The Daily Telegraph described the album as "smart, relatable break-up music for Gen Z listeners", and identified the influence of Taylor Swift on Peters' music, stating that the "similarities [with Swift's music] are obvious from the start". In positive reviews, The Arts Desk's Cheri Amour wrote that The Good Witch positions Peters "right up there with the genius pop makers", and DIY's Sarah Jamieson described it as "even more cohesive and polished" than her debut album.

== Commercial performance ==
The Good Witch debuted at number one on the UK Albums Chart, shifting 20,760 units in its first week and becoming Peters' first chart-topping album in the country. Selling 7,000 equivalent album units in the United States in its first week according to Luminate, The Good Witch became Peters' first-ever album to chart on Billboard Heatseekers Albums and Billboard Top Album Sales.

== Track listing ==
The Good Witch – Standard edition
No.	Title	Writer(s)	Producer(s)	Length
1.	"The Good Witch"	Maisie Peters; Joe Rubel	Rubel	2:37
2.	"Coming of Age"	Peters; Tove Burman; Elvira Anderfjärd	Anderfjärd	2:40
3.	"Watch"	Peters; Oscar Görres	Görres	3:13
4.	"Body Better"	Peters; Matias Tellez; Ines Dunn	Tellez	3:09
5.	"Want You Back"	Peters; Rubel	Rubel	3:24
6.	"The Band and I"	Peters; Andrew Haas; Ian Franzino; Dunn	Afterhrs	3:55
7.	"You're Just a Boy (and I'm Kinda the Man)"	Peters; Tellez	Tellez	3:05
8.	"Lost the Breakup"	Peters; Görres	Görres	3:09
9.	"Wendy"	Peters; Brad Ellis; Jez Ashurst; Rubel	Rubel	3:18
10.	"Run"	Peters; Ben Ash; Dunn	Two Inch Punch	2:49
11.	"Two Weeks Ago"	Peters; Ellis; Ashurst	Ellis; Ashurst	2:59
12.	"BSC"	Peters; Ellis; Ashurst; Rubel	Rubel	2:41
13.	"Therapy"	Peters; Charlie Martin; Dunn; Joe Housley	The Nocturns	2:57
14.	"There It Goes"	Peters; Tellez; Miranda Cooper	Tellez	3:45
15.	"History of Man"	Peters; Rubel	Rubel	3:28
Total length:				47:17

Japanese CD edition bonus track
No.	Title	Writer(s)	Producer(s)	Length
16.	"Body Better" (Acoustic)	Peters; Tellez; Ines Dunn	Tellez	3:16
Total length:				50:37

The Good Witch – Deluxe edition
No.	Title	Writer(s)	Producer(s)	Length
16.	"Holy Revival"	Peters; Anderfjärd	Anderfjärd	2:54
17.	"Yoko"	Peters; Jon Green	Green	4:14
18.	"The Song"	Peters; Tellez	Tellez	2:25
19.	"Guy On a Horse"	Peters; Anderfjärd; Burman	Anderfjärd	2:25
20.	"Truth Is"	Peters; Dunn; Tellez	Tellez	3:17
21.	"The Last One"	Peters; Henrik Michelsen; Cooper	Michelsen	3:59
Total length:				66:31

== Personnel ==
Musicians

- Maisie Peters – vocals (all tracks), backing vocals (tracks 1–3, 5, 8, 9, 12, 15), drums (9), guitar (12)
- Joe Rubel – drum programming (1, 5, 6, 9, 12, 15), keyboards (1, 9, 12, 15), backing vocals (1), bass guitar (5, 12), piano (5), guitar (9, 12, 15), programming (9)
- Jack Geary – drums (1, 4–7, 12, 14), cymbals (1, 5, 6, 12, 14), backing vocals (1)
- Gretta Ray – backing vocals (1, 4, 11, 15)
- Jamie McEvoy – programming (1, 5, 12, 15)
- Christina (Tina) Hizon – piano (1, 6, 12, 15), keyboards (1, 12, 15), violin (1, 15), backing vocals (1, 12)
- Jessica Scott – backing vocals (1)
- Abigail Latip – backing vocals (1)
- Caitlin (Cate) Canning – backing vocals (1)
- Dominique Froud – backing vocals (1)
- Hannah Layton Joyce – backing vocals (1)
- Ines Dunn – backing vocals (1)
- Stuart Quinnell – backing vocals (1)
- Vera Heim – backing vocals (1)
- Charlie Havens – cymbals, drums (1)
- Ella Renton – flute (1)
- Bobby Havens – percussion (1)
- Elvira Anderfjärd – backing vocals, bass guitar, drums, guitar, keyboards, programming (2)
- Oscar Görres – backing vocals, bass guitar, drums, guitar, keyboards, programming (3, 8)
- Matias Téllez – bass guitar, drums, percussion, programming, synthesizer (4, 7, 14); programming (4, 7, 14), piano (4, 14), cello (4), guitar (7, 14), backing vocals (14)
- Joel Peat – pedal steel guitar (4, 7), guitar (6, 15)
- Ed Sheeran – backing vocals (5)
- Matt Glasbey – programming (5)
- Afterhrs – bass guitar, guitar, programming (6)
- Two Inch Punch – bass guitar, drums, guitar, keyboard, synthesizer (10)
- Jez Ashurst – acoustic guitar, banjo, piano, programming (10); guitar, keyboards (12)
- Robert Ash – guitar (10)
- Rachael Lander – cello (11)
- Andy Marshall – double bass (11)
- Brad Ellis – drums, keyboards, programming (11)
- Kirsty Mangan – string arrangement, violin (11)
- Gary Pomeroy – viola (11)
- Matthew Ward – violin (11)
- Charlie Martin – drums, guitar, keyboards, programming (13)
- Joe Housley – guitar (13)

Technical

- Stuart Hawkes – mastering
- Mark "Spike" Stent – mixing
- Joe Rubel – engineering (1, 5, 9, 12, 15)
- Jamie McEvoy – engineering (1, 5, 6, 9, 12, 15)
- Robert Sellens – engineering (1, 5, 9, 12, 15)
- Mattias Téllez – engineering (4, 7)
- Matt Glasbey – engineering (5, 11), drum engineering (7)
- Jeff Gunnell – engineering (6)
- Two Inch Punch – engineering (10)
- Charlie Martin – engineering (13)
- Joe Housley – engineering (13)
- Gab Strum – engineering (15)
- Marcus Locock – drum engineering (14)
- Matt Wolach – mixing assistance
- Tris Ellis – engineering assistance (1, 5, 6, 9, 12, 15)
- Jamie Sprosen – engineering assistance (14)

== Charts ==
Chart performance for The Good Witch
Chart (2023–2024)	Peak position
Australian Albums (ARIA)	4
Belgian Albums (Ultratop Flanders)	127
Croatian International Albums (HDU)	22
Dutch Albums (Album Top 100)	90
German Albums (Offizielle Top 100)	18
Hungarian Physical Albums (MAHASZ)	40
Irish Albums (IRMA)	7
New Zealand Albums (RMNZ)	9
Scottish Albums (Official Charts)	1
UK Albums (Official Charts)	1
US Heatseekers Albums (Billboard)	4
US Top Album Sales (Billboard)	35

== Certifications ==
Region	Certification	Certified units/sales
United Kingdom (BPI)	Silver	60,000^{‡}
^{‡} Sales+streaming figures based on certification alone.

== Release history ==
Release history and formats for The Good Witch
Region	Date	Format(s)	Edition(s)	Label	Ref.
Various	23 June 2023	Cassette; CD; box set; LP; streaming	Standard	Gingerbread Man; Asylum	
Various	23 June 2023	LP	Alternative Cover	Gingerbread Man; Asylum	
United Kingdom	23 June 2023	Cassette; CD; box set; LP	Armageddon Orange	Gingerbread Man; Asylum	
