= You Signed Up for This =

Studio album by Maisie Peters
- Released: 27 August 2021
- Length: 46:01
- Label: Gingerbread Man
- Producer: Joe Rubel; Bradford Ellis; Jez Ashurst; Henrik Michelson; Steve Mac; Afterhrs; Fred Again; Rob Milton; Frances

Maisie Peters chronology
| Trying: Season 2 (2021) | You Signed Up for This (2021) | The Good Witch (2023) |

Singles from You Signed Up for This
- 1. "John Hughes Movie" Released: 26 February 2021; 2. "Psycho" Released: 2 July 2021; 3. "You Signed Up for This / Brooklyn" Released: 11 August 2021; 4. "Volcano" Released: 18 August 2021

You Signed Up for This is the debut studio album by British singer-songwriter Maisie Peters, released on 27 August 2021 through Ed Sheeran's Gingerbread Man Records.

== Background ==
Peters started her music career when she began uploading her own original songs to YouTube in 2015. Before the release of her first studio album, Peters previously released the extended plays Dressed Too Nice for a Jacket (2018) and It's Your Bed Babe, It's Your Funeral (2019) with Atlantic Records UK. Work on the album began in summer 2020 when Peters went away to live in a cottage where she began writing. "Psycho" was the final song to be finished from the album.

The announcement of the album came alongside the news that Peters had signed to Ed Sheeran's label Gingerbread Man Records on 15 June 2021. In a statement, Peters said that "signing to Gingerbread is a dream come true" after she "grew up inspired and in awe of Ed".

== Singles and promotion ==
"John Hughes Movie" was released as the lead single on 26 February 2021. Peters said that she took inspiration for the track from the John Hughes films that "encapsulate that foolish romantic energy of high school and everything that I, a small town English wannabe Molly Ringwald wanted to be, but was not." Peters cited Pretty in Pink and Sixteen Candles as the primary Hughes films from which she took inspiration. The second single "Psycho" was released on 2 July 2021. "Psycho" is one of three songs that Peters co-wrote with Ed Sheeran. On 11 August 2021, "You Signed Up for This" and "Brooklyn" were released as a double A-side single.

== Critical reception ==
Professional ratings
Aggregate scores
| Source | Rating |
|---|---|
| AnyDecentMusic? | 6.9/10 |
| Metacritic | 84/100 |
Review scores
| Source | Rating |
| Clash | 8/10 |
| DIY | 3.5/5 stars |
| Dork | 4/5 stars |
| Gigwise | 6/10 stars |
| The Independent | 4/5 stars |
| The Irish Times | 2/5 stars |
| The Line of Best Fit | 8/10 |
| PopMatters | 8/10 |

At Metacritic, which assigns a normalized rating out of 100 to reviews from professional publications, You Signed Up for This received an average score of 84 based on 6 reviews, indicating "universal acclaim". Aggregator AnyDecentMusic? gave it 6.9 out of 10, based on their assessment of the critical consensus.

== Track listing ==
You Signed Up for This track listing
| No. | Title | Writer(s) | Producer(s) | Length |
|---|---|---|---|---|
| 1. | "You Signed Up for This" | Maisie Peters; Joe Rubel | Rubel | 3:15 |
| 2. | "I'm Trying (Not Friends)" | Peters; Rubel | Rubel; Jim-E Stack^{[a]} | 2:43 |
| 3. | "John Hughes Movie" | Peters; Miranda Cooper; Henrik Michelson | Michelsen ^{[m]}; Afterhrs | 3:36 |
| 4. | "Outdoor Pool" | Peters; Rubel; Jon Green | Rubel | 3:16 |
| 5. | "Love Him I Don't" | Peters; Rubel; Green | Rubel | 3:15 |
| 6. | "Psycho" | Peters; Edward Sheeran; Steve McCutcheon | Steve Mac | 3:04 |
| 7. | "Boy" | Peters; Sheeran; Rubel | Rubel; Afterhrs | 2:58 |
| 8. | "Hollow" | Peters; Sheeran; John Mcdaid; Rubel | Rubel | 3:37 |
| 9. | "Villain" | Peters; Rob Milton | Milton | 3:45 |
| 10. | "Brooklyn" | Peters; Sophie Cooke | Frances | 3:03 |
| 11. | "Elvis Song" | Peters; Cooper; Frederick Gibson; Wayne Thompson; Mark James; Johnny Christopher | Fred Again; Congee^{[a]}; Siba^{[c]} | 3:10 |
| 12. | "Talking to Strangers" | Peters; Bradford Ellis; Jez Ashurst | Ellis; Ashurst | 3:10 |
| 13. | "Volcano" | Peters; Ellis; Ashurst | Ellis; Ashurst | 3:28 |
| 14. | "Tough Act" | Peters; Cooke; Rubel | Rubel | 3:37 |
| Total length: | | | | 45:57 |

Japanese edition bonus tracks
| No. | Title | Writer(s) | Producer(s) | Length |
|---|---|---|---|---|
| 15. | "Worst of You" | Peters; Gibson | Fred Again | 3:18 |
| 16. | "Favourite Ex" | Peters; Ellis; Ashurst | Ellis | 3:22 |
| 17. | "Feels Like This" | Peters; Ellis; Louis Mattrs; Alex Montague; Negin Djafari | Ellis | 3:45 |
| Total length: | | | | 56:33 |

=== Notes ===
- "Elvis Song" contains elements from "Always on My Mind", written by Wayne Thompson, Mark James, Johnny Christopher, which was covered by Elvis Presley in 1972.
- ^{^[m]} indicates a main and vocal producer
- ^{^[a]} signifies an additional producer
- ^{^[c]} indicates a co-producer

== Personnel ==
Musicians

- Maisie Peters – vocals
- Henrik Michaelsen – guitar, bass, drums, backup vocals
- Andrew Haas – guitar, bass, drums, synthesiser, backup vocals
- Ian Franzino – drums

Production

- Stuart Hawkes – mastering engineer
- Mark Stent – mixing engineer
- Henrik Michaelsen – engineer
- Ian Franzino – engineer

== Charts ==
Chart performance for You Signed Up for This
| Chart (2021) | Peak position |
|---|---|
| Irish Albums (OCC) | 20 |
| Scottish Albums (OCC) | 2 |
| UK Albums (OCC) | 2 |

== Release history ==
Release history for You Signed Up for This
| Region | Date | Format | Label | Ref. |
|---|---|---|---|---|
| Various | 27 August 2021 | CD; LP; cassette; digital download; streaming | Atlantic | |
