= Rochester Regional Health =

Integrated health system in Rochester, New York

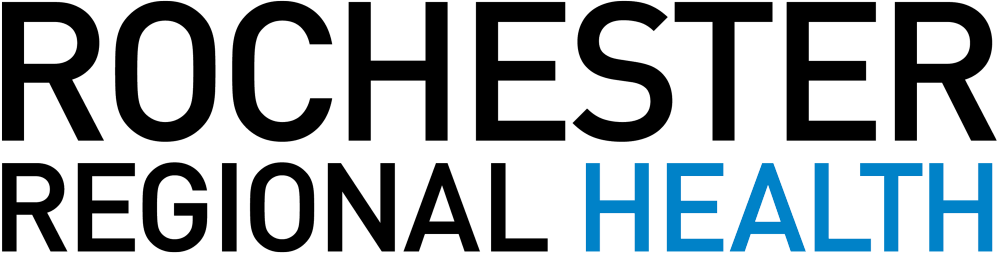

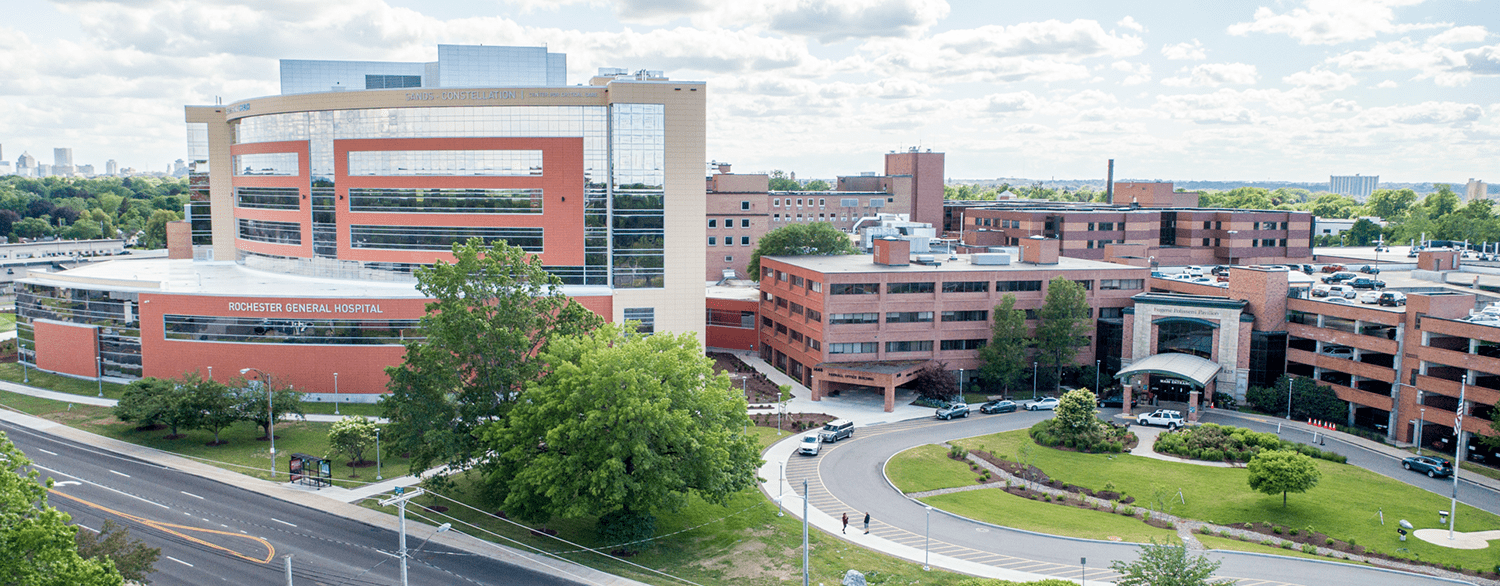
- Abbreviation: RRH
- Nickname: Rochester Regional
- Predecessor: Rochester General Health System; Unity Health System
- Formation: 2014 (Result of Merger)
- Founded at: Rochester, NY
- Type: Nonprofit Organization
- Tax ID no.: 22-2551509
- Headquarters: Rochester, NY
- Location(s): 100 Kings Highway South; Rochester, New York 14617
- Coordinates: 43.201909°N 77.5778437°W
- Region served: Greater Rochester, Finger Lakes Region, St. Lawrence County
- Services: Healthcare
- CEO: Richard "Chip" Davis, Ph.D.
- COO: Jennifer Eslinger
- Subsidiaries: InterVol, GRIPA, ElderOne, ACM Medical Laboratories, St. Lawrence Health System
- Affiliations: Roswell Park Comprehensive Cancer Center, and Rochester Institute of Technology
- Revenue: ▲$3.2B Billion USD (2022)
- Staff: 19,400+ Employees (2023)
- Volunteers: 734+ (2023)
- Students: 132 (2023)
- Website: www.rochesterregional.org
- Remarks: #1 - Hospital in Rochester, NY (2022) #120 - America's Best Employers (2015)
- Formerly called: Rochester Regional Health System (Removed "System" in May of 2015)

Rochester Regional Health in Rochester, New York is an integrated health system that was formed in 2014 by the joining of Rochester General and Unity Health systems, and acquiring of St. Lawrence Health System in 2021.

The network includes 9 hospitals, ElderONE/PACE (Program for All-Inclusive Care for the Elderly) and home health programs, a college of health careers, outpatient laboratories, rehabilitation programs and surgical centers, independent and assisted living centers and skilled nursing facilities. They serve families in communities from the Greater Rochester area across Western New York, Finger Lakes region, and the St. Lawrence region of Northern NY. Rochester Regional also operates a global clinical trials and testing subsidiary, ACM Global Laboratories, that operates in 65 countries.

Rochester Regional Health is Rochester's second-largest employer, and the largest employer in St. Lawrence County. The system has 19,400 employees, which includes 2,100 medical providers, 3,900 nurses, and over 730 volunteers. Rochester General Hospital, the flagship hospital for the health system is ranked as the 11th busiest emergency room in the nation and 3rd in New York State.

== History ==
In February 2003, Rochester General Health System (then called ViaHealth) and Unity Health System opened merger discussions, but the discussions ended in April 2004, when Rochester General's board of directors voted unanimously to reject the merger. The disagreement was partly due to the differences in ViaHealth wanting to merge its medical and dental staff, and Unity Health System the opposite. Merger discussions began again in April 2013, in response to incentives built by the Federal Affordable Care Act, but also New York State regulations and increasing pressure for better outcomes and lower costs from business and commercial insurers.

In July 2014, Rochester General Health System and Unity Health System merged. The new system was referred to as "RU system" or "Newco" for a short time until the new board of directors selected the name Rochester Regional Health System.

In January 2015, United Memorial Medical Center joined the system. Clifton Springs Hospital & Clinic joined the system in April 2015. The hospitals joined due to the difficulty for small-town rural health clinics to be financially viable and to attract and retain adequate medical staff.

In May 2015, the system shortened its name to Rochester Regional Health, after realizing that the original logo and name were difficult to read and wasn't reflective of their overall brand.

In October 2020, Rochester Regional Health opened the Sands-Constellation Center for Critical Care on the Rochester General Hospital campus. The new 312,000 square foot facility was built to help deliver better care to an aging population in the region, as well as future generations to come. The new facility includes a new surgical care center with operating rooms, women's health and a newborn care suites, and 108 acuity-adaptable private patient rooms. Due to the facilities design, it allowed Rochester Regional to better manage the COVID-19 pandemic fall and winter surges and influx of patients needing critical care.

In January 2021, Rochester Regional Health acquired St. Lawrence Health System, a three-hospital system in Potsdam, N.Y. The affiliation aims to strengthen the care that is delivered in the North Country communities served by St. Lawrence Health System.

As a result of the COVID-19 pandemic impact on labor shortages and inflation, the nurses at Rochester General Hospital voted to unionize in July 2022, hoping for better pay, staffing, and consistent retention.

== Hospitals & Facilities ==
Rochester Regional Health operates 9 hospitals across Western New York and Northern New York, and over 500 ambulatory facilities across these regions.

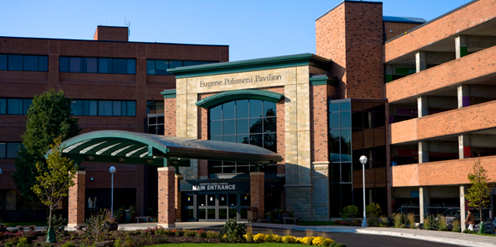
Rochester General Hospital, Rochester NY

=== Rochester General Hospital ===
- Rochester General Hospital, a 528-bed acute-care facility with a medical and dental staff of 1,500 that provides services including emergency, pediatrics, obstetrics and gynecology, neurology. The hospital was ranked #11th busiest Emergency Rooms in the United States in 2017 by Becker Health System Review.
- In 2022, nurses at Rochester General Hospital finalized a vote to formalize a union. A two-day election administered by the National Labor Relations Board, Registered nurses at Rochester General Hospital voted in favor (431-295) to form an independent union, called the Rochester Union of Nurses and Allied Professionals (RUNAP).

=== Unity Hospital ===
Unity Hospital, is a 337-bed community hospital in the town of Greece, NY. It is the only hospital in Monroe County to include free parking and all private patient rooms.

=== Unity Specialty Hospital ===
An acute care hospital delivering care for medically complex patients including on-site social work, physical therapy, nutrition, wound care, psychiatry and other specialty services.

=== Newark-Wayne Community Hospital ===
Newark Wayne Community Hospital, a 120-bed hospital in Wayne County Newark-Wayne Community Hospital was the first of its kind in New York to offer a telemedicine program to connect with its patients.

=== Clifton Springs Hospital and Clinic ===
Clifton Springs Hospital & Clinic, The 262-bed Clifton Springs Hospital & Clinic provides acute care, primary care, cancer treatment and behavioral health and addiction recovery programs in the central Finger Lakes region. The hospital features private rooms for every patient. An integrative program, the Springs of Clifton, delivers conventional care as well as complementary medicine therapies including massage, acupuncture, naturopathic medicine, chiropractic services, mineral baths and an herbal medicinary.

=== United Memorial Medical Center ===
United Memorial Medical Center, United Memorial Medical Center is a 131-bed hospital in Batavia serving residents of Genesee County and the surrounding rural communities. UMMC joined the Rochester Regional Health family of hospitals in late 2016, but still kept its original name, and manages its own board of directors.

=== Canton-Potsdam Hospital ===
Canton-Potsdam Hospital is a 94-bed hospital located in Potsdam, New York, which is northeast of Canton the county seat of St. Lawrence. Their special services programs include inpatient detox and Center for Cancer Care.

=== Massena Hospital ===
Massena Hospital is a 25-bed hospital located in Massena, New York providing medical, surgical, emergency and pediatric care.

=== Gouverneur Hospital ===
Gouverneur Hospital, Previously named E.J. Noble Hospital after Edward John Noble, is a 25-bed hospital located in Gouverneur, New York. Providing inpatient detox, substance use and disorder rehabilitation, emergency care, imaging, physical therapy and respiratory therapy.

== ACM Global Laboratories ==
Originally started in 1975, ACM Global Laboratories (formerly ACM Medical Laboratories) was an affiliate of Unity Health System, and was acquired with the merging of both Rochester General and Unity Health Systems. ACM Medical Laboratories provided both ambulatory and outpatient lab services for physicians and other health care providers, hospitals, employers and patients.

Now a wholly owned affiliate of Rochester Regional Health, ACM changed its name from ACM Medical Laboratories to ACM Global Laboratories to reflect its global footprint as a provider in medical diagnostic and clinical trial testing services. They operate in over 65 countries, with facilities in Rochester, NY, England, China, India, and Singapore. They still provide all patient lab services in Rochester, NY under the name Rochester Regional Health Laboratories, but a majority of their operations are business-to-business.

ACM specializes in Pathology Services, Anatomic Pathology, Micro and Molecular Diagnostics, Digital Pathology, Drug Testing Services, Microbiology, Pain and Addiction Management Services, as well as Flow Cytometry.

In June 2018, ACM Global Laboratories acquired ABS Laboratories, a bioanalytical testing facility located in London, United Kingdom.

== St. Lawrence Health System ==
St. Lawrence Health System began in 2013 as "a new two-hospital system." It subsequently expanded by adding Massena Memorial Hospital in 2019.

In 2019, as they were beginning their Massena takeover, they obtained funding for "patient-centered" training and grants "providing low-income St. Lawrence County residents free rides to non-medical destinations like pharmacies, grocery stores, farmer’s markets, self-help classes and other places that could improve their health."

Their special services programs include inpatient detox/rehab and Center for Cancer Care.

In January 2021, Rochester Regional Health acquired St. Lawrence Health System, a three-hospital system. The affiliation aims to strengthen the care that is delivered in the North Country communities served by St. Lawrence Health System.

In 2024, Rochester Regional Health started to phase out the St. Lawrence Health branding, and replacing it with Rochester Regional Health branding for locations and facilities in the St. Lawrence region to further emphasize the unification and integration of the two health systems, as well as Rochester Regional Health's commitment to the northern region of New York.

== Sustainability ==
On October 20, 2017, Rochester Regional Health announced one of the most aggressive healthcare sustainability project in the United States. By 2025 the health system wants to source 100% of their electrical power from renewable means. In order to achieve this goal, the health system will reduce electricity use through updating facility equipment, increase on and off-site generation of renewable energy by adding things like solar panels, and commit to only purchasing renewable electricity when they need to purchase electricity.

By the end of 2025 the company anticipates it will spend $1.5 Million less in electricity needs throughout the entire health system than it does today.

Rochester Regional Health also has aggressive plans to spearhead sustainability in healthcare that include energy efficiency, waste management, sustainable purchasing, building design, food sourcing, and community outreach and education. Practice Greenhealth said Rochester Regional Health's announcement of this initiative is the most ambitious sustainability commitment shared publicly by any health system is New York State, and is matched or exceeded by only a handful of other health systems in the nation.

== Mobile Mammography Center ==
In late 2017, New York State Governor Andrew Cuomo announced plans to fund $37.7 Million to help improve access to breast cancer screenings in New York State. Rochester Regional Health was among the recipients for this award to build a Mobile Mammography Center. Introduced in July 2018, the retrofitted RV-style vehicle is equipped with the same as a standing mammography suite, and will travel to and from Monroe County and the seven surrounding counties.

Rochester Regional Health received a three-year grant for up to $4 million total. The grant covered approximately $1 Million for the design and construction of the vehicle, and $3 Million for the staffing and operating costs.

The Rochester Regional Health Mobile Mammography Center is one of two Western New York mobile mammography units to receive the funding.

== Notable staff ==
- Agnes Bartlett Curtis - Long-time Volunteer Red Cross Nurses Aide and American Red Cross administrator. During WWII, as an administrator of the Eastern Area, Curtis organized, trained, and placed volunteer nurses’ aides in nursing services, in U.S. and overseas military hospitals.
- Sophia French Palmer - Early Nurse Reformer and a founder and first editor of the American Journal of Nursing.
- Michael Groff, executive medical director of neuroscience;; he and his family were killed in the 2025 Copake plane crash.
