= Clifton Springs Hospital & Clinic =

Hospital in New York, United States

- Rochester Regional Health
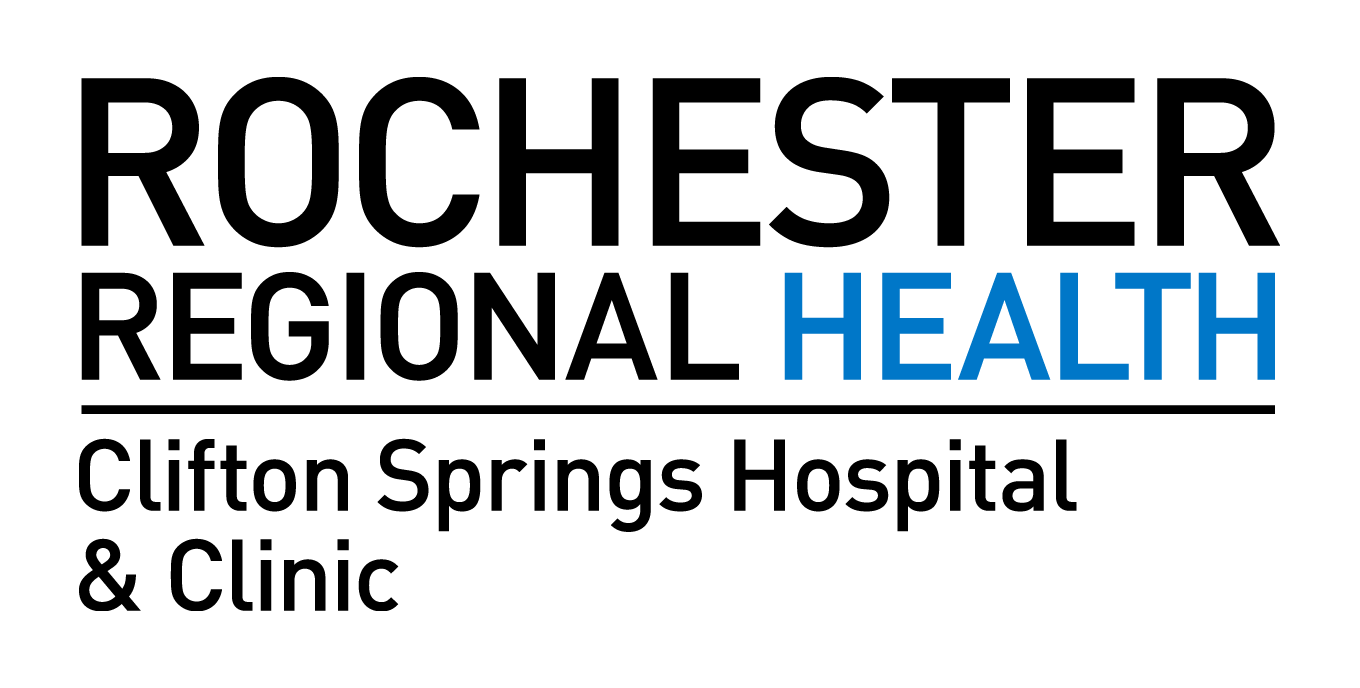

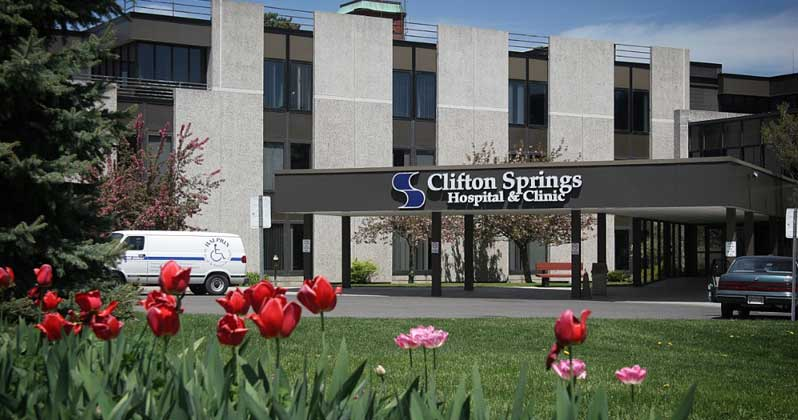

Geography
- Location: 2 Coulter Rd, Clifton Springs, NY 14432, United States
- Coordinates: 42.9597°N 77.1364°W

Organization
- Care system: Private
- Type: General

Services
- Standards: JCAHO accreditation
- Beds: 262

History
- Opened: 1972

Links
- Website: www.rochesterregional.org/locations/hospitals/clifton-springs-hospital-clinic/
- Lists: Hospitals in the United States
- Other links: List of hospitals in the United States

Clifton Springs Hospital & Clinic (CSHC) is affiliate hospital of Rochester Regional Health in the Village of Clifton Springs, New York, in the Finger Lakes Region of Ontario County. Clifton Springs Hospital & Clinic is a 262-bed DNV-accredited community hospital and nursing home.

== History ==
Clifton Springs Hospital & Clinic was built to replace the Sanitarium Building in 1972. The current building was designed from a vision of Dr. Henry Foster, who believed in holistic healing. The building has grown over 150 years into a modern hospital and clinic, including The Springs Integrative Medicine Center where visitors can receive sulphur baths, massage therapy and other holistic treatments.

== Awards and recognition ==
- Eli Pick Facility Leadership Award from American College of Health Care Administrators (ACHCA)
- Excellus Blue Cross/Blue Shield Certificate of Excellence 2015 Hospital Incentive Performance Program
- ISO Certified

== See also ==
- Rochester Regional Health
- Newark-Wayne Community Hospital
- Rochester General Hospital
- Unity Hospital
- United Memorial Medical Center
