= Highland Hospital =

Highland Hospital may refer to:

- Highland Hospital (Oakland, California)
- Highland Hospital (Rochester, New York)
- Highland Hospital (Asheville, North Carolina)
- Highland Hospital, alternative name for Patton State Hospital, San Bernardino, California
