= Newark-Wayne Community Hospital =

- Rochester Regional Health
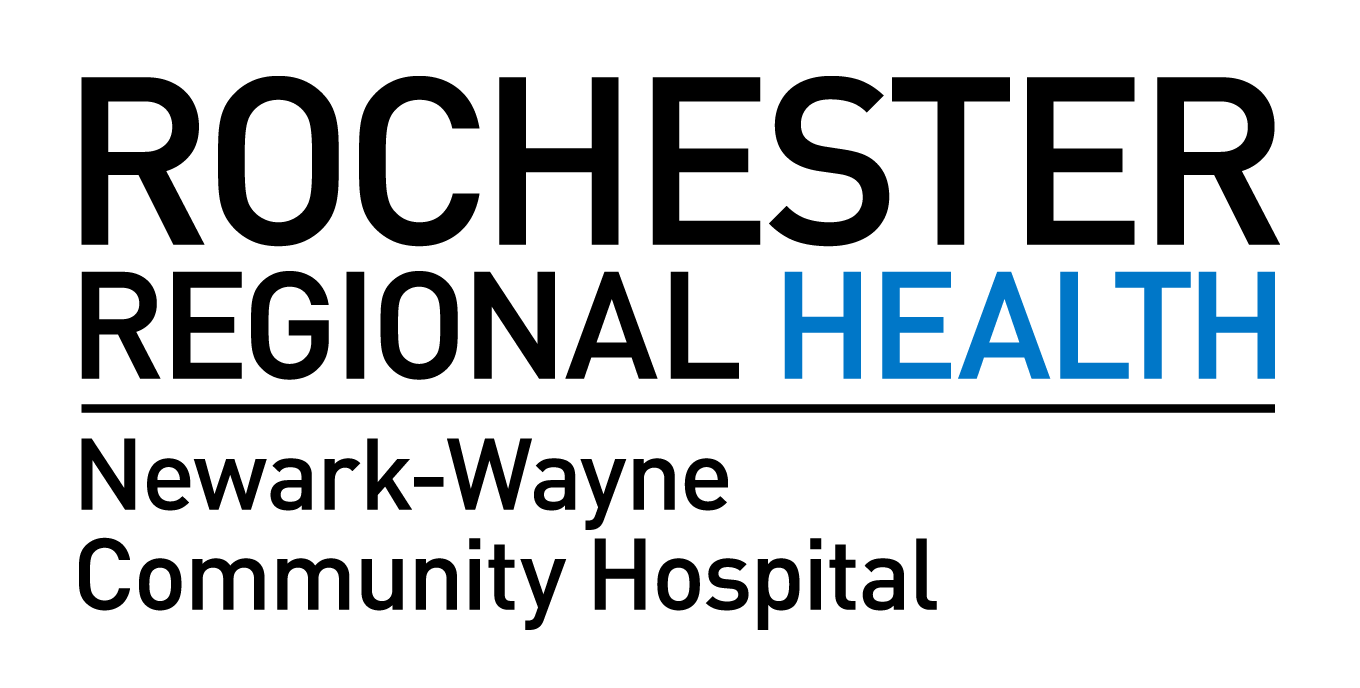

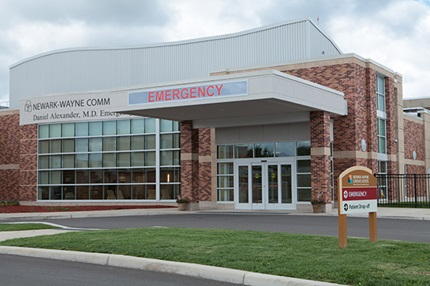

Geography
- Location: 1200 Driving Park Avenue, Newark, New York, United States
- Coordinates: 43°03′36″N 77°06′08″W

Organization
- Care system: Private
- Type: General

Services
- Standards: JCAHO accreditation
- Beds: 120

History
- Opened: 1921

Links
- Website: www.rochesterregional.org/locations/hospitals/newark-wayne-community-hospital/
- Lists: Hospitals in New York State

Newark-Wayne Community Hospital, an affiliate hospital of Rochester Regional Health, is a 120-bed small community hospital in Wayne County, New York. Newark-Wayne Community Hospital was the first of its kind in New York to offer a telemedicine program to connect with its patients. The hospital also provides services including cardiology, urology, obstetrics, gynecology, orthopedics, and pulmonary care.

== Services ==
Newark-Wayne is a New York State-designated Stroke Center, a Level 1 Perinatal Center, a NICHE (Nurses Improving Care for Healthsystem Elders) hospital and a recent recipient of the WHO Baby-Friendly designation.

The hospital's emergency department was renovated in March 2013. Following the renovations, it was named the Daniel Alexander M.D. Emergency Department.

Further renovations began in June 2016, part of Rochester Regional Health's system-wide modernization plan, to include a new modern exterior, add over 2,500 square feet of space, and renovate over 13,000 square feet of existing space to the hospital's main entrance. Additionally, a mediation space just off the waiting area will be built to give guests a quiet place to reflect and pray.

== See also ==
- Rochester Regional Health
- Unity Hospital
- Rochester General Hospital
- Strong Memorial Hospital
- Highland Hospital
- United Memorial Medical Center
- Clifton Springs Hospital & Clinic
