= Lost the Breakup =

Single by Maisie Peters

from the album The Good Witch
- Released: 31 March 2023
- Genre: Pop
- Length: 3:09
- Label: Gingerbread Man; Asylum
- Songwriters: Maisie Peters; Oscar Görres
- Producer: Oscar Görres

Maisie Peters singles chronology
"Body Better" (2023)	"Lost the Breakup" (2023)	"Two Weeks Ago" (2023)

"Lost the Breakup" is a song by English singer-songwriter Maisie Peters. It was released on 31 March 2023, through Gingerbread Man and Asylum Records, as the second single from her second album, The Good Witch (2023).

"Lost the Breakup" explores Peters' emotional reaction to a hard breakup, with the realisation that she has won the breakup in the long run. She has said that before the release of The Good Witch, this was her most-played song and that she wants to perform it live for as long as she can. The song was well received by critics, who praised the lyricism and Peters' vocals, with the Official Charts Company billing it the "song of the year". "Lost the Breakup" charted in Ireland, New Zealand and the United Kingdom.

== Background and release ==
On 27 January 2023, Peters released "Body Better" as the lead single from her then-unreleased second album. Two weeks later, she announced that it would be titled The Good Witch, and released the track listing for the record. "Lost the Breakup" was included in the listing, and in March, she began posting snippets of the song onto TikTok. Weeks later, she announced that it would be released as the second single from The Good Witch on 31 March 2023. On the day of its release, she performed the song on The Tonight Show Starring Jimmy Fallon. In April, she debuted a music video for the song filmed in Tokyo. Like the video for "Body Better", it was directed by Mia Barnes.

== Composition and lyrics ==
"Lost the Breakup" is a pop song and uses guitar and drums as its main instruments. Peters wrote the song with Oscar Görres, who also produced it. They wrote the song in Stockholm, and at the time of writing, Peters knew it would be special and said that it was her most-played song from The Good Witch. She has since said that she wants to play the song live for as long as she can.

Peters said that while "Body Better" saw her at her lowest, "Lost the Breakup" sees her "clawing [her] way back up and out". The lyrical content explores Peters' reaction to a breakup being initial heartbreak, but the realisation that although he may appear to have moved on, she has won in the long run. The lyrics see Peters being petty and angry in tone towards her ex. She described the vibe of the song as "like dressing up in sequins and going to a party with your best friends, like cheap champagne and smudged lipstick and burgers on the floor at 3 a.m."

== Critical reception ==
Professional ratings
Review scores
Source	Rating
Harvard Crimson	3.5/5 stars

Official Charts Company employee George Griffiths billed it the "song of the year". Uproxx's Lexi Lane said that "Lost the Breakup" was an "instant confidence booster". Nina John-Clement of United by Pop said that the song "will be the soundtrack to our lives for the foreseeable future". The Harvard Crimson gave the song 3.5 stars, noting that the production of the song was fairly simple. However, they felt that the toned down production allowed her to showcase her vocals and lyrics.

Music reviewer Thomas Bleach felt that it had delivered a perfect balance of "intimate honest songwriting with big pop production". He billed it "her Taylor Swift pop moment" and felt that it stood alongside "Psycho" and "Body Better" as her best songs. Writing for Glasse Factory, Veronica Yoo liked the "witty" idea of winning or losing the breakup as a way to perceive a breakup.

== Credits and personnel ==
- Maisie Peters – lead vocals, backing vocals, songwriting
- Oscar Görres – backing vocals, bass guitar, drums, guitar, keyboards, programming, songwriting, production
- Stuart Hawkes – mastering
- Mark "Spike" Stent – mixing
- Matt Wolach – mixing assistance

== Charts ==
Chart performance for "Lost the Breakup"
Chart (2023)	Peak position
Ireland (IRMA)	90
Japan Hot Overseas chart (Billboard Japan)	20
New Zealand Hot Singles (Recorded Music NZ)	19
UK Singles (OCC)	85

== Release history ==
Release dates and formats for "Lost the Breakup"
Region	Date	Format	Label	Ref.
Various	31 March 2023	Digital download; streaming	Gingerbread; Asylum	
