= United Memorial Medical Center =

- Rochester Regional Health
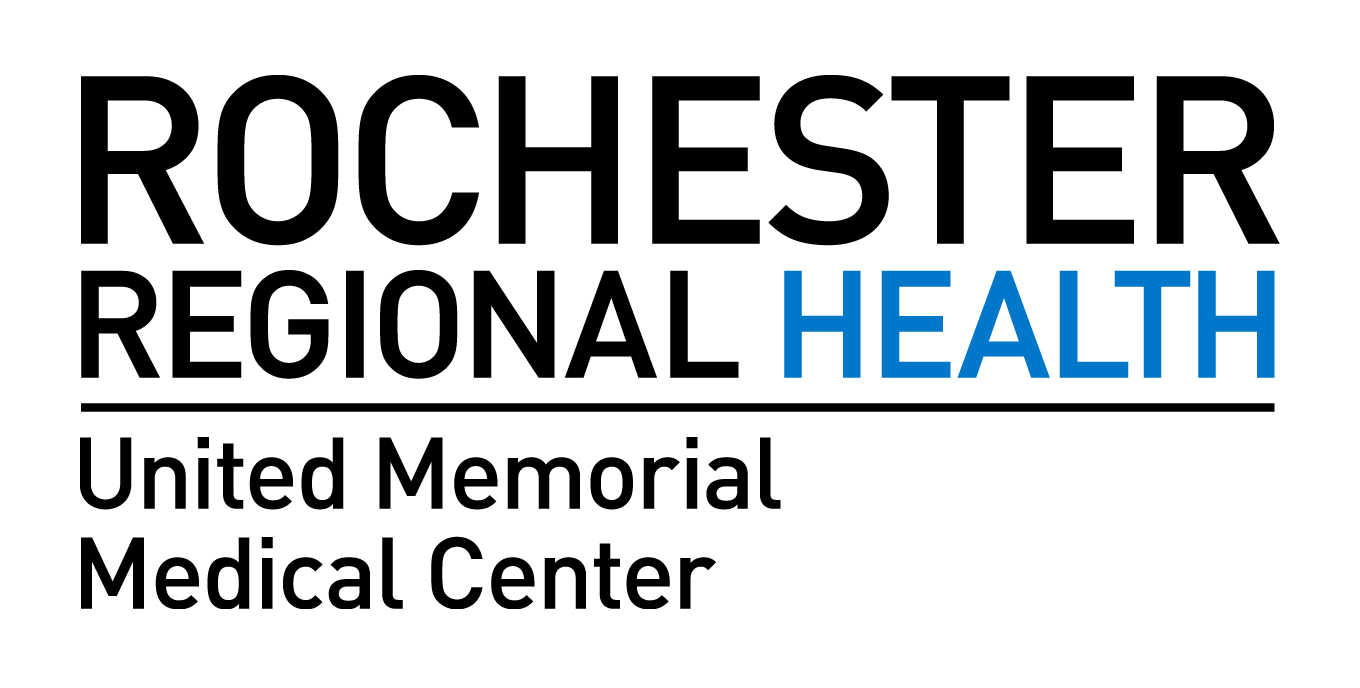

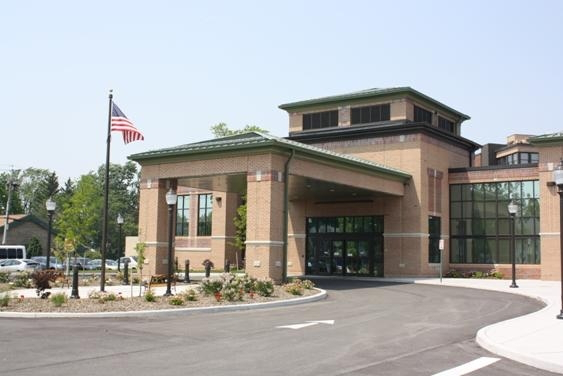

Geography
- Location: 127 North St; Batavia, NY 14020, United States
- Coordinates: 43.005°N 78.1766°W

Organization
- Care system: Private
- Type: General, Teaching

Services
- Beds: 131

Links
- Website: www.rochesterregional.org/locations/hospitals/united-memorial-medical-center/
- Lists: Hospitals in the United States
- Other links: List of hospitals in the United States

United Memorial Medical Center (UMMC) is an affiliate hospital, a part of Rochester Regional Health. Located in Batavia, New York, United Memorial Medical Hospital is a 131-bed community hospital serving the residents of Genesee County and surrounding rural communities. United Memorial is the sole Maternity services provider for Genesee and Orleans Counties, it manages the New York State Cancer Services Partnership Grant for Orleans and Genesee Counties and provide Orthopaedic services in Genesee, Orleans and Wyoming Counties. United Memorial is a NICHE hospital and a New York State-designated Stroke Center.

United Memorial Medical Center is the largest private employer in Genesee County, employing 785 employees.

== History ==
United Memorial Medical Center resulted from the merger of Genesee Memorial and St. Jerome Hospitals in January 2000. United Memorial Medical Center joined the Rochester Regional Health family of affiliate hospitals in January 2016. The hospital continues to offer medical and acute care for patients in Batavia and keeps its name and maintains a local board.

== Teaching affiliations ==
United Memorial serves as a clinical rotation site for medical students from the Lake Erie College of Osteopathic Medicine, the State University of New York at Buffalo, the University of Rochester, Daemen College and D’Youville College. United Memorial also provides a three-year residency program in family medicine to graduate medical students from the Lake Erie College of Osteopathic Medicine.

== Awards and recognition ==
- Press Ganey Commitment to Excellence Award - 2015
- Top Workplace 2015 Buffalo News

== See also ==
- List of Hospitals in New York
- Rochester Regional Health
- Newark-Wayne Community Hospital
- Rochester General Hospital
- Unity Hospital
- Clifton Springs Hospital & Clinic
