= It's Your Bed Babe, It's Your Funeral =

2019 EP by Maisie Peters

EP by Maisie Peters
- Released: 4 October 2019
- Recorded: 2019
- Length: 18:35
- Label: Atlantic
- Producer: Sophie Frances Cooke; Plantboy; Fred; James Earp; Two Inch Punch; Joe Rubel; Oh Wonder

Maisie Peters chronology
Dressed Too Nice for a Jacket (2018)	It's Your Bed Babe, It's Your Funeral (2019)	Trying: Season 2 (2021)

Singles from It's Your Bed Babe, It's Your Funeral
- 1. "This Is on You" Released: 20 September 2019; 2. "Adore You" Released: 4 October 2019

It's Your Bed Babe, It's Your Funeral is the second extended play by English singer-songwriter Maisie Peters. It was released on 4 October 2019 through Atlantic Records. It follows the release of her debut project, Dressed Too Nice for a Jacket (2018) and sees Peters continue working with collaborators including Sophie Frances Cooke, Fred Again, Two Inch Punch and Joe Rubel, as well as new collaborators including Amy Allen and Oh Wonder.

The lyrical content of It's Your Bed Babe, It's Your Funeral revolves around the complexities of romantic relationships, mental health and her relationship with her twin sister. The project saw Peters experiment with different sounds and production, notably on "April Showers". Despite not having production credits, Peters has clarified that she was heavily involved the sonics of the EP. It was praised by critics including Clash and Redbrick, with the former writing that she was "hitting her stride".

== Background and release ==
Peters began independently releasing various singles in 2017, which gained attention in indie-pop circles. Following this attention, she signed with Atlantic Records UK. She eventually released her debut extended play (EP), Dressed Too Nice for a Jacket, on 2 November 2018. Months after the release of the EP, Peters released standalone singles "Stay Young" and "Favourite Ex". She then released "This Is on You" as the lead single from It's Your Bed Babe, It's Your Funeral in September 2019, followed by the release of the EP on 4 October.

== Composition ==
Peters has admitted that she did not intend on making an EP whilst writing for It's Your Bed Babe, It's Your Funeral or its predecessor, Dressed Too Nice for a Jacket. Her intention was to make collections of songs that fit together thematically. She praised her collaborators of the project, specifically the producers. Peters has clarified that she never touched the computer whilst production for the songs was being done, but that she was very involved in the sonics of the tracks and how they all fit together on the EP.

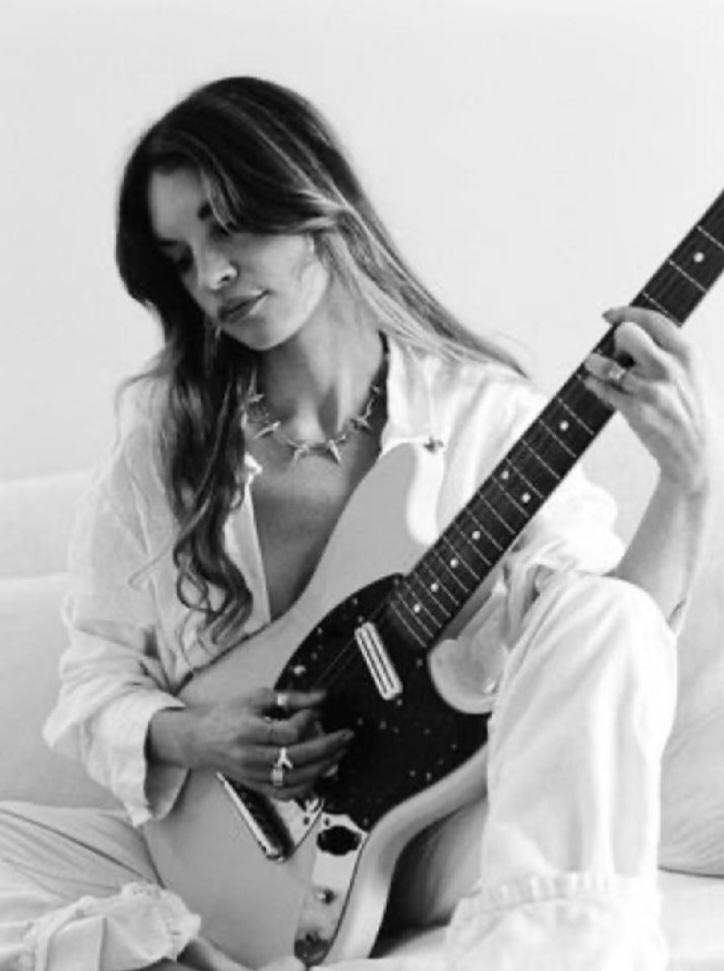
Amy Allen co-wrote "April Showers".

"This Is on You", the first song from It's Your Bed Babe, It's Your Funeral, was written by Peters and friend Sophie Frances Cooke. It was the first song written for the project, written at the beginning of 2019. The song features the title of the EP within its lyrics, but Peters has stated that it was a last-minute addition since she felt her fans would enjoy the line. The lyrical content of the song dissects not feeling a responsibility to take care of someone no longer in Peters' life. She explained: "I feel like especially with women, you're made to feel like you have a responsibility for people. To look after people and take care of them even if you're not their friend anymore. [...] There's this thing where it's like 'oh forgive and forget', but sometimes, that's not the thing. That's not what you need to do".

The second track, "Adore You", encompasses a lyrical shift as it sees Peters sing about the excitement of a new love. "Take Care of Yourself", a "melancholic, sympathetic number", sees the EP slow down. The track is led by soft guitars and pianos and sees Peters taking sympathy on someone who is struggling with their mental health. "April Showers", the fourth song, was inspired by a song by Alexander 23, a friend of Peters'. She wrote it alongside Two Inch Punch and Amy Allen. The production of the song, also handled by Two Inch Punch, was described as "experimental".

Peters co-wrote "Look at Me Now", the fifth song on the EP, with Rory Adams and Steve Robson. Peters has revealed that it was almost not included from the EP and that she was very ill during the writing and recording of the track. Intended to be a "bad bitch" song, it initially had a Eurodance production until Peters asked Joe Rubel to rework it into a slower track. She has admitted that she was still unsure about "Look at Me Now" even after the rework, but was convinced to include it. "Personal Best" closes out It's Your Bed Babe, It's Your Funeral; its lyrical content is an ode to Peters' twin sister, Ellen. The lyrics are predominantly filled with nostalgic memories they experienced together and was noted for not being about a relationship.

== Critical reception ==
Clash wrote a piece on Peters following the release of It's Your Bed Babe, It's Your Funeral, noting that she was "hitting her stride". Emily Calder, writing for the Redbrick, billed "Adore You" and "Personal Best" as the standout tracks from the EP; she wrote that the former was the most deserving of the title "banger", finding it catchy. She wished for more songs like "Personal Best", writing that she felt "refreshed by [Peters'] enchanting take on sad songs that contain a subject matter other than romantic heartbreak".

== Track listing ==
It's Your Bed Babe, It's Your Funeral track listing
No.	Title	Writer(s)	Producer(s)	Length
1.	"This Is on You"	Maisie Peters; Sophie Frances Cooke	Cooke; Plantboy	3:15
2.	"Adore You"	Peters; Fred Gibson	Fred; Plantboy	3:18
3.	"Take Care of Yourself"	Peters; James Earp	Earp	2:57
4.	"April Showers"	Peters; Two Inch Punch; Amy Allen	Two Inch Punch	2:58
5.	"Look at Me Now"	Peters; Rory Adams; Steve Robson	Joe Rubel	3:09
6.	"Personal Best"	Peters; Anthony Michael West; Josephine Hilary Vander Gucht	Oh Wonder	2:55
Total length:				18:35
