= Body Better =

Single by Maisie Peters

from the album The Good Witch
- Released: 27 January 2023
- Genre: Pop; electropop; synth-pop
- Length: 3:10
- Label: Gingerbread Man; Asylum
- Songwriters: Maisie Peters; Ines Dunn; Matias Tellez
- Producer: Matias Tellez

Maisie Peters singles chronology
"Together This Christmas" (2021)	"Body Better" (2023)	"Lost the Breakup" (2023)

"Body Better" is a song by English singer-songwriter Maisie Peters. It was released on 27 January 2023, through Gingerbread Man and Asylum Records, as the lead single from her second album, The Good Witch (2023).

Peters has said that "Body Better" is her most personal song, due to its lyrics exploring the vulnerability felt after a breakup, as well as wondering if her ex-partner's new girlfriend has a better body than her. The emotional lyrics are juxtaposed with an upbeat pop instrumental. The song was well received by critics, who praised the lyrical content, the production and Peters's vocals.

== Background and release ==
Following her debut album, You Signed Up for This (2021), Peters spent 2022 releasing droplet singles that did not form part of a larger project. These included "Cate's Brother", "Blonde" and "Not Another Rockstar", all of which saw Peters explore the pop rock genre. Peters knew they were not going to be included on a project but wanted to share as much music as she could. On 1 January 2023, she posted that with the beginning of a new year, comes a new musical era for her. She posted a photo of the words: "I was good to you", and captioned it: "i spent most of last year scheming and crafting, building and destroying, writing and writing and writing. now it’s a new year [...] so i’m gonna start showing u what i've conjured up." A few days later, she tweeted "do you love her?", which led fans to realise that she was sharing lyrics from an upcoming song.

On 5 January 2023, Peters announced "Body Better" as the lead single of a then-unreleased second album, but did not give it a release date at the time. She described it as "a song about vulnerability and quiet, forbidden fury; about heartbreak and insecurity so deeply rooted you have no idea where it begins or ends." A week later, she gave the song a release date for 27 January. It was released through Gingerbread Man and Asylum Records. The music video, directed by Mia Barnes, was released on 7 February and sees Peters haunting a graveyard. A week later, she announced that "Body Better" was the lead single of The Good Witch.

== Composition and lyrics ==
Sonically, "Body Better" is a pop song that uses synth and electro elements. It uses both electronic and acoustic instruments. The song begins with instrumentation and Peters's vocalisations. The upbeat sonics juxtapose "powerful lyricism". Peters wrote the song alongside Ines Dunn and Matias Tellez, the latter of which also produced it.

The lyrical content of "Body Better" explores Peters after a breakup, wondering what she could have done to cause it, as well as what she could have changed to prevent it happening. It also sees Peters talk about the insecurity and vulnerability of "giving a lot of yourself away to someone who decides they don’t want it anymore". The chorus sees her wonder if she can measure up to her ex-partner's ideals and societal beauty standards, asking "has she got a body better than mine?" The bridge of the song sees the production build up with faster-paced singing, representing "the stream of worries and fears you experience after a breakup". The song was one of the most honest releases for Peters and she billed it her most personal song to date.

== Critical reception ==
Upon its release, Rolling Stone, Billboard, Consequence and Seventeen praised "Body Better". Angela Graczynk (Glasse Factory) said that the title of the song was unrevealing but that the lyrics had left her heartbroken. She commended Peters for capturing the emotions of a breakup "perfectly". Uproxx's Lexi Lane admired that the emotional lyrical content did not "drag the song down" due to its "upbeat pop instrumental and a super catchy chorus". Imprint Entertainment praised Peters's musical growth and was glad to see the lead single showcase "the evolution of [her] acclaimed diary-style songwriting".

Euphoria's Nmesoma Okechukwu opined that it had taken Peters a while to find her unique sound, but felt that she had found it with this song. Phil Arnold, writing for Music Talkers, was surprised by numerous aspects of the song. He expected it to be an 80s-sounding song about body positivity. Upon listening, he was taken aback by how it soon became a very current sounding song with lyrics deemed the opposite of body positivity. He was also surprised by the abrupt ending of the track. Despite his initial reaction, he liked "Body Better" and found it catchy. CelebMix wrote that the standout from the song is Peters's vocals, as well as complimenting the production.

=== Accolades ===
"Body Better" was nominated for the 2023 Popjustice £20 Music Prize, losing to Raye's "Escapism".

== Charts ==
Chart performance for "Body Better"
Chart (2023)	Peak position
New Zealand Hot Singles (Recorded Music NZ)	23

== Release history ==
Release dates and formats for "Body Better"
Region	Date	Format	Label	Ref.
Various	27 January 2023	Digital download; streaming	Gingerbread; Asylum	
