= Maisie Peters =

British singer (born 2000)

- Peters in 2022

Background information
- Born: Maisie Hannah Peters; 28 May 2000 (age 26); Steyning, England
- Origin: Brighton, England
- Genres: Pop; indie pop
- Occupations: Singer; songwriter
- Instruments: Vocals; guitar
- Works: Discography; songs
- Years active: 2015–present
- Labels: Atlantic; Gingerbread Man
- Publisher: Universal Music Publishing Group
- Website: www.maisiepeters.co.uk

Maisie Hannah Peters (born 28 May 2000) is an English singer and songwriter. She began her professional career independently, releasing two singles, "Place We Were Made" and "Birthday". In 2018, she signed with Atlantic Records UK, with whom she released two EPs and the second series soundtrack to the British comedy series, Trying.

In 2021, she signed with Ed Sheeran's Gingerbread Man Records, a label distributed by Atlantic Records. Shortly afterwards, in August, she released her debut studio album, You Signed Up for This. Peters released her second album, The Good Witch, in June 2023, with which she became the youngest solo British female artist in nearly a decade to top the UK album charts. Her third studio album, Florescence, was released in May 2026.

== Early life ==
Maisie Hannah Peters was born on 28 May 2000 in Steyning, a small town in West Sussex, England to a geography teacher and communications worker, Nick and Diane Peters, respectively. She has a non-identical twin sister, Ellen, who has been featured on her YouTube channel and was the inspiration behind Peters' 2021 single "Brooklyn".

Peters began singing around age eight, performing in choirs. She wrote her first song at age nine and began writing songs regularly at the age of 12, after borrowing her friend's guitar for a school project. She attended Steyning Grammar School, where she won the 2015 annual talent show with a performance of her own composition "Electric". She was a part of the Ariel Company Theatre.

== Career ==
=== 2015-2020: Early career ===
At age 15, Peters began busking on the streets of Brighton and uploading original songs to YouTube. At age 15 in 2016, Peters performed her first recorded show, performing several original songs on The Ayala Show. In August 2017, Peters independently released her debut single, "Place We Were Made". Four months later, she released her second single, "Birthday". The songs gained attention in indie-pop circles and "Place We Were Made" was named BBC Introducing's song of the week early 2018. Following this attention, Peters signed with Atlantic Records UK. Under Atlantic, she released various singles, notably "Worst Of You", as well as two EPs; Dressed Too Nice for a Jacket and It's Your Bed Babe, It's Your Funeral.

In 2020, Peters contributed the song "Smile" to the soundtrack album Birds of Prey, for the film of the same name. She was also announced as the opening act for Niall Horan's Nice to Meet Ya Tour on tour dates in Europe. However, these concerts were cancelled due to the COVID-19 pandemic. Peters released work for another soundtrack in 2021, this time for the second series of Apple TV+ original series Trying. She wrote and performed all songs, with features by fellow British recording artists James Bay on the song "Funeral", Griff on the song "Happy Hunting Ground", and Bear's Den on the song "I Want You To Change (Because You Want To Change)". Around this time, Peters created an online book club via Instagram.

=== 2021–2024: You Signed Up for This and The Good Witch ===
Peters at Fingerprints Music in March 2022

In June 2021, Peters signed with Ed Sheeran's vanity label Gingerbread Man Records, distributed by Atlantic Records. She released her debut studio album You Signed Up for This that August. The album debuted at number two on the UK Albums Chart and was the top selling album in UK independent record stores for that week. With the first two singles of the record, "John Hughes Movie" and "Psycho", Peters achieved her first entries on the UK Singles Chart. Peters embarked on her first headlining tour in 2022, touring the United States. Later that year, she joined Sheeran's +–=÷x Tour as an opening act. While touring, she released singles "Cate's Brother", "Blonde", "Good Enough" and "Not Another Rockstar". Peters later announced she would tour the United Kingdom in April 2023.

On 27 January 2023, Peters released "Body Better", the lead single from her second album, calling it one of her "most honest songs ever". Following this, on 15 February 2023, Peters announced the release of her second album, The Good Witch, alongside its track listing, which was released on 23 June 2023, describing it as her own "twisted version of a breakup album". "Lost the Breakup" served as the second single from The Good Witch. With this album, Peters became the youngest solo British female artist in almost a decade to chart number one on the UK Charts, after Ella Henderson in 2014. She released a deluxe version on 27 October 2023, which included six additional tracks. Peters won the inaugural Rolling Stone UK Breakthrough Award in 2023. Peters made her film debut in the 2024 Amazon Prime romantic comedy How to Date Billy Walsh as herself. Peters opened for Taylor Swift’s The Eras Tour at Wembley Stadium on 19 August 2024. Peters was set to support Kelsea Ballerini on her North American arena tour in 2025. She pulled out in December 2024, citing prioritising her mental health as one of the main reasons for doing so, as well as wanting to complete her third studio album to the best of her ability.

=== 2025–present: Florescence ===
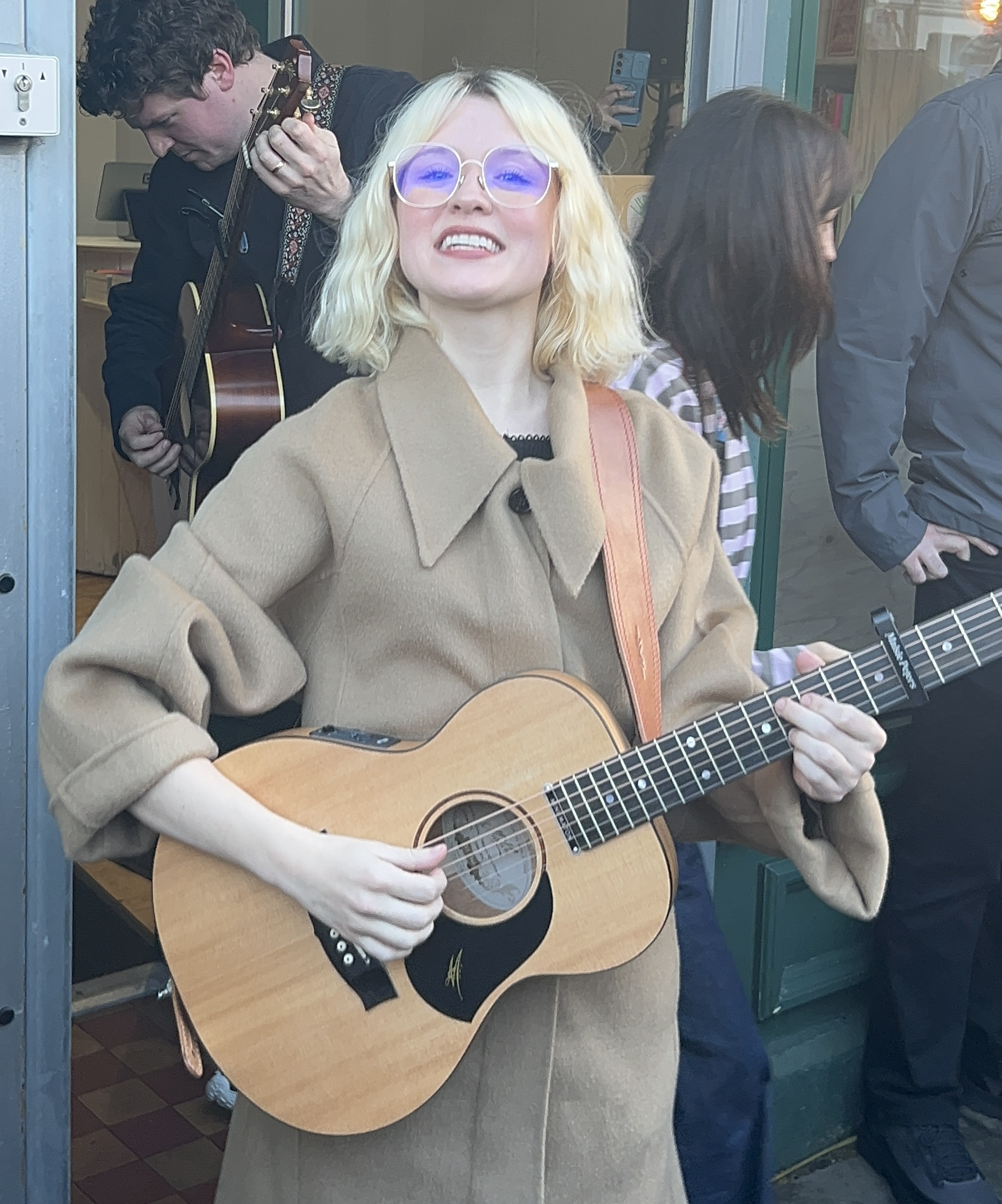
Peters performing at a bookstore in Newcastle upon Tyne in January 2026.

In June 2025, Peters started a podcast with her twin sister, called Twinhood. In October 2025, Peters was unveiled as the face of Giorgio Armani's "That's So Armani" campaign. That same month, Peters announced the release of "Audrey Hepburn", her first music release in over two years. On 9 October, the song was released, as well as a surprise release, "You You You". She confirmed the two songs were dual lead singles for her upcoming third studio album. The music videos for "You You You" and "Audrey Hepburn" were released to YouTube and Spotify on 24 October and 6 November 2025, respectively. "Say My Name in Your Sleep", featuring credited backing vocals from album collaborator Marcus Mumford, served as the third single from the project, released on 19 November.

On 28 January 2026, Peters revealed the album's title, Florescence, and that it would be released on 15 May. Two days before the album announcement, she confirmed further dates on her Before the Bloom tour, for which she had played three intimate shows in London and New York. A fourth single, "My Regards", was released on 6 February, accompanied by a music video directed by Amelia Dimoldenberg and featuring Benito Skinner. The next month, Peters was credited as a co-writer on "Millions" by British girl group Say Now.

The fifth single from Florescence, "Kingmaker", featuring Julia Michaels, cited as one of Peters' musical inspirations, was released on 21 April 2026. On 29 April, it was announced that the album was delayed until 22 May. One week before the release of the album, Peters announced that, on 8 May 2027, she would be playing her first major headline show at The O2 Arena in London. On 13 June 2026, Peters made her debut on the stage of the Grand Ole Opry in Nashville, Tennessee. Between July and September 2026, Peters released a number of live versions of songs from the Florescence album on YouTube, under the subtitle "(Live From My Parents' Piano)".

On 23 October 2026, Peters released a song for the soundtrack of the third season of Nobody Wants This, entitled "Hands On Me".

== Artistry and influences ==
Peters possesses a soprano voice. She is a self described "massive fan" of Taylor Swift, considering Swift a "formative" influence on her music, and expressed admiration for English-Irish girl group Girls Aloud and English artist Lily Allen. She names F. Scott Fitzgerald and Donna Tartt as her literary influences. She has also cited Arctic Monkeys, My Chemical Romance, Florence and the Machine, All Time Low and Fall Out Boy as influences in her more pop rock songs.

== Discography ==
- You Signed Up for This (2021)
- The Good Witch (2023)
- Florescence (2026)

== Filmography ==
Year	Title	Role	Notes
2020–2021	Trying	Busker	Episodes: "The Ex-Girlfriend" and "Helicopters"
2022	Never Mind the Buzzcocks	Herself	Panellist; 1 episode
2024	How to Date Billy Walsh	Herself	Cameo

== Tours ==
=== Headlining act ===
==== Maisie Peters ====
- Maisie Peters UK Tour (2019)
- Maisie Peters NA Tour (2019)

==== You Signed Up For This ====
- You Signed Up For This NA tour (2022)

==== Maisie Takes… ====
- I'm Telling The Whole Of America Tour (2022)
- Maisie Takes Australia and New Zealand (2023)
- Maisie Takes Japan Tour (2023)
- Road to Hammersmith Tour (2023)
- Maisie Takes Europe Tour (2023)

==== The Good Witch ====
- The Good Witch Comes to North America (2023)
- Road to Wembley Tour (2023)
- The Good Witch Comes to Europe (2024)
- The Good Witch Comes to Australia (2024)

==== Florescence ====
- Before The Bloom (2025–2026)

=== Acoustic shows ===
- You Signed Up For These Record Store Shows (2021)
- An Evening With The Good Witch (UK) (2023)
- The Good Witch Comes to a Record Store Near You (US) (2023)
- Florists and Bookshops Acoustic Sessions (2026)
- Florescence Intimate Record Store Shows (2026)

=== Opening act ===
Peters opening for the +−=÷× Tour in Copenhagen 2022

- Mahalia's Tour (UK dates) (2017)
- Tom Walker's Tour (European dates) (2018)
- Ed Sheeran's +–=÷x Tour (2022–2025)
- Coldplay's Music of the Spheres World Tour (European dates) (2024)
- Noah Kahan's The Stick Season (We'll All Be Here Forever) Tour (European Dates) (2024)
- Taylor Swift's The Eras Tour (Wembley, 19 August 2024)
- Conan Gray's Found Heaven On Tour (American dates) (2024)

== Awards and nominations ==
Organisation	Year	Nominee(s)	Category	Result	Ref.
Berlin Music Video Awards	2021	"John Hughes Movie"	Best Concept	Nominated	
Hollywood Music in Media Awards	2021	"Neck of the Woods"	Best Original Song in a TV Show/Limited Series	Nominated	
Popjustice	2023	"Body Better"	Popjustice £20 Music Prize	Nominated	
Rolling Stone UK Awards	2023	Herself	Breakthrough Award	Won	
Trinity College Dublin	2023	Herself	Allii Proelio Award	Won	
