= St. Lawrence Health System =

New York (state) hospital system

Coordinates: 44°40′36″N 74°58′57″W

- Abbreviation: SLH
- Type: Nonprofit organization
- Headquarters: Rochester, NY
- Services: Hospital network

St. Lawrence Health System is an upstate New York three-hospital healthcare provider that is part of the Rochester Regional Health system in Western NY. St. Lawrence Health System encompasses what formerly were Canton-Potsdam Hospital, E.J. Noble Hospital and Massena Memorial Hospital.

== History ==
St. Lawrence began in 2013 as "a new two-hospital system." It subsequently expanded by adding Massena Memorial Hospital in 2019.

In 2019, as they were beginning their Massena takeover, they obtained funding for "patient-centered" training and grants "providing low-income St. Lawrence County residents free rides to non-medical destinations like pharmacies, grocery stores, farmer’s markets, self-help classes and other places that could improve their health."

Their special services programs include inpatient detox/rehab and Center for Cancer Care.

In January 2021, Rochester Regional Health acquired St. Lawrence Health System, a three-hospital system. The affiliation aims to strengthen the care that is delivered in the North Country communities served by St. Lawrence Health System.
