= Andaman Discoveries =

Andaman Discoveries (AD) is a tourism social enterprise in Kuraburi, Phang Nga Province, Thailand. It is the continuation of North Andaman Tsunami Relief (NATR), a non-profit organization based in Thailand that provides assistance to tsunami-affected villages in the north Andaman Sea region. Andaman Discoveries has assumed the work of NATR, fostering long-term social, economic, and environmental sustainability and generating viable economic opportunities via training and marketing.

== History ==
The Boxing Day Tsunami devastated many coastal villages along the Andaman coast of Thailand on 26 December 2004. The North Andaman Tsunami Relief (NATR), the parent organization of Andaman Discoveries, was formed by Bodhi Garrett in early 2005 to help villagers to rebuild their villages and livelihood. A network of volunteers and donors emerged to support the reconstruction process. NATR implemented about 120 projects in 22 communities, with the emphasis on direct cooperation with the villagers, rather than imposing what outsiders think is good for them.

Eighteen months later, Andaman Discoveries came into existence as a continuation of NATR's community development work. It started from the villagers' consideration that community based tourism could be seen as a good opportunity to generate additional income without having to give up their traditional ways of living. Training and supports were provided to the villagers while Andaman Discoveries helps to promote and facilitate cultural exchanges between villagers and tourists / volunteers.

== Projects ==
With the help of volunteers and visitors, Andaman Discoveries has been able to organize and sustain several in-village projects using existing funds and contributions to the Community Fund. These projects include:

=== Sustainable Livelihoods ===
- Teaching English to kids, adults, guides, and host families
- Creative workshops with local children
- Hand-crafted soap and Batik cooperatives

=== Conservation ===
- Beach clearance and waste management
- Mangrove reforestation
- Wildlife and environmental conservation projects
- Orchid conservation
- Beautification of community or school gardens
- Interpretive nature trail data collection with local guides
- GPS land-use mapping

=== Community Development ===
- Construction of a community center
- Long-term scholarships
- Teacher placement in local and village schools
- Teaching community aerobics or yoga

== Partners ==
AD's partners include research firms, educational institutions, governmental branches, and NGOs, with names such as the International Union for Conservation of Nature, Rotary International, University of California, Los Angeles, InterVol (University of Birmingham), and The Mangrove Action Project.

== See also ==
- Adventure travel
- Ecotourism
- Sustainable tourism
- Voluntourism
