= Samaritan Medical Center =

New York (state) hospital system

Geography
- Location: Watertown, New York, United States
- Coordinates: 43°57′54″N 75°54′52″W

Services
- Emergency department: Level III Trauma Center
- Beds: 294

History
- Opened: 1881

Links
- Lists: Hospitals in New York State

Samaritan Medical Center is a 294-bed not-for-profit medical facility located in Watertown, New York.

The hospital was awarded "gold recognition for its efforts to increase organ, eye, and tissue donor registrations" via education and outreach programs.

== History ==
The hospital opened in 1881 as The House of the Good Samaritan. They've since renamed and done several expansions. Local government statistics indicate they have over 2,000 employees.

They've helped other hospitals with necessary short-duration assistance programs. During the 2010s, when E.J. Noble Hospital had some financial difficulties, Samaritan was supervising some of their units, and the name E.J. Noble Samaritan was temporarily used for Noble. In 2019 they helped raise funds for Children’s Miracle Network of Northern New York.

== Controversy ==
In 2016 a unit of the hospital was ordered by the government to repay "close to $1 million in undue Tricare reimbursements" that were "skimmed" 2009 through 2014.

=== Clinical affiliation ===
A clinical affiliation with other hospitals was offered in 2017. Samaritan allegedly "was invited to affiliation talks but declined, despite denials from Samaritan’s chief executive officer."
