= Dressed Too Nice for a Jacket =

2018 EP by Maisie Peters

EP by Maisie Peters
- Released: 2 November 2018
- Recorded: 2017–2018
- Genre: Folk-pop
- Length: 19:50
- Label: Atlantic
- Producer: Fred Gibson; Charlie Russell; Jon Green; Joe Rubel; Brad Ellis; Ed Thomas; Two Inch Punch

Maisie Peters chronology
Dressed Too Nice for a Jacket (2018)	It's Your Bed Babe, It's Your Funeral (2019)

Singles from Dressed Too Nice for a Jacket
- 1. "In My Head" Released: 8 October 2018; 2. "Details" Released: 23 October 2018

Dressed Too Nice for a Jacket is the debut extended play by English singer-songwriter Maisie Peters. It was released on 2 November 2018 through Atlantic Records. Peters had previously released singles independently, which gathered the attention of Atlantic and led to her being signed as a teenager. She worked with songwriters and producers including Fred Gibson, Charlie Russell, Jon Green, Brad Ellis, Two Inch Punch and Joe Rubel, many of whom she went on to work with again in the future.

The EP is primarily a folk-pop project and features songs mostly led by piano and guitar. The lyrical content of Dressed Too Nice for a Jacket revolves around mourning a former relationship and finding it difficult to move on, losing friends to university, finding new love and hoping a former partner is suffering. Tracks on the EP were likened to the works of Taylor Swift, Joni Mitchell and Lily Allen, with Peters' complimented for her "vulnerable, relatable storytelling" at the age of 18.

== Background and release ==
Peters began singing around age eight, performing in choirs. She began writing songs regularly at the age of 12, after borrowing her friend's guitar for a school project. At age 15, she began busking on the streets of Brighton and uploading original songs to YouTube. In 2017, she began independently releasing various singles which gained attention in indie-pop circles. Her debut single, "Place We Were Made", was named BBC Introducing's song of the week in early 2018. Following this attention, Peters signed with Atlantic Records UK. Later in 2018, Peters released "In My Head" and "Details" under Atlantic as the two singles from the project. She has stated that they are her favourite tracks from Dressed Too Nice for a Jacket, which was released as her debut extended play (EP) on 2 November 2018.

== Composition ==
Dressed Too Nice for a Jacket has been described as a folk-pop project. Whilst writing for the EP, Peters included a mixture of stories about herself and retells of her friends' experiences. Although she found it cathartic to write about herself, she felt that writing from another person's perspective helped her to learn new things about herself and create interesting stories. Peters said that although her primary goal when making songs is to make the best possible music, being able to reach listeners with relatable stories was "always in the back of [her] mind". She felt that connecting with listeners was "the best side effect ever" and adored helping people through difficult situations such as break-ups, losing friends or moving away. When asked about the title of the EP, she explained that it was a reference to nights out she had with her friends as teenagers, where they would "mess around falling in love with strangers and drinking cheap wine through a straw". On working with producers including Fred Gibson, Jon Green and Two Inch Punch, she said: "they are all such sick producers but also genuinely hilarious, lovely people. It really is just like working with your very overly talented best friends".

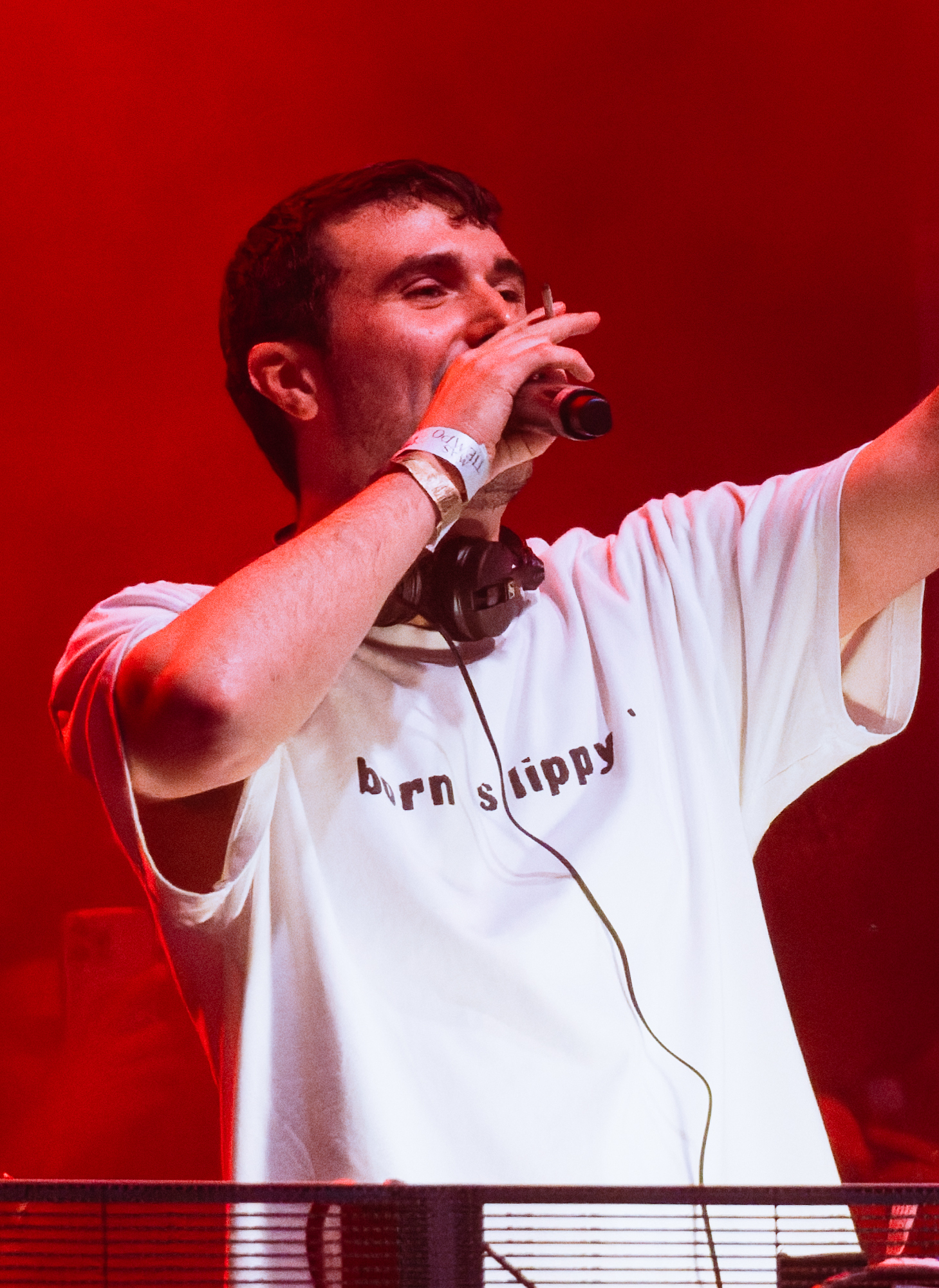
Fred Again co-wrote and produced "In My Head", the first song on the EP.

Peters requested that people listen to the EP from start to finish to experience a chronological storytelling throughout. "In My Head", the first song on Dressed Too Nice for a Jacket was written by Peters and Gibson, as well as being produced by Gibson. It is a pop song. The lyrics document the emotional pain of having to move on from an ex-partner when you still have feelings for them. "Details" follows, in which her ex-partner has found a new partner. Peters sings about not wanting to hear details of their new relationship, finding it painful to know about. It was likened to the works of Taylor Swift and Joni Mitchell. The third track, "Enough for You", features a sonic shift from the prior to tracks, being piano-led and having Peters' vocals electronically distorted. The song showcases Peters' higher pitch of singing. Peters wrote it with Joe Rubel, who also handled the production. The lyrics are based on an encounter that Rubel had with his driving instructor. His instructor had experienced another student of his, a married housewife, confessing her love to him. Peters and Rubel then wrote "Enough for You" within 30 minutes, writing it from her perspective. They detailed an experience that was not true love, but instead her "first taste of independence". She later said: "It wasn’t written about me at all but doing it live, I've connected with it".

"Architecture", the fourth song on the EP, was billed by Euphoria as a "trademark Maisie song". A "softly-spoken song" with a strumming guitar to accompany her vocals, Peters stated that over time, it had become about her friends leaving their hometown for university. "You to You" follows and marks a lyrical shift from the rest of the EP, being likened to the work of Lily Allen. The lyrical content dissects Peters' attitude towards an ex that messed with her mental state, as well as the euphoria of realising they were not the one and hoping someone breaks their heart. Peters described it as a "simple song about fuckboys and the rage and pettiness they inspire". "Be Careful" by rapper Cardi B was an inspiration for the song since Peters admired her simultaneous power and vulnerability on the song. The closing track, "Feels Like This", returned to the slow, piano-led style that featured on previous tracks, but its lyrics detail "a sense of hope that after all the heartbreak". Peters sings about finding a new partner that loves her the way she wants and it was described as "a happy ending".

== Critical reception ==
The Line of Best Fit stated that Dressed Too Nice for a Jacket had made them "truly sit up and take notice" of Peters. They were surprised by her "painfully relatable lyrics" at the age of 18. Writing for Euphoria, Aimee Phillips praised the EP, complimenting Peters' "vulnerable, relatable storytelling". She felt that it was the "perfect debut EP" for an 18-year-old Peters, billing her a "brightly shining talent" and looking forward to seeing what she would do next. Kelly McCafferty Dorogy of Atwood wrote that Peters had the songwriting skills of Taylor Swift and the "delicate yet fierce" vocals of Ed Sheeran. She described the EP as a "powerful, downright masterful introduction to the world". Peters was surprised by the reception to Dressed Too Nice for a Jacket, particularly to the non-singles. She appreciated that in the streaming era, people could access songs that are not being promoted heavily and found it "really special seeing everyone find these little gems that [she has] loved and not known if other people would love too".

== Track listing ==
Dressed Too Nice for a Jacket track listing
No.	Title	Writer(s)	Producer(s)	Length
1.	"In My Head"	Maisie Peters; Fred Gibson	Gibson	3:07
2.	"Details"	Peters; Jon Green	Charlie Russell; Green	3:08
3.	"Enough for You"	Peters; Joe Rubel	Rubel	2:51
4.	"Architecture"	Peters; Brad Ellis; Ed Thomas	Ellis	3:22
5.	"You to You"	Peters; Two Inch Punch	Two Inch Punch	3:37
6.	"Feels Like This"	Peters; Alex Montague; Ellis; Louis Collard-Watson; Negin Djefari	Ellis	3:43
Total length:				19:50
