= The Ayala Show =

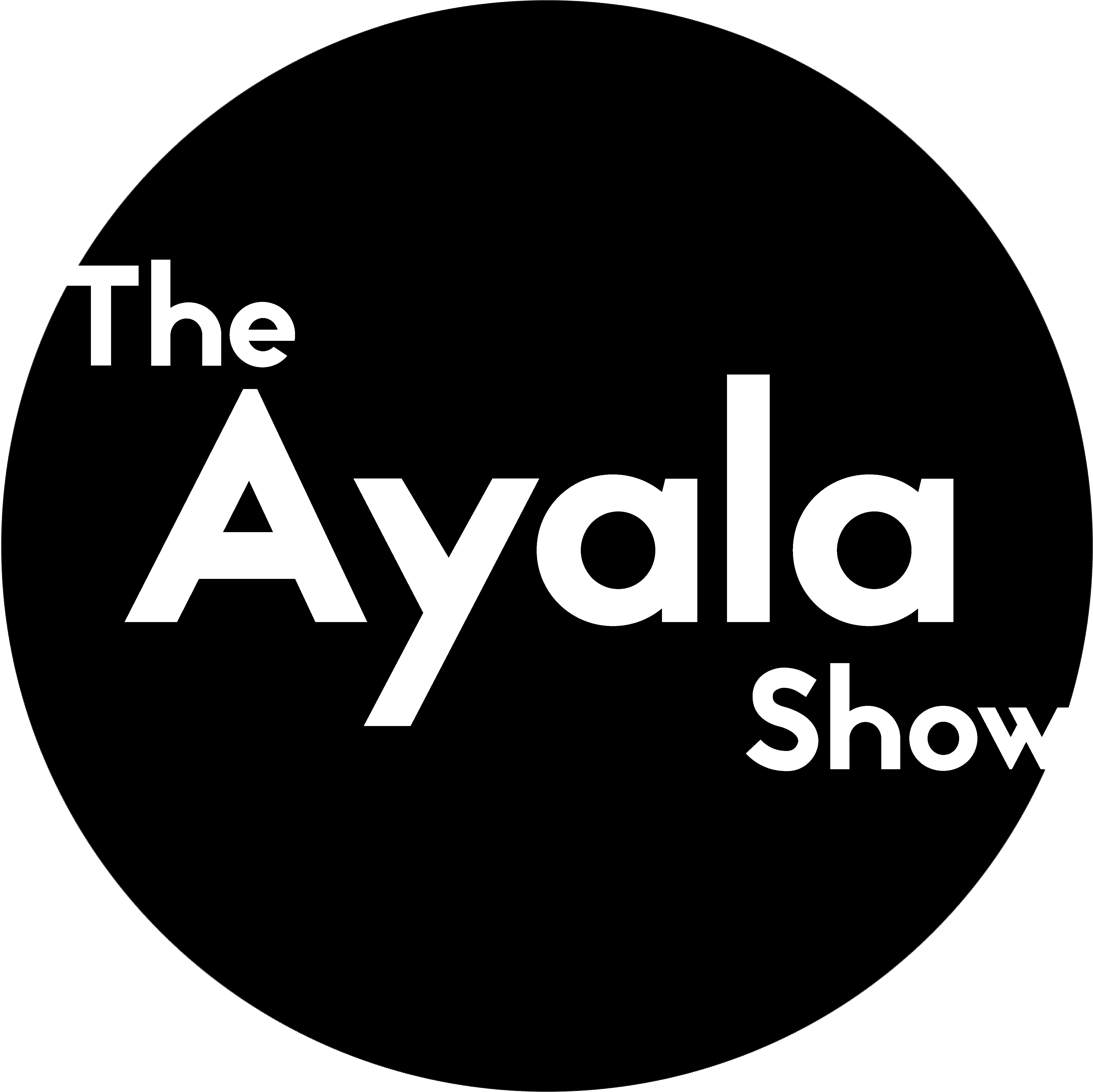
- Genre: Music, Entertainment
- Created by: Mind Motion Media
- Directed by: Finnian E. Moore
- Presented by: Ayala
- Country of origin: United Kingdom
- No. of series: 2
- No. of episodes: 13

Production
- Production location: Battersea Park Studios
- Running time: 24 minutes

Original release
- Network: Irish TV
- Release: 9 October 2015 – 23 September 2016

The Ayala Show was a live music television show that aired every Friday at 10 pm on Irish TV from October 2015 until September 2016. It was hosted by singer-songwriter Ayala, and featured live performances by musical artists, sometimes with Ayala. Additional performances were uploaded to YouTube. The show was filmed and recorded in Studio 1 of Battersea Park Studios, formerly known as Sphere Studios, where Adele recorded 21. Audio was handled by Ayala's brother, Juan Luis Ayala, and the show was directed by Ayala's husband, Finnian E. Moore.

The "travel special" episodes were hosted at locations other than the studio. Locations included Cancale, France with gypsy jazz guitarist Dominique Carré, Mexico with Horacio Palencia and Noel Schajris, and Los Angeles.

== Notable performers ==
Notable performers on the show included:

- Bloom Twins
- Eska
- Gilbert O’Sullivan
- Jo Harman
- Keith Harkin
- Leddra Chapman
- Maisie Peters, who performed on the show at age 15
- Natacha Atlas
- Sam Lee
