= Ayala (musician) =

- Born: Jennifer Heather Brigid Ayala Moore; Dublin, Ireland
- Genres: Alternative, Pop, Rock, jazz, blues, Latin
- Occupations: Musician, composer, television presenter
- Instrument: Vocals
- Years active: 2012–present
- Website: Official site

Jennifer Heather Brigid Ayala Moore, known mononymously as Ayala, is an Irish recording artist, singer, songwriter and television host based in London, United Kingdom. Her debut album This Year was released in December 2015. She continues to release music and in more recent years has been fusing Mexican and Latin music and working a lot in Mexico. Ayala has performed a number of duets with well known artists such as Gilbert O'Sullivan, Horacio Palencia, Los Rumberos, and Lupita Infante. 'México (Can I Stay)' is a collaboration with Lupita Infante and El Mariachi Imperial Azteca which was released in September 2020.

== Music ==
Ayala performed a duet with Gilbert O'Sullivan on 'I Guess I'll Always Love You' from his 2015 album Latin Ala G! A different Spanish version of this duet was released by Ayala in January 2020. Ayala has recorded and written with Latin American artist Horacio Palencia. They have released 2 singles together, 'Never Give Up' which released in 2017, and also a Spanish version 'No Te Rindas No' which was released in 2019. 'Que Quieres De Mi' which also features the collaboration of urban Cuban artist El Chacal was released in Feb 2019. Other singles include 'La Luna' and 'Uphill' featuring Los Rumberos. Ayala as a songwriter has written songs for and with many other artists both for the Anglo and Latin American markets.

Her debut single 'On My Way' was ranked in the top 10 in the Music Week pop club charts in 2013. The single was featured on a double A-side release with 'The Sun Has Come'. On My Way was remixed by several artists including Cahill, Red Top & Lati and Andi Durrant. The Sun Has Come was remixed by Joey Negro.

== Television ==
Since October 2015, Ayala has released many singles, collaborated with many artists and been the host and producer of the contemporary music TV show The Ayala Show in which she interviews artists, presents travel features and performs alongside guests.
