= Edinburgh Global Partnerships =

- Founder: Benjamin Carey
- Type: Charitable organization
- Registration no.: Scotland: SC018757
- Purpose: International Development
- Location: Edinburgh, Scotland, United Kingdom
- Region served: Edinburgh, Africa, Asia and South-America
- Revenue: £50,597 per year (average 2013-2017)
- Formerly called: HELP Scotland

Edinburgh Global Partnerships SCIO, or EGP, is a student-run charity based at the University of Edinburgh that assists in community-led development projects overseas.

EGP's four main aims are:

- To support community led initiatives, working together with people to help them achieve their long-term goals for development.
- To allow volunteers to develop new skills and a wider perspective on the world we live in.
- To promote international understanding through projects that are focussed on building friendship, trust and respect between EGP volunteers and people across the world.
- To establish partnerships with local organisations to encourage volunteers to participate in volunteering in and around Edinburgh.

In March 2012, EGP was awarded a "Global Society Star" Award by Edinburgh University Students' Association (EUSA) in recognition of their contribution to the "global experience on campus, in the local community, and abroad". In April 2019, EGP was awarded EUSA's "Outstanding Contribution to the Global Community Award".

== History ==
EGP was founded as a society at the University of Edinburgh by student Benjamin Carey in 1990 and subsequently achieved charity status later that year. It is thought to be the oldest international volunteer organisation across UK universities. In 2019, EGP ceased to be a society at the University of Edinburgh and became a Scottish Charitable Incorporated Organisation (SCIO).

EGP was originally called H.E.L.P. (Scotland) standing for Humanitarian Education & Long-term Projects.

== Committee ==
EGP is managed by committee members who are responsible for the running of the charity. Committee members also work on a voluntary basis.

== Project Selection and Implementation Process ==
EGP works by partnering with NGOs and communities from all over the world. Every year, it implements 5/6 projects.

Communities and NGOs apply to work with EGP by submitting a Project Proposal. Over the summer, the Project Researcher and Developer works directly with each applicant and clarifies any questions pertaining to the proposal. The EGP Committee as a whole then compiles and submits further questions to each applicant. When this process is complete, the Committee meets to decide which projects will be selected. Selected projects must be both sustainable and supported by the local community. Projects are selected in September/October.

Once projects have been selected, the Committee recruits 6-10 volunteers for each project. Teams of volunteers work with EGP throughout the academic year, attending weekly trainings on topics such as cultural awareness, safety and health. Each team of volunteers is tasked with raising the funds necessary to implement their project. This is usually done through donations, sponsorships and charity events. In 2019, EGP volunteers participated in the Meadows Marathon. Volunteer fundraising activities were featured in STV Magazine in February 2012.

In the summer, teams travel to their host community to provide unskilled labour and assistance for the implementation of each project.

== Past Projects ==
Past EGP Projects have included the construction of the New Vision School in Tanzania in 2006, a grinding mill and a house in Zambia in 2005 and the construction of a conventional dairy goat breeding unit in Kisumu, Kenya in 2011. EGP has also been involved in projects addressing the " widespread problem" of "exploitative sexual relations between teachers and student" in Uganda.

== UK partners ==
EGP is a member of the Scotland's International Development Alliance (SIDA, formerly NIDOS). EGP was featured in the NIDOS March 2012 Newsletter.

EGP is part of the Student International Development Network (SIDN). SIDN is "a partnership between UK based student-led international volunteering groups", and it includes InterVol, Oxford Development Abroad (ODA), Student Volunteering Abroad (SVA) Glasgow and Bristol Volunteers for Development Abroad (BVDA).

== See also ==
- InterVol
