= Massena Memorial Hospital =

Defunct New York (state) hospital

Massena Memorial Hospital was an "upstate New York" hospital that was described as ""rural" and struggling" in 1987 and subsequently closed. Justification included "improvements in ambulance and helicopter transportation."

To serve local emergency needs, a medical facility, part of the St. Lawrence Health System, operates there, using the name Massena Hospital.

== History ==
Although the dedication for the original hospital was 1952. Plans had begun over a decade prior.

When it closed in 2019, St. Lawrence Health System absorbed it, as it had previously absorbed E.J. Noble Hospital and Canton-Potsdam Hospital.
