= Guild TV =

Guild Television
- Country: United Kingdom
- Affiliates: University of Birmingham; NaSTA
- Headquarters: University of Birmingham Guild of Students

Ownership
- Sister channels: BurnFM.com

History
- Launched: 1967

Guild Television (Guild TV or "GTV") Birmingham is the student television station of the University of Birmingham based at the Guild of Students. GTV is one of the oldest student TV stations in Britain and produces a variety of television programmes for the students at the University of Birmingham. These can be seen on-line or around its campus. GTV are affiliated with the National Student Television Association (NaSTA).

== History ==
Founded in 1967 as one of the oldest such stations in Britain, by 1996 it was producing Where is the News?, The Lunchbox, The Six-Thirty Show, Spotlight, Children's GTV and the annual Sabbatical Elections special since 1993. In 1999, GTV produced two programmes for a theme night on BBC Choice dedicated to student television; those programmes being Love in the Nineties, where students showed their views on love, and Walking with Students, a spoof of the BBC documentary Walking with Dinosaurs. In 2003, it launched e-GTV, which streamed a handful of its content on its website.

Guild TV had been considered "neglected and practically non-existant" until 2005, when the station was revitalised by Lucy Wilsher and Natasha Phelan. In 2007 it co-hosted the NaSTA conference with Warwick University's WTV and won an award for Bugs Brother 2006.

On 15 March 2016, it received new equipment to comply with European loudness standards. Guild TV received the most nominations at the 2017 NaSTA ceremony.
