= Canton-Potsdam Hospital =

New York (state) hospital

Coordinates: 44°40′36″N 74°58′56″W

- St. Lawrence Health System

Geography
- Location: Potsdam, New York, United States

Organization
- Type: General

Services
- Emergency department: Level III Trauma Center
- Beds: 94

History
- Opened: 1985

Links
- Lists: Hospitals in New York State

Canton-Potsdam Hospital is a 94-bed not-for-profit hospital located in Potsdam, New York, which is northeast of Canton the county seat of St. Lawrence. Their special services programs include inpatient detox and Center for Cancer Care.

== History ==
"The Canton-Potsdam Hospital Foundation was established in 1985" to help enlarge the existing hospital. Expansion included a $35 million building, erected in 2017, and a $6 million structure in 2018. Part of Canton-Potsdam's growth came from affiliations with other hospitals.

== St. Lawrence Health System ==
In 2013 Canton-Potsdam began a state-approved contractual arrangement to manage E.J. Noble Hospital, another New York hospital. The combination, which also brought recognition from union picketers, was named St. Lawrence Health System. This "new two-hospital system" subsequently expanded by adding Massena Memorial Hospital in 2019.

== E.J. Noble Hospital ==
"E.J. Noble Hospital opened its doors in 1952."
