= University of Birmingham Guild of Students =

British students' union

- Institution: University of Birmingham
- Location: Edgbaston Park Road, Edgbaston, Birmingham, United Kingdom
- Established: c. 1876
- President: Olly Ashton
- CEO: Joanne Elizabeth Thomas
- Sabbatical officers: International: Ahmed Sidahmed; Welfare and Community: Sumpa Abbey; Activities and Employability: Sean Ryan; Education: Jacob Dyke; Postgraduate: Dr Abhishikha Waghchoure; Sports: Abhijeet Patel
- Affiliations: National Union of Students, Aldwych Group, National Postgraduate Committee
- Website: www.guildofstudents.com

The University of Birmingham Guild of Students (previously Birmingham University Guild of Students; BUGS) is the officially recognised body that represents students at the University of Birmingham. The Guild functions as a students' union as per the Education Act 1994.

== History ==
The institution had its first foundations in the Mason Science College in the centre of Birmingham around 1876. The university itself formally received its Royal Charter in 1900, with the Guild of Students being provided for as a Student Representative Council. As a consequence, both the Guild and the university officially celebrated their centenaries in 2000. Mason College had had a union of sorts with a club house opening in Great Charles Street in 1905. The Guild of Students, having been provided for in the 1900 Charter, was formed in 1909 as the Guild of Undergraduates, being based at Edgbaston.

The Guild possesses archives that go back to the First World War, establishing a very long tradition of what is referred to as "modern Students' Unionism". Alongside Liverpool Guild of Students, the Guild was a founding member of the National Union of Students.

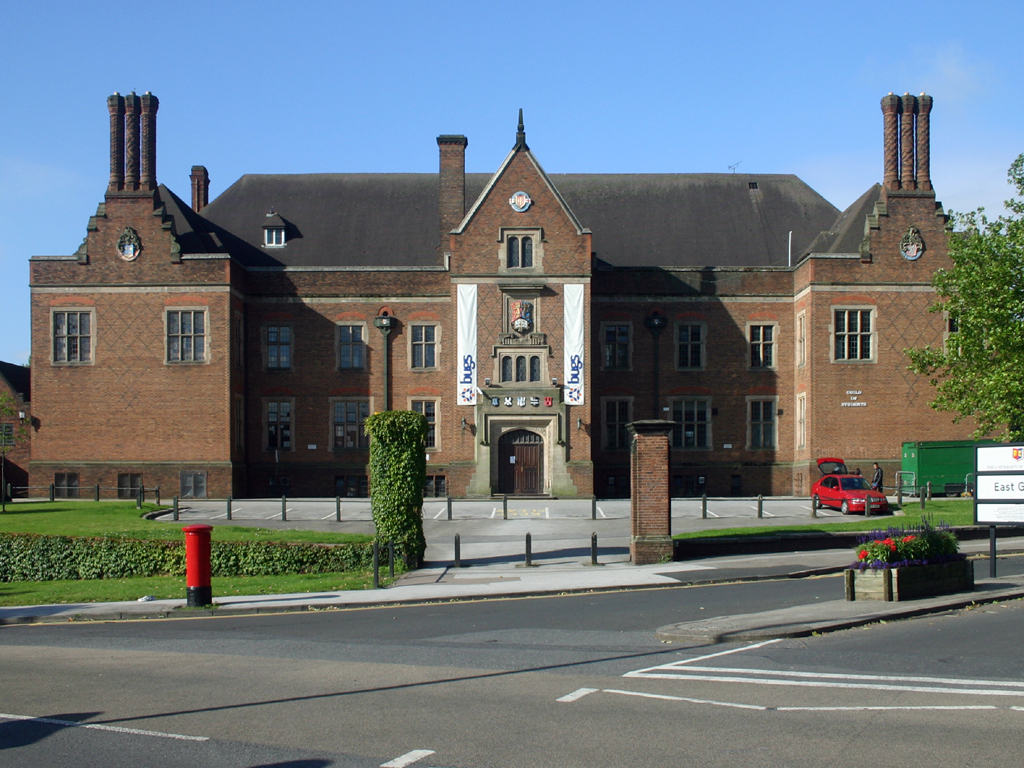
Guild building

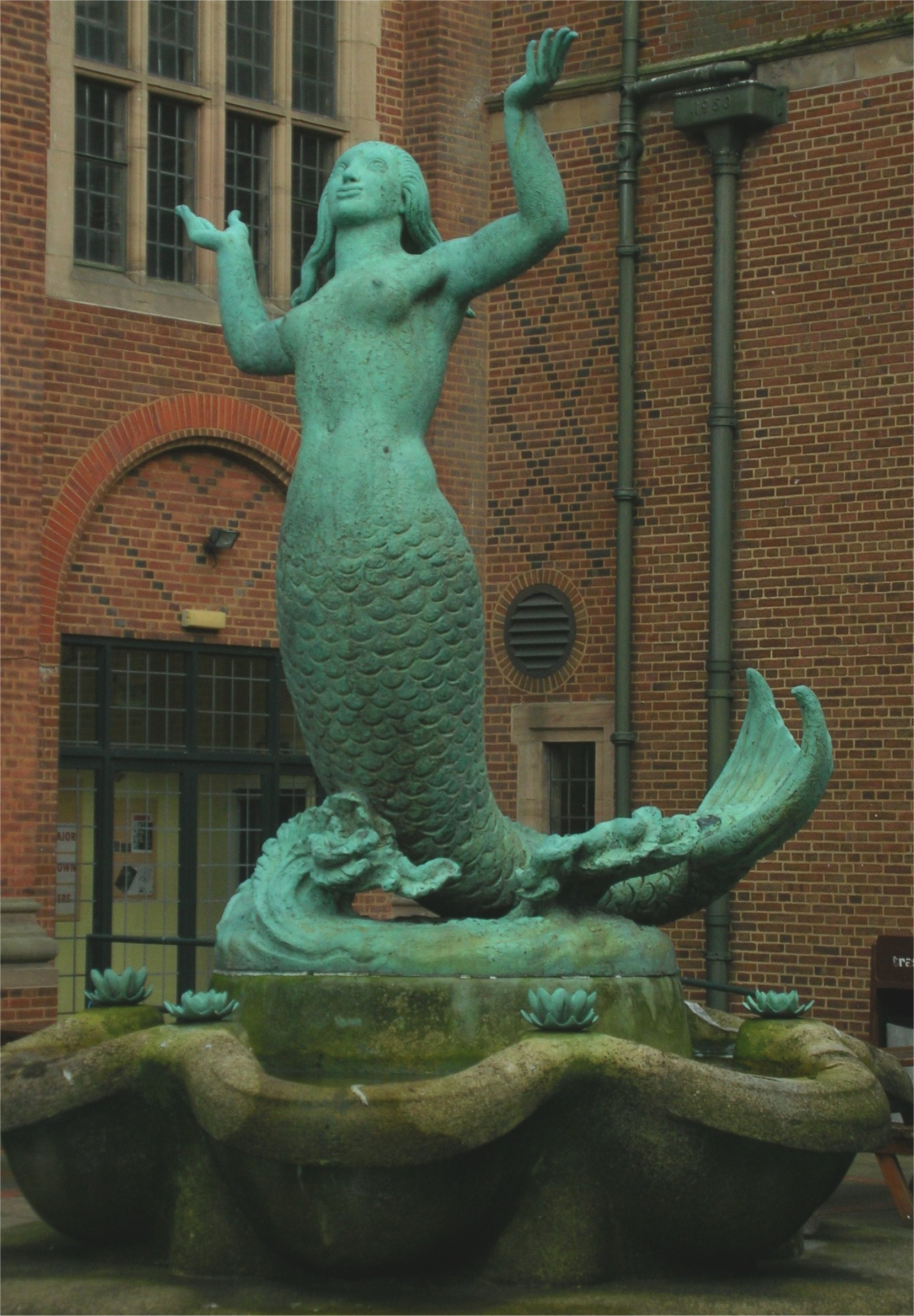
Bronze mermaid by William Bloye in the Guild courtyard

The Guild of Students occupies the Union Building (often referred to as just "the Guild"), situated at the edge of campus by the East Gate, for a peppercorn rent from the university. The building itself, by Holland W. Hobbiss, dates to 1928 and has been added to and amended, most significantly in the 1950s, when a south wing was added, and again in the 1960s, when a much larger west wing was built. At 10,000 square metres, it is one of the largest Student Union buildings in the UK.

It is not known for certain why the organisation is named "Guild of Students" as opposed to "Union of Students", in line with the vast majority of its English peers. It shares its name with five other student unions, including Liverpool Guild of Students and University of Exeter Students' Guild.

The Guild introduced new branding in 2007, intended to replace the previous "BUGS" brand, which had been adopted in 2000.

== Activities ==
The Guild provides representation to all students at the university and campaigns to create change on issues affecting students at a local and national level. This is achieved through regular meetings with University senior officers and managers, as well as through lobbying Birmingham City Council, the Government and other bodies. The Guild also runs campaigns focused on particular issues; campaigns have included a drive to see wheelie bins across the city, an initiative to improve campus security and have the university install CCTV across all halls of residence, and strong participation in the NUS campaign against the introduction of £3,000 top-up fees (a campaign that continues, despite the measure being approved by Parliament in January 2004).

The Guild boasts 24/7 welfare support channels for its members. Guild Advice provides professional and impartial advice on all manner of student issues, from academic problems, financial woes, immigration and other international troubles, housing worries, and employment rights. It also arranges individual representation for students facing academic appeals, disciplinary hearings and other procedures. All students in halls of residence can seek similar advice from their team of Student Mentors, who are on hand day or night for emergency issues, while Niteline provides a confidential listening and information service through telephone and email overnight. The Guild's welfare services are complemented by the Job Zone, which seeks and promotes part-time student vacancies, and the liberation associations.

With one of its three constitutional objects being to promote "social intercourse", the Guild maintains social space, bars and event nights; all of these provide an income, without which initiatives including campaigns, the ARC, Job Zone, Niteline and many student groups would struggle to exist. The major weekly night used to be Saturday's "Fab 'N' Fresh", with other popular events including "Very Important Tuesdays" (VIT), which have hosted acts such as Samantha Mumba, Wheatus and Cyndi Lauper, society-themed evenings such as "The Mix", student group events and irregular gigs and comedy evenings. More recently, however, Sports Night has become the more popular, with the Saturday Fabs being reserved for special occasions like Christmas, St Patricks Day, and Halloween.

The Guild finished a £4-million redevelopment in July 2010, with the ground floor of the building being completely overhauled, creating for the first time a dedicated membership area with all of the key services in one place. In addition, the brand new bar started serving food, and the Guild opened its very own letting agent, the SHAC.

Every November until 2019, the Guild hosted Birmingham's biggest free public fireworks display on the Vale Village on the Thursday closest to bonfire night. After several decades of continuous operation, this event did not return after the Coronavirus pandemic.

In November 2025, The University of Birmingham Guild of Students and Guild Services Limited entered into a franchise agreement with JD Wetherspoon to operate a food and drink operation within the building, to replace the existing ground floor bar and kitchen. This involved knocking through the old Mermaid Bar from Joe's and combining the two into one big room. The works began on or around the 18th March, with Joe's closing for the final time before the remodel on the 26th March, reopening on the 26th May.

=== Societies & volunteering ===
The Guild also supports more than 300 student groups and societies, actively promoting student involvement, volunteering and social participation. Its oldest society is Carnival, the Guild's charitable RAG (Raising And Giving) society, while one of its newest is Occult and Paranormal Society; all manner of groups, such as Fetish Society, Rock Music, Circus, InterVol (International Volunteers), Mountaineering, and Jazz and Blues, come in between.

The Guild's Activities and Employment Officer (AEO) has oversight of what can be published in the University's student-run newspaper, Redbrick, which won the Guardian Student Media Award for "Website of the Year" in 2011. It also has a radio station, Burn FM, which broadcasts online via its website during Autumn and Spring Terms, and Guild Television, the university's student TV station. All three media outlets are editorially independent and are encouraged to hold the Guild Executive to account. However, as the groups and the Executive are all part of the same organisation, the trustees reserve the right to edit content that poses legal or other risks to the Guild, which at times has caused friction amid claims of political censorship.

Birmingham's student guild has a particularly high number of drama societies, collectively referred to as "Guild Drama". These societies coexist within the space of the Guild, with different groups dedicated to classical theatre (Article 19), new writing and improv (Watch This Society For Original Theatre), pantomimes (Panto Society), musicals (Guild Musical Theatre Group), and stand-up comedy (The Birmingham Footnotes Comedy Society), to name a few. Each society produces roughly 1–2 shows per term, usually within the Guild itself, but occasionally branching out into site-specific performance within the university grounds. There have also been some instances of drama societies within The Guild staging productions at the Midlands Art Centre, the Edinburgh Fringe Festival and National Student Drama Festival.

The Guild has a Student Groups department, which hosts and supports a large variety of student-led societies and volunteering projects. Notable societies and projects include:

==== Computer Science Society ====
The Computer Science Society, often referred to as CSS, is the official Computer Science society at the University of Birmingham. The society has won two awards in 2017, namely the "Society of the Year" and "Outstanding Event" awards, and since then has also won the "Community Award" in 2019 and "The Great Achievement in EPS Award" in 2020.

The society was the second largest society in the 2024–2025 academic year, with 481 members as of March 2025, compared to the African & Caribbean society in first place with 547.

The society also actively encourages its members to improve their skills by making pull requests on their GitHub to make changes and improvements to the official website, giving members practice at using essential skills needed in the industry but not taught at the university. In addition to this, they also run hackathons that members can attend to learn new skills and meet new people. Most recently, this included the first ever iteration of BirmingHack, which saw students competing for top prizes, including one project which was subsequently published.

CSS also regularly host workshops to guide students through important information they will need to succeed in the industry. They work with the Google Developer Student Clubs in order to effectively deliver peer-to-peer learning of programming concepts and logic to ensure students are properly prepared for real-world problems. The School of Computer Science is one of the biggest schools at the university with 2,285 students enrolled in the 2023–2024 academic year.

==== ValeFest ====
ValeFest, also known as Vale Festival, is a one-day music festival organised entirely by student volunteers from the Guild of Students. The festival is Europe's largest student-run charity festival, and takes place annually on the Vale Village grounds. Since its inception in 2004, ValeFest has supported more than 20 different grassroots charities based in the UK and abroad, ranging from domestic abuse charities, to LGBTQ+ community organisations, to natural disaster relief efforts, to mental health charities. Some of these charities include Helen Bamber Foundation, Macmillan Cancer Support, Shelterbox UK and Birmingham Children's Hospital. In the time since the festival began, the society have raised roughly £200,000 for various charitable causes.

The event culminates with a headline act on the main stage. Previous headliners who have performed at the festival include: The Mouse Outfit, Fickle Friends and The Hunna.

==== Astronomical Society ====
The University of Birmingham Astronomical Society, generally known as AstroSoc, is the astronomical society of the University of Birmingham. It was formed on 2 March 1909, and is one of the oldest societies still running at the Guild of Students. The society meets weekly for general meetings, which include observing nights, talks and presentations. As of 2023, the society owns a large and diverse collection of telescopes, including a 12" Meade Lightbridge Dobsonian, a 10" Sky-watcher Dobsonian, and several smaller electronic go-to telescopes. It is also the custodian of the university's historic Cooke refractor, which was purchased in 1910 as a part of the original observatory on the Edgebaston campus and is now situated in a dome on top of the Poynting Building.

The society also runs programmes to improve the public understanding of astronomy. These include a series of public talks known as the Patrick Moore Lecture Series, Tea, Talk and Telescope. AstroSoc also participate in the university's Astronomy in the City events, which include astronomy and astrophysics talks, and the chance for the general public to observe the night sky.

In more recent years, it won the EPS (Engineering and Physical Sciences) societies Outreach Award in 2014, the Outstanding Event Award in 2018, and the Outreach Award for Continued Excellence in both 2019 and 2020.

==== InterVol ====
InterVol is a student volunteering charity that was founded at the Guild, notable for being the first Guild volunteering project or society to become a registered charity in the United Kingdom.

InterVol was set up as a society in 2003 by a group of students brought together by the Involve (now Student Development) department at the University of Birmingham Guild of Students. They ran their first volunteer placements in 2004.

InterVol focuses on student-led community volunteering projects that aim to make a long-term difference to children, communities and the environment, both locally and through placements overseas. InterVol works in close partnership with local NGOs for their overseas placements. InterVol became a registered charity in England and Wales in May 2010.

==== Debating Society ====
The University of Birmingham Debating Society is the largest debating society on campus; it practises debating in the British Parliamentary Style, as do other university debating societies, such as Oxford Union, Cambridge Union and Durham Union Society. The society runs weekly workshops and holds regular public debates, where anyone at the University of Birmingham can see guest speakers debate.

The society holds an annual Inter-Varsity competition and regularly competes in national and international Inter-Varsity debating competitions, such as the World Debating Championships.

== Governance ==
The Guild is a students' union for the purposes of the Education Act 1994. Under section 67 of the Act, all students of the university are by law automatically members of the Guild unless they deliberately opt out as per section 1.1 of Bye-Law 2.

The Guild's Articles of Association and Bye-Laws set out in detail how the organisation should be run.

In August 2008, the Guild moved from its previous model of an unincorporated association to become a charitable company limited by guarantee (CLG) and, as a result, a Trustee Board was established to provide guidance, expertise and strategic oversight of the Guild of Students. The Guild became a charity in 2010.

This decision was made following a Referendum that took place in February 2008 and was approved by more than 4,000 students, the Executive, Guild Council and the university. Key to the governance review was a need to clarify how decisions were made and by whom, especially in respect to the role of the Trustee Board and Guild Council.

The Trustees have ultimate responsibility for the day-to-day management of the Guild, which is delegated to the Chief Executive and Management Team. They ensure the Guild remains legally compliant and solvent, in accordance with Memorandum and Articles of Association, the By-laws and Guidance and Strategy documents. In the past, when it had far fewer members than today, this group of trustees was the Guild Council. The Trustee Board is now made up of seven Sabbatical (Officer) Trustees; four Student Trustees, with one undergraduate, one postgraduate, one BAME and one international student; and seven external trustees, one of whom is a nominee from the university.

=== Executive ===
Below the trustee board is the Senior Management Team (SMT). These are the CEO, Director of Finance, Director of Engagement, Director of Operations, and Director of Community and Representation.

The Guild Officer Group (GOG) also sits below the trustee board. The GOG is made up of all full-time and part-time elected officers of the Guild. The part-time officers are: Disabled Students' Officer, Sustainability Officer, Ethnic Minority Students' Officer, Lesbian, Gay, Bisexual, Trans and Queer+ (LGBTQ+) Students' Officer, Trans and Non-Binary Students' Officer and the Women's Officer.

== Finances ==
The Guild has an annual turnover of approximately £7.3 million.

A large portion of that money is the block grant, an annual sum of money from the university. For 2023–2024, this was £3.4 million, equivalent to approximately £90 per student. The Guild also receives money for the performance of several service contracts. One of the most significant of these is the £350,000 for the Student Mentor Scheme, equivalent to £75 per hall resident. The Residence Associations also receive grants from the university equal to £100 per hall resident.

Most of the rest of the Guild's turnover is through its venues' trading activity.

In the 2022–2023 financial year, there was one staff member paid between £90,000 and £99,999, with two staff members paid between £60,000 and £69,999.

=== University Audit ===
In 2023, the University of Birmingham undertook an audit of the Guild's financial procedures. While not originally made publicly available, it was eventually disclosed as part of a request made under the Freedom of Information Act. The audit describes four key risks the University determined to be germane.

The audit also described four recommendations to be made to improve the integrity of the Guild's financial procedures.

== Media controversy ==
Over the 2005–2006 academic session, the Guild made national and international press over several controversial issues.

The year started with President Richard Angell banning the National Blood Service from the Guild's popular Freshers' Fair over the service's policy of banning gay and bisexual men from giving blood for life. This policy remained in effect until it was overturned at the start of the 2009–2010 academic year.

In January 2006, a row erupted as the Guild became aware of and subsequently took issue with some of the policies sought by its Evangelical Christian Union society. The Union sought not to allow non-Christians to become members, have the outgoing leaders appoint new leaders (rather than have the members elect them), and require members to sign an evangelical doctrinal quasi-contract. Although the Union later agreed to hold elections, the Union members felt that their religious beliefs prevented them from being able to make any more concessions. The Guild stated that they believed the law prevented them from accommodating the society, as student unions are required to make all of their activities available to all students. The Christian Union stated that they believed they were being deprived of their legal rights. Guild Council ultimately derecognised the society, although it was subsequently re-admitted to the Guild in 2013.

At Guild Council in June 2006, President Richard Angell proposed a motion titled "Ding Dong the Witch is Dead" that the Guild should "have a party" on the occasion of former Prime Minister Margaret Thatcher's death, which was met with widespread criticism, even making The Times.

In 2013, the Guild joined several other University unions in banning the song Blurred Lines by Robin Thicke from being played at club night Fab'N'Fresh. The boycott of the song was prompted by media outcry over the sexually explicit lyrics, which many deemed misogynistic and apologist regarding rape culture.

In 2019, a pro-life society within The Guild was established, which was founded by students advocating for the outlawing of abortion in the UK. This sparked debate amongst students about whether or not opinions on civil rights should be allowed as a basis for a society. In retaliation, a pro-choice society was quickly established to provide a group for students who advocate for the protection safe and legal abortion practices. Subsequently, a motion to make the Guild a pro-choice institution was submitted and approved. Due to an administrative error, the original motion is no longer available, but the updated version that was re-passed in 2025 remains online.

In 2023, the Guild was publicly criticised for its security and events management practices after an incident during a club night left multiple students with serious injuries following a crush in the Guild's Underground events space, where Dick and Dom were performing. This information was publicly released on Redbrick website, the official student publication of the University. The article was "an ongoing process" for four months until it was able to be published. In an article published by some members of the 2025–2026 Committee, excessive bureaucracy proofing procedures and Guild hesitation against the publishing of interviews with a security guard and a victim of the crush are implied reasons for the delay.

In September 2023, Joe's Bar in the Guild was given a temporary "two" food hygiene rating, pending re-inspection, which later raised the rating to a "five". The inspection report was provided following a Freedom of Information request. The report listed several reasons for the rating, specifically that the premises were not visibly clean, that the touchpoints had not been suitably cleaned/disinfected, food had not been properly dated, and insufficient hand washing. The report also noted that allergy information was provided via QR code, but that when tested, the QR code did not work. Following this, a schedule of works was created, listing several actions that the Guild would need to take to improve their rating. Following re-inspection a month later in October 2023, a few minor items were listed as continuing to require attention, but generally remarked that the venue had made significant improvements. Despite this, in February 2025, the council received a complaint about the Guild, claiming poor personal hygiene of staff (lack of hand washing) and unsafe food handling practices (food out of temperature control, cold food, food being reheated after being left at room temperature). The council chose not to perform an inspection regarding this complaint, but noted that they may choose to do so if further complaints were received.
