= Cate's Brother =

2022 single by Maisie Peters

Single by Maisie Peters
- Released: 6 May 2022
- Recorded: February 2022
- Genre: Pop-punk; arena rock; pop rock
- Length: 3:01
- Label: Gingerbread Man
- Songwriters: Maisie Peters; Max Grahn
- Producer: Fat Max Gsus

Maisie Peters singles chronology
"Brooklyn" (2021)	"Cate's Brother" (2022)	"Blonde" (2022)

Music video
- "Cate's Brother" on YouTube

"Cate's Brother" is a song by British singer-songwriter Maisie Peters, released on 6 May 2022 as a stand-alone single. It is Peters' highest-charting single in the Republic of Ireland, reaching number 29 in the chart.

== History ==
Peters has stated that the song, which is about an ultimately fictional relationship with her real life close friend Cate Canning's brother, started out as a inside joke amongst her friendship group after she met Cate's brother at a party and found him attractive. Peters posted snippets of the song onto TikTok for fun, the first of which was uploaded on 25 February 2022. After a positive fan reaction to the first snippet, which was viewed over 10 million times, she posted further developments of the song onto TikTok, before eventually announcing an official single release of the song on 6 May.

An acoustic version of the song featuring Matt Maltese, known as "Cate's Brother (Matt's Version)" in reference to the titles of remastered albums by Peters' primary musical influence Taylor Swift, was released onto streaming platforms on 1 June 2022.

== Composition and lyrics ==
"Cate's Brother" has been described as pop-punk, arena rock and pop rock; Peters stated that she wrote the song on a trip to Stockholm at a time where she "was revisiting a lot of the pop-punk music I grew up listening to", such as My Chemical Romance, Fall Out Boy and All Time Low as well as other rock influences like Arctic Monkeys.

Lyrically, the song is written about a largely-fictional romantic relationship between Peters and the Canadian brother of her real-life close friend and fellow singer-songwriter Cate Canning, whom she met at a Halloween party hosted by Peters in 2021. In the song, after being introduced to each other by Canning at the party, Peters and Cate's brother go on cinema dates, party together and make out, before Peters questions whether the relationship will work out after Cate's brother returns home to Canada due to its long-distance nature. The song's final chorus closes with Cate's brother's reassurances that Peters can join him in Canada and meet his parents, concluding with the line "and now I date Cate's brother".

Both compositionally and lyrically, "Cate's Brother" has been compared to "Stacy's Mom" by Fountains of Wayne, "Sk8er Boi" by Avril Lavigne and "Teenage Dirtbag" by Wheatus.

== Personnel ==
Credits adapted from Tidal.

- Maisie Peters – composition, vocals
- Max Grahn – composition
- Fat Max Gsus – production, bass guitar, drums, guitar, percussion, synthesiser, programming
- Randy Merrill – mastering
- Serban Ghenea – mixing
- Bryce Bordone – assistant mixer

== Charts ==
Chart performance for "Cate's Brother"
Chart (2022)	Peak position
Ireland (IRMA)	29
New Zealand Hot Singles (Recorded Music NZ)	30
UK Singles (Official Charts)	62

== Release history ==
Release dates and formats for "Cate's Brother"
Region	Date	Format	Label	Ref.
Various	6 May 2022	Digital download; streaming	Gingerbread Man	
