= Psycho (Maisie Peters song) =

2021 single by Maisie Peters

Single by Maisie Peters

from the album You Signed Up for This
- Released: 2 July 2021
- Length: 3:05
- Label: Gingerbread Man
- Songwriters: Ed Sheeran; Steve Mac; Maisie Peters
- Producer: Steve Mac

Maisie Peters singles chronology
"Funeral" (2021)	"Psycho" (2021)	"You Signed Up for This / Brooklyn" (2021)

Music video
- "Psycho" on YouTube

"Psycho" is a song by British singer-songwriter Maisie Peters, released on 2 July 2021 through Gingerbread Man Records as the second single from her debut studio album You Signed Up for This.

== Reception ==
The song has received praise for its "smarter" and light-hearted approach of the term "psycho"; this is in stark contrast to Ava Max's 2018 song "Sweet but Psycho" which attracted criticism from several mental health advocates for stigmatizing mental illnesses.

== Credits and personnel ==
Credits adapted from Tidal

- Maisie Peters – vocals, songwriting
- Steve Mac – songwriting, production, keyboards
- Ed Sheeran – songwriting, additional backing vocals
- Chris Laws – engineering, drums
- Tim Laws – electric guitar
- Dan Pursey – engineering
- Stuart Hawkes – mastering
- Mark "Spike" Stent – mixing
- Matt Wolach – mixing assistance

== Charts ==
Chart performance for "Psycho"
Chart (2021)	Peak position
Ireland (IRMA)	81
Japan Hot 100 (Billboard Japan)	87
New Zealand Hot Singles (Recorded Music NZ)	20
UK Singles (OCC)	57

== Certifications ==
Region	Certification	Certified units/sales
United Kingdom (BPI)	Silver	200,000^{‡}
^{‡} Sales+streaming figures based on certification alone.

== Release history ==
Release dates and formats for "Psycho"
Region	Date	Format	Label	Ref.
Various	1 July 2021	Digital download; streaming	Gingerbread Man	
