= Henry Foster (doctor) =

American obstetrician (1933–2022)

- Born: Henry Wendell Foster Jr. September 8, 1933 Pine Bluff, Arkansas, U.S.
- Died: September 25, 2022 (aged 89) Pasadena, California, U.S.
- Occupation: Obstetrician
- Education: Morehouse College (BS); University of Arkansas School of Medicine
- Spouse: St. Clair (Sandy) Anderson (m. 1960)

Henry Foster Jr. (September 8, 1933 – September 25, 2022) was an American obstetrician who was a professor emeritus and dean of the School of Medicine at Meharry Medical College in the United States. He was also clinical professor of obstetrics and gynecology at Vanderbilt University.

== Education ==
Foster received six honorary doctorate degrees. He was a graduate of Morehouse College in Atlanta, Georgia, where he was initiated into the Pi chapter of Kappa Alpha Psi fraternity.

== Career ==
Foster worked as an obstetrician in Tennessee. Foster produced more than 250 publications and abstracts as well as contributed chapters to textbooks. He wrote a book titled Make a Difference. Foster wrote an autobiography in 1997 titled Make a Difference: the Founder of the 'I Have a Future Program' Shares His Vision for Young America.

Foster was the immediate past chair of the U.S. Committee for the United Nations Population Fund, and the immediate past chair of the board of directors for Pathfinder International. He previously served two terms as chair of the board of regents of the United States National Library of Medicine.

== Clinton administration ==
Foster came to national prominence after he served as U.S. President Bill Clinton's senior advisor on teenage pregnancy reduction and youth issues. Clinton nominated him for the post of Surgeon General of the United States in 1995 to fill the void left by departing Surgeon General Jocelyn Elders. Foster garnered substantial controversy during Senate hearings in February 1995 when he admitted that he had performed abortions as an obstetrician-gynecologist. Foster was also accused of being involved with forced sterilizations during the Tuskegee syphilis experiment; he sharply denied involvement although he acknowledged he was employed by the university during the final period of the experiments. When asked how many abortions he had performed, he initially replied that it had been few, but later stated the number was likely several dozen. Opponents accused him of dishonesty and lack of candor, while he defended himself by stating that he could not make a spur of the moment specific recollection without examining his records. Foster faced significant opposition in the Senate, mostly by anti-abortion Republicans. Foster's nomination was successfully filibustered by Senator Phil Gramm, who was seeking the presidential nomination in the 1996 Republican Party presidential primaries at the time. The nomination received only 57 votes to proceed to a chamber vote, when 60 of the 100 were required. Clinton withdrew the nomination on June 22.

== Death ==
Foster died in Pasadena, California on September 25, 2022, at the age of 89.
