= InterVol =

UK charity

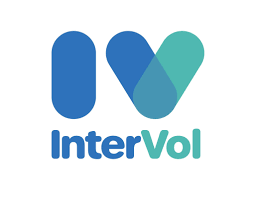
- InterVol's logo since 2024
- Formation: 2003
- Registration no.: 1136099
- Purpose: Volunteering
- Location: Birmingham, Manchester, Norwich, London, United Kingdom
- Origins: University of Birmingham
- Region served: Ecuador, France, India, Nepal, United Kingdom
- Method: Conservation, Refugee support & Education
- Volunteers: ~100
- Website: intervol.org.uk

InterVol is a student volunteering charity based in the United Kingdom. InterVol support community volunteering around university campuses in the United Kingdom, as well as connecting students with overseas volunteering opportunities. The charity has student groups at the University of Birmingham, University of Manchester, University of East Anglia, University of Nottingham, and SOAS University of London.

== History ==
=== Formation ===
InterVol was set up as a voluntary project in late 2003 by a group of students with the support of the University of Birmingham Guild of Students. InterVol's volunteers began a system of student-led sustainable development projects, aiming to make a long term difference to communities in developing countries whilst working in close partnership with local NGOs in each country, as well as running volunteering projects, training sessions, and events on their own campus and in the local community.

=== Projects and expansion ===
In the summer of 2004 InterVol led three volunteering projects to Bulgaria, Cambodia and Uganda. The volunteers were involved in work including AIDS awareness training, work in children's centres, teaching English, and building the information technology capacity of local staff.

In 2005 the project roster increased to eight projects as the popularity and presence of the project on the University of Birmingham campus increased significantly. There were two new projects in Ecuador, based around cloud-forest conservation and social development, as well as a community development project in Accra, Ghana, a teaching project in Poland and a social development project in South Africa.

In 2006 previous projects were maintained while a new coastal development project in Thailand with Andaman Discoveries began in response to the Boxing Day Tsunami. InterVol supported volunteers to renovate facilities and coach sport at the New Future for Children centre in Phnom Penh, Cambodia, for the first time in July 2006. InterVol received its first national awards in 2006 when two founding volunteers, John Gorski and Danielle Gerson, won Impact awards at the National Year of the Volunteer Awards.

In 2007 a new project to construct school buildings and teach in rural Nepal commenced. This year also saw InterVol send volunteers to both a trafficked animal refuge and to teach Spanish to members of the Huaorani in Ecuador. The following year another project was set up in Kenya, a sports-based development project in Nairobi's Kibera slum.

A group formed at Oxford Brookes in 2018, supporting education organisations in rural Nepal. An InterVol committee formed at SOAS University of London in 2023.

== Charity status ==
Initially founded in 2003 as an initiative of the University of Birmingham Guild of Students, InterVol was a volunteering project within an exempt charity. InterVol became an independent registered charity in England and Wales in May 2010. InterVol's charitable objectives are to act as a resource for student volunteers at universities in the United Kingdom while promoting voluntary projects that focus on education, health, conservation, and the relief of poverty.

== Placement locations ==
InterVol currently support community organisations through voluntary placements in the following countries: Ecuador, France (Calais), India, and Nepal. Volunteers gain relevant experience through volunteering with local charities in their university communities in England before travelling overseas.

== See also ==
- Andaman Discoveries
- Edinburgh Global Partnerships
- University of Birmingham Guild of Students
- Imperial College Union
- Lancaster University
- University of Nottingham Students' Union
