= E.J. Noble Hospital =

Defunct New York (state) hospital(s)

E.J. Noble Hospital is one of a series of names used by three medical facilities in New York (state) that have since become part of St. Lawrence Health System. These facilities, and a foundation, are named after Edward John Noble.

== History ==
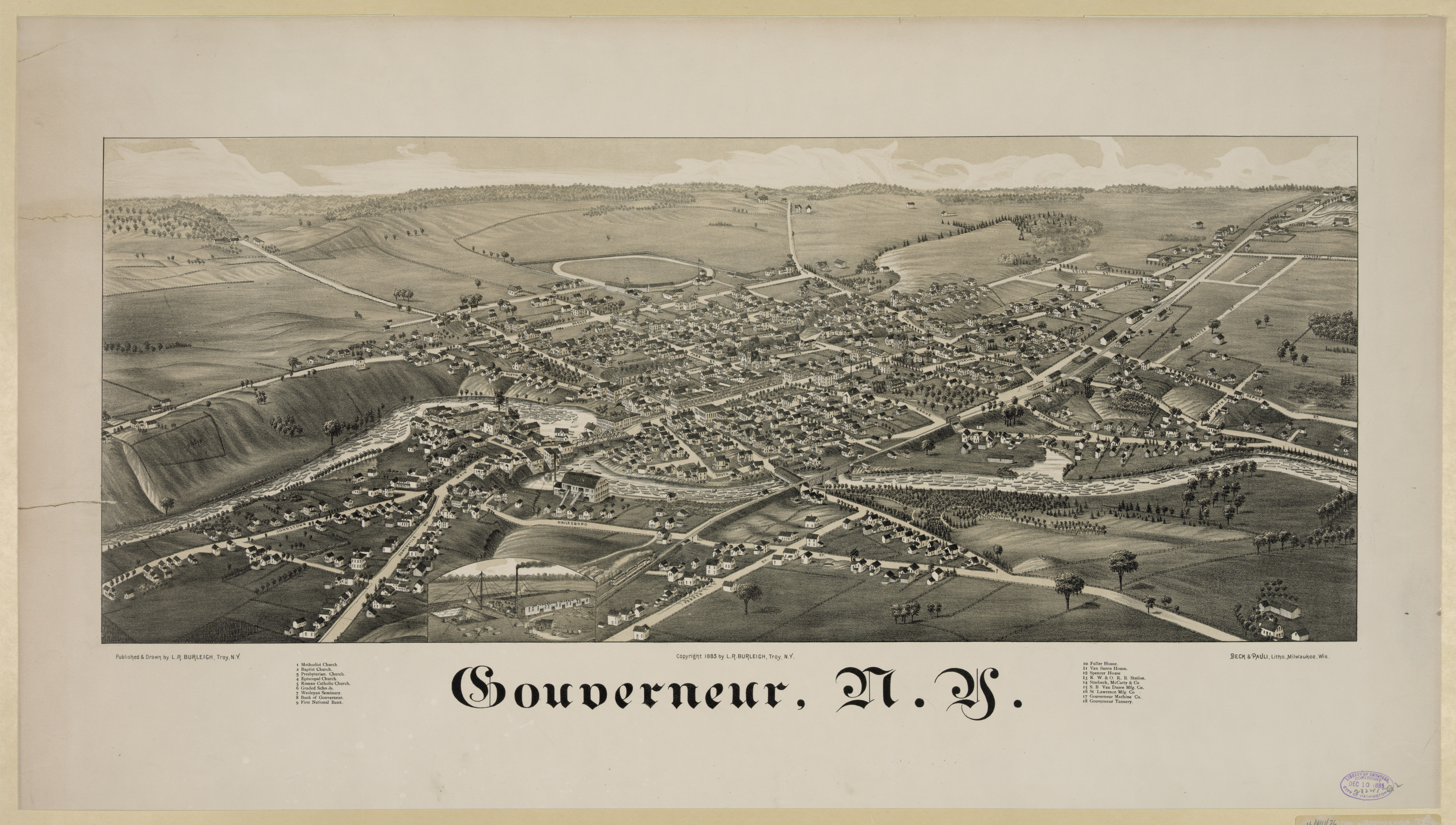
Lithograph of Gouverneur, New York from 1885 by L.R. Burleigh with list of church landmarks

E.J. Noble Hospital opened its doors in 1952" in Canton. When this location closed as a hospital, its name was EJ Noble of Canton.

A second Noble Hospital location was in Alexandria Bay, and its names had included Edward John Noble Samaritan.

A third was the Noble hospital in Gouverneur, New York.

A New York State database lists these hospitals as closed, yet as of 2020, the above are still operating under the St. Laurence/EJ Noble/Gouverneur names as medical facilities/doctor offices. Kinney Nursing Home is part of the EJ Noble facilities.

The American Hospital Directory shows only the following certified hospitals: Gouverneur Hospital in Gouverneur, River Hospital in Alexandria Bay, and Canton-Potsdam Hospital in Potsdam.

=== E.J. Noble Samaritan ===
During the 2010s, when Noble had some financial difficulties, Samaritan Medical Center was supervising some of their units, and the name E.J. Noble Samaritan was temporarily used for Noble.
