= Rochester General Hospital =

Coordinates: 43°11′32″N 77°35′11″W

- Rochester Regional Health
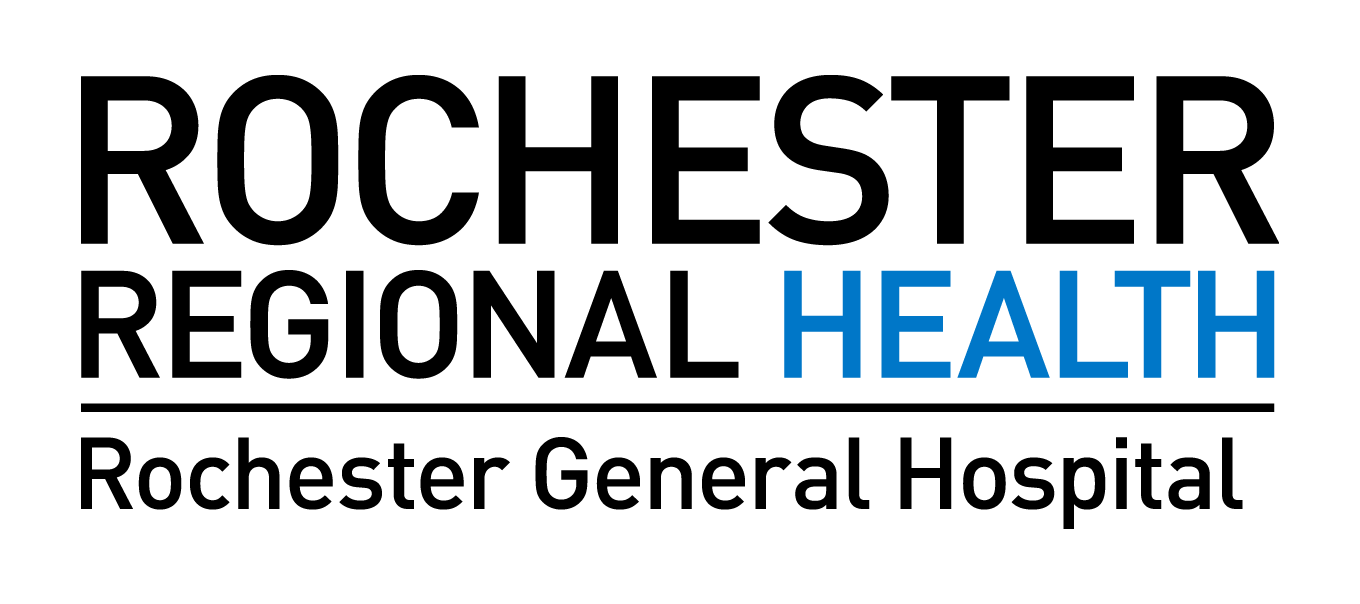

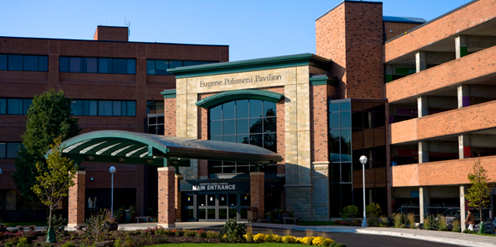

Geography
- Location: 1425 Portland Ave, Rochester, New York, United States

Organization
- Care system: Private
- Type: Teaching
- Affiliated university: Cleveland Clinic and Roswell Park Comprehensive Cancer Center

Services
- Standards: JCAHO accreditation Magnet status
- Beds: 528
- Speciality: Multispecialty

Helipads
- Helipad: Yes

History
- Opened: 1847

Links
- Website: www.rochesterregional.org/locations/hospitals/rochester-general-hospital/
- Lists: Hospitals in New York State
- Other links: List of hospitals in the United States

Rochester General Hospital, an affiliate hospital of Rochester Regional Health, is a 528-bed tertiary care hospital, located in Rochester, New York. Rochester General Hospital has been serving the residents of the Rochester Region and beyond since 1847. Rochester General Hospital offers primary medical care and a broad range of specialties. Rochester General Hospital's medical staff includes over 1,000 primary care physicians and specialists, many of whom have offices at the hospital and throughout the community.

== History ==
Chartered in 1847 and established in 1864, the Rochester City Hospital opened during the last years of the American Civil War on a plot of land on West Main Street bounded by Reynolds, Troup and Van Auker Streets, and had been the site of West Cemetery. Along with St. Mary's hospital that was designated as a U.S. Army General Hospital, the City Hospital's first major challenge was the treatment of 448 Union soldiers in the next two years. In the post-war years, the Hospital rapidly grew, embracing the advancement of medical technology, and becoming a leader in surgery and nursing. The Rochester City Hospital School of Nursing was established in 1880 and became the 12th nursing training program in the nation and the 3rd in New York State. Many graduates from the school would later have distinguished careers in nursing and as administrators and physicians.

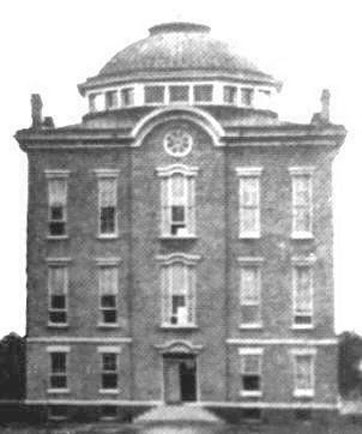
Rochester City Hospital in 1864.

To reflect its all-encompassing mission, the hospital's name changed to Rochester General Hospital in 1911. In the early years of the twentieth-century members of the medical staff responded to the Spanish influenza epidemic of 1918-1919 and became the nucleus of the organized military hospitals, Base Hospital 19 in the First World War and the 19th General Hospital later on in Second World War.

The post-Second World War years reflected a period of rapid growth and technological advancement. The hospital led the region by opening the first Premature Infant Nursery in Western New York in 1951. The absence of a hospital in the northern sections of the city prompted the establishment in 1956 of the new Rochester General Hospital Northside campus on Portland Avenue and Ridge Road East on land purchased from the Buell Farm. While maintaining both the new “Northside” campus and the original, now designated “Westside” campus, the hospital continued to embrace the leading advancements in medical technology. The Westside campus closed in 1966, leaving Northside as the Rochester General Hospital.

The forerunner to the present Rochester Heart Institute, the Cardio-Pulmonary Laboratory opened in 1959 and installed the first pacemaker in 1963 closely followed by the first open-heart surgery the following year.

Through the 1970s and 1980s the hospital continued to expand to serve the needs of the community. In response to evolving health care industry in 1984, Rochester General Hospital, along with its affiliates, combined with the Genesee Hospital, Newark-Wayne Community Hospital, and the Continuing Care Network to form the Greater Rochester Health system (GRHS.)

In 1997 the Rochester General Hospital celebrated its 150th anniversary. This year also saw the system change its name to ViaHealth, which comprised the Rochester General Hospital, The Genesee Hospital, Newark-Wayne Community Hospital, The Behavioral Health Network and the Continuing Care network of long-term care providers.

The organization again changed its branding name from Viahealth to the Rochester General Health System in 2008 to closer reflect its long history of commitment and service to the Rochester community.

== Services ==
- Bariatric Surgery
- Breast Center
- Cancer
- Cardiology
- Cardiothoracic Surgery
- Childbirth
- Dentistry
- Emergency Medicine
- Joint Replacement
- Ophthalmology
- Orthopaedic Surgery
- Pediatrics
- Residency Training Programs
- Stroke Center

== Facilities and current operations ==
Rochester General Hospital has 528 beds and is served by more than 1,500 medical and dental staff members and more than 7,500 employees. In 2010, RGH cared for more than 100,000 patients in the emergency department, discharged over 32,356 inpatients, and performed more than 15,300 surgical procedures and over 1,159,000 outpatient encounters.

The hospital contains a Dunkin Donuts, a Subway sandwich shop, and a Wolfgang Puck cafe.

=== Sands-Constellation Center for Critical Care ===
Rochester General Hospital is currently constructing a 7-story, 312,000 square foot critical-care building, that will include 23 operating rooms, 128 private-acuity-adaptable patient rooms, and 14 special care nursery rooms. Rochester General received its largest gift in the hospital's history from Robert Sands of Constellation Brands. Upon approval from the State of New York, the facility is projected to be completed in late 2021.

== Hospital rating data ==
The HealthGrades website contains the clinical quality data for the Rochester General Hospital, as of 2017. For this rating section three different types of data from HealthGrades are presented: clinical quality ratings for thirty-nine inpatient conditions and procedures, thirteen patient safety indicators and the percentage of patients giving the hospital as a 9 or 10 (the two highest possible ratings).

For inpatient conditions and procedures, there are three possible ratings: worse than expected, as expected, better than expected. For this hospital the data for this category is:

- Worse than expected - 9
- As expected - 13
- Better than expected - 17

For patient safety indicators, there are the same three possible ratings. For this hospital safety indicators were rated as:

- Worse than expected - 1
- As expected - 8
- Better than expected - 4

Percentage of patients rating this hospital as a 9 or 10 - 69% Percentage of patients who on average rank hospitals as a 9 or 10 - 69%
