= Highland Hospital (Rochester, New York) =

Geography
- Location: Rochester, New York, United States
- Coordinates: 43.13537°N 77.60604°W

Organization
- Affiliated university: University of Rochester Medicine

Services
- Beds: 261

History
- Opened: 1889

Links
- Lists: Hospitals in New York State

Highland Hospital is located in Rochester, New York, and is an affiliate of University of Rochester Medicine, which is part of University of Rochester.

Founded in 1889, the hospital is involved in specialties such as bariatric surgery, joint replacement, geriatric care, women's services and maternity. The organization has 261 beds and 2,400 employees.
