= James Frederick Wood =

First Archbishop of Philadelphia

The Most Reverend James Frederick Bryan Wood
- Archbishop of Philadelphia
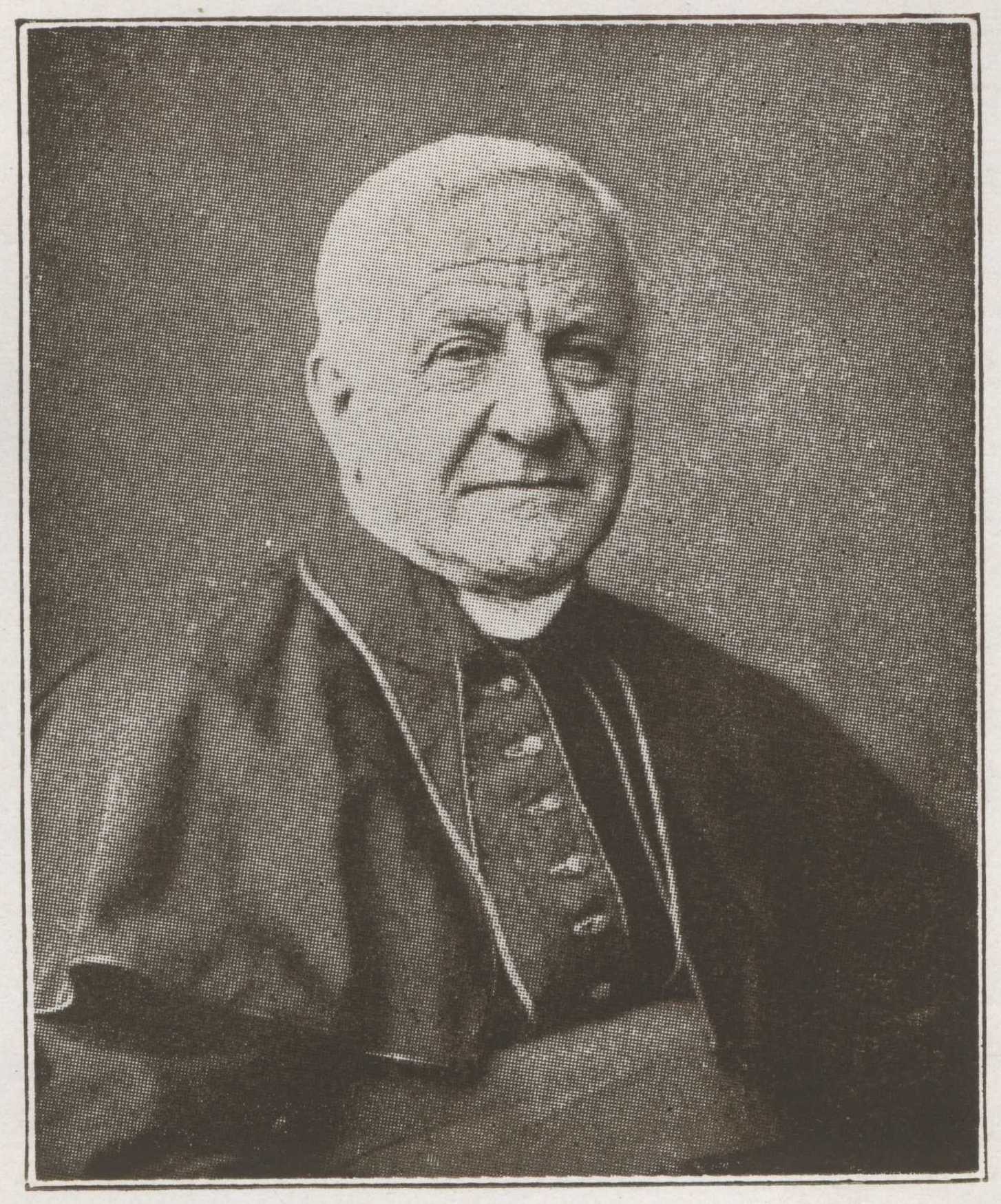
- Diocese: Philadelphia
- See: Philadelphia
- Installed: January 5, 1860
- Term ended: June 20, 1883
- Predecessor: John Neumann, C.SS.R.
- Successor: Patrick John Ryan
- Other post: Coadjutor Bishop of Philadelphia (1857–1860)

Orders
- Ordination: March 25, 1844
- Consecration: April 26, 1857

Personal details
- Born: April 27, 1813 Philadelphia, Pennsylvania
- Died: June 20, 1883 (aged 70) Philadelphia, Pennsylvania

James Frederick Bryan Wood (April 27, 1813 – June 20, 1883) was an American prelate of the Roman Catholic Church. He was the fifth Bishop and first Archbishop of Philadelphia, serving between 1860 and his death in 1883.

== Early life ==
James Wood was born in Philadelphia, Pennsylvania. His parents were both from England, his father (a merchant) from Manchester and his mother from Gloucestershire; they immigrated to the United States in 1809. His father had him baptized by a Unitarian minister.

After attending an elementary school on Dock Street, he was sent abroad to the Crypt School at Gloucester in November 1821. He returned to Philadelphia five years later and then enrolled at a private school on Market Street. In November 1827, he and his family removed to Cincinnati, Ohio, where the young Wood became a clerk at the Branch Bank of the United States. After being advanced to individual book-keeper and discount clerk, he was made a paying and receiving teller (1833) and cashier (1836) in the Franklin Bank of Cincinnati.

=== Conversion and ordination ===
Wood also developed a friendship with Bishop John Baptist Purcell, who later baptized him into the Catholic Church on April 7, 1836. Deciding to enter the priesthood, he resigned as cashier at Franklin Bank in September 1837 and went to Rome for his studies the following October. After spending a few months at the Pontifical Irish College under Paul Cullen (later Paul Cardinal Cullen), he studied at the College of the Propaganda for seven years, also becoming prefect of discipline there. Wood was ordained a priest by Cardinal Giacomo Filippo Fransoni on March 25, 1844. Upon his return to the Diocese of Cincinnati in October 1844, he served as a curate at the Cathedral of St. Peter in Chains until 1854, when he became pastor of St. Patrick's Church in Cincinnati.

== Episcopal ministry ==
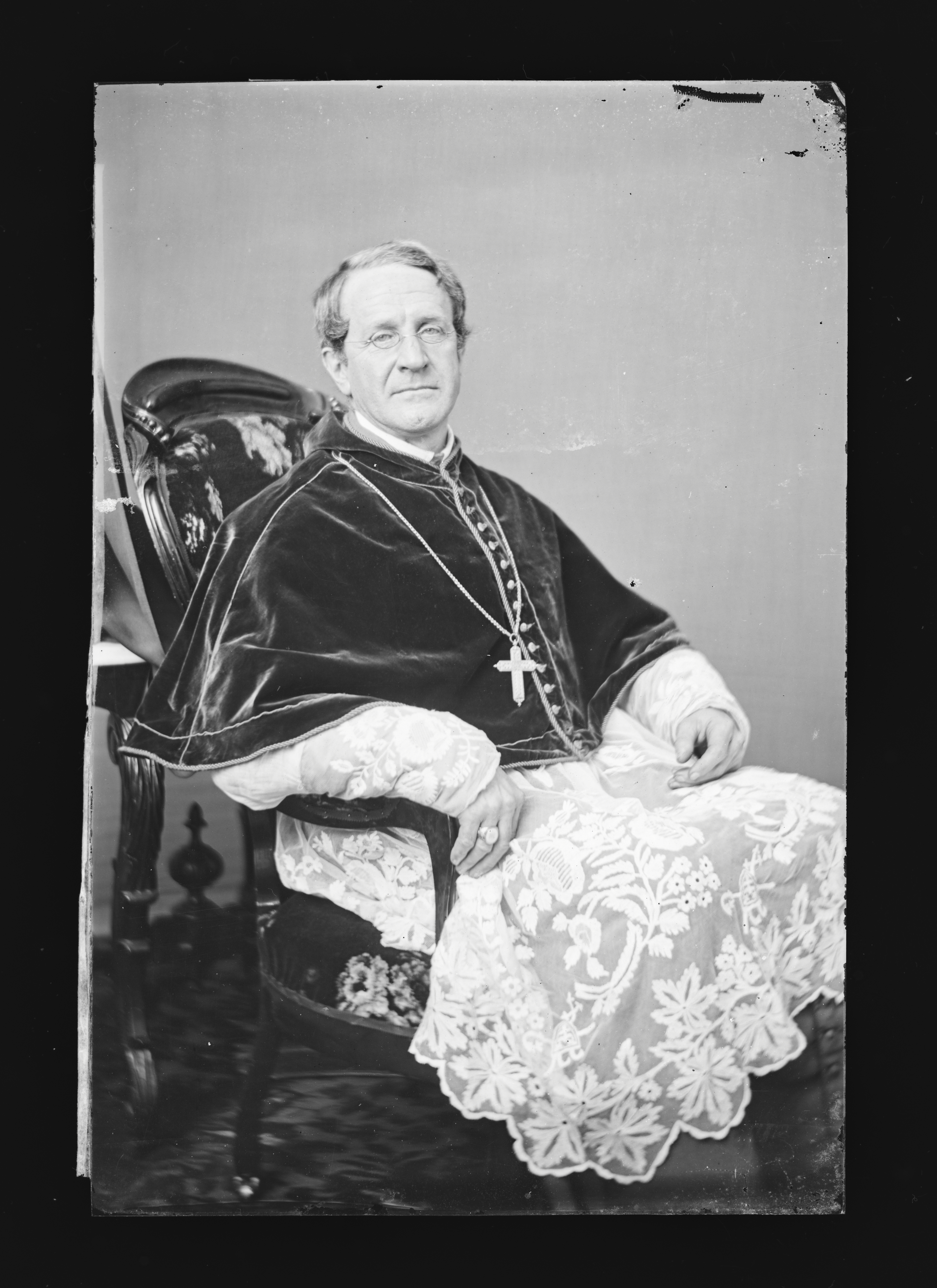
Photographic portrait of James Frederick Wood, 27 Apr 1813 - 20 Jun 1883

=== Coadjutor Bishop of Philadelphia ===
On January 9, 1857, Wood was appointed Coadjutor Bishop of Philadelphia and Titular Bishop of Antigonea by Pope Pius IX. He received his episcopal consecration on the following April 26 from Archbishop Purcell, with Bishops John Neumann, C.SS.R. (later a Saint), and Richard Vincent Whelan serving as co-consecrators. After arriving in Philadelphia, he took charge of the financial affairs of the diocese and established the cathedral parish.

=== Fifth Bishop of Philadelphia ===
Wood later succeeded Neumann as the fifth Bishop of Philadelphia upon the latter's death on January 5, 1860. At the time of his succession, the diocese (which included the entire states of Pennsylvania and Delaware in addition to western New Jersey) included 200,000 Catholics, 137 priests, 131 parishes, 17 chapels and missions, 40 parish schools with 8,710 pupils, four colleges and four academies. The erection of the Cathedral of Sts. Peter and Paul came to a brief halt with the outbreak of the Civil War, but was later dedicated by Wood on November 20, 1864. In 1865 he purchased a large tract of land in Overbrook, on the outskirts of Philadelphia, for the new St. Charles Borromeo Seminary, the cornerstone of which was laid on April 4, 1866. The seminary was opened in September 1871 with 128 students. He was named an Assistant at the Pontifical Throne in 1862.

Wood established the Catholic Home for Destitute Orphan Girls, enlarged St. Vincent's Home and founded a convent for the Sisters of the Good Shepherd. He also introduced into the diocese the Little Sisters of the Poor, Servant Sisters of the Immaculate Heart of Mary, and Sisters of the Holy Child Jesus. He also determined that those Sisters of St. Francis of Philadelphia based in Syracuse, New York should establish a separate daughter congregation. He condemned such secret societies as the Freemasons and Molly Maguires.

In 1868 the Dioceses of Harrisburg, Scranton and Wilmington were established, leaving Philadelphia with 93 churches and 157 priests. Wood attended the First Vatican Council, where he supported the definition of papal infallibility, but was forced to leave early in March 1870 due to poor health. He was also named Treasurer of the Board for the Pontifical North American College.

=== Metropolitan Archbishop ===
On February 12, 1875, the Diocese of Philadelphia was elevated to the rank of an archdiocese, with Wood becoming its first Metropolitan Archbishop. He was invested with the pallium by Archbishop James Roosevelt Bayley on the following June 17. He traveled to Rome in 1877 to assist at the celebration of the golden jubilee of Pius IX's episcopate, but returned home after suffering from a severe attack of rheumatism. He also suffered from Bright's disease. Since the division of the diocese in 1868, Wood increased the number of churches to 127 and of chapels to 53 chapels, and founded 25 new parochial schools. By 1883, there were also 31 missions, 260 priests, 99 seminarians between St. Charles Seminary and the North American College, three colleges, 22,000 students in parochial schools, six orphanages, four hospitals, two homes for the elderly and over 300,000 Catholics.

Wood later died in Philadelphia, aged 70. He is buried in the crypt beneath Saints Peter and Paul Cathedral. Archbishop Wood Catholic High School in Warminster is named in his honor.

In 2014, St. Charles Borromeo Seminary decided to sell an 1877 portrait of Archbishop Wood painted by Thomas Eakins. Although Eakins was not Catholic, he and his friend, Samuel Murray, would bicycle on Sundays to the seminary to attend vespers. Eakins took advantage of the brilliant vestments to animate the composition in a way not possible in his other male portraits. Proceeds from the sale will go toward the costs of renovations at the seminary.

Catholic Church titles
| Preceded by John Nepomucene Neumann | Bishop of Philadelphia; January 5, 1860 – February 12, 1875 | Succeeded by Himself as Archbishop of Philadelphia |
| Preceded by Himself as Bishop of Philadelphia | Archbishop of Philadelphia; February 12, 1875 – June 20, 1883 | Succeeded by Patrick John Ryan |
