= Maureen Keleher =

American hospital administrator (1911–1995)

Sister Maureen Keleher
- Born: Agnes Louise Keleher; June 2, 1911; Providence, Rhode Island, US
- Died: November 23, 1995 (aged 84); Manoa, Honolulu, Hawaii, US
- Occupations: Hospital administrator and hospice advocate
- Employer: St. Francis Medical Center
- Title: Chief Executive Officer
- Term: 1953–1988

Sister Maureen Keleher (June 2, 1911 – November 23, 1995) was an American hospital administrator, hospice advocate, and Catholic nun. She was chief executive officer of St. Francis Medical Center in Honolulu, Hawaii, and led the organization from 1953 to 1988. An early advocate of the hospice movement in Hawaii, Keleher established St. Francis Hospice, the first hospice in the state, in 1978. In 1988, St. Francis opened the first freestanding hospice facility in the state, the Sister Maureen Keleher Center, which was named after her. She also was regional administrator of the St. Francis Order of Nuns.

== Early life and education ==
Born Agnes Louise Keleher in Providence, Rhode Island, she was the youngest of six children. In 1931, she entered the Sisters of St. Francis of Syracuse, and professed her final vows as Sister Maureen Keleher in 1936.

After attending St. Joseph Nursing School in Syracuse, New York, she went to the Catholic University of America in Washington, D.C., where she received a master's degree in nursing education. She later received a master's degree in sociology from the University of Hawaiʻi.

== Career ==
During her early career, Keleher taught at St. Joseph Nursing School in Syracuse. In 1951, she arrived in the Territory of Hawaii as assistant administrator at St. Francis Hospital. Promoted to superintendent in 1953, she went on to lead St. Francis Medical Center for 35 years. She was promoted to executive director in 1976, and retired with the title of chief executive officer in 1988.

=== Major initiatives ===
In 1962, the hospital introduced a home care program after receiving a government grant. An early advocate of the hospice movement, Keleher helped to evolve the home care program over time to also offer care for the dying. In 1968, she introduced in-hospital palliative care at St. Francis, designating five rooms for terminal cancer patients to live out their lives in a comfortable setting. The St. Francis Hospice program officially began in 1978, offering 24-hour hospice care both at home and in the hospital, including pain control and team support for the physical, emotional, spiritual, and social needs of terminally ill patients and their families. In 1988, St. Francis opened the first freestanding hospice facility in the state of Hawaii.

By 1985, the organization had grown to 1,300 employees belonging to three unions, and had nine satellite offices. During her tenure, St. Francis Medical Center became a hub for organ transplants in Hawaii. Supportive of the early efforts of Dr. Livingston Wong, Keleher made an animal laboratory available to him. Subsequently, the state's first organ transplants – three kidney transplants on August 10, 1969 – as well as its first heart transplant were performed at St. Francis. The medical center also introduced new treatments such as hemodialysis and laser treatment. In addition to hospice care, St. Francis pioneered other new services including healthcare for the elderly, substance abuse treatment for women, and cancer rehabilitation.

She was a fellow of the American College of Hospital Administrators. Keleher simultaneously was the regional administrator of the St. Francis Order of Nuns through August 1984.

=== Retirement and freestanding hospice ===
In March 1988, Keleher was succeeded as CEO of St. Francis Medical Center by Aileen Griffin, the superior general of the Sisters of Third Order of St. Francis. The Sister Maureen Keleher Center opened in July 1988. Keleher told the media, "it's kind of an answer to prayer", because it provided a "home-like" atmosphere that was a place of "warmth and brightness" for people who are dying.

== Death and legacy ==
After living with Alzheimer's disease for nearly six years, Keleher died on Thanksgiving morning, 1995, at home at Saint Francis Convent in Manoa.

Widely recognized for her leadership in the hospice movement in Hawaii, following her death, Keleher was also remembered as a "visionary" who had pushed for St. Francis Medical Center to open a new campus in West Oahu. Other healthcare leaders such as Eugene Tiwanak, an advocate of affordable long-term care for the elderly, said that he was inspired by Keleher as a mentor and by her philosophy that "patients heal quicker and get better the closer they are to their home environments."
