= St. Joseph's Church (Utica, New York) =

Historic church in New York, United States

- U.S. National Register of Historic Places
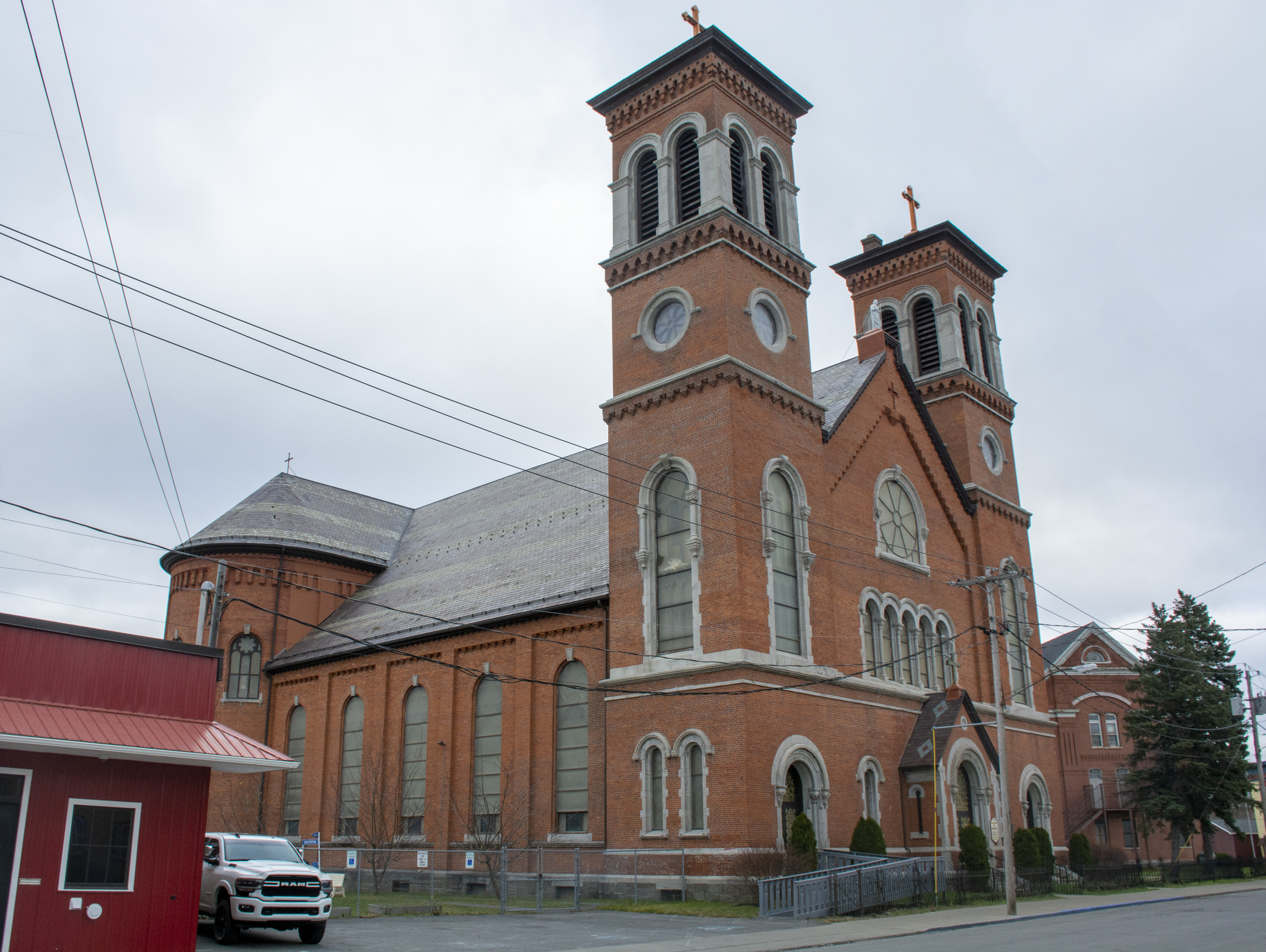

- Location within New York Location within the United States
- Location: 704--708 Columbia St. Utica, New York
- Coordinates: 43°6′18″N 75°14′29″W
- Area: 5.5 acres (2.2 ha)
- Built: 1871
- Architectural style: Romanesque, German Romanesque
- NRHP reference No.: 77000967
- Added to NRHP: August 22, 1977

St. Joseph's Church, also known as St. Joseph & St. Patrick Church, is a historic Roman Catholic church complex at 704-708 Columbia Street in Utica, Oneida County, New York. The complex consists of the church, St. Joseph's Parochial School (1885), St. Joseph's Parochial Residence (1906), and Parish Convent building (1891). The parish is part of the Roman Catholic Diocese of Syracuse.

== History ==
In the early nineteenth century Catholics in the area of Utica were served by missionaries and priests riding circuit out of New York. Rev. Paul McQuade was the first missionary. Pastor of St. Mary's Church, Albany, from 1813 to 1815, made frequent visits to Utica. There is no record of where the first Mass was celebrated in Utica, but there is no doubt that it was in the home of John C. Devereux, one of the pioneer Catholics then (1813) a member of the board of trustees of St. Mary's. Rev. Michael O'Gorman, pastor of St. Mary's in Albany, celebrated the first public Mass in Utica, in the Court House, 10 January 1819. St. John's parish was formed in 1821.

Around that time, German immigrants began to arrive to work on the Erie and Oswego canals. They wished for their own church and priest. According to the official records, Rev. John Lewis Wariath was placed in charge of these immigrants as early as 1837. In 1840 the First Methodist Episcopal Church was purchased and converted to use. In 1847, St. Joseph's became part of the newly established Diocese of Albany. The parochial school was established in 1851. A new wooden church was built the following year.

In 1858 the Conventual Franciscans assumed responsibility for the parish. The friars asked the Sisters of St. Francis of Philadelphia to come teach in the parish schools of St. Joseph's and Assumption in Syracuse. Eight sisters arrived in 1860 and within the year, at the direction of James Frederick Wood, Bishop of Philadelphia, formed a separate congregation the "Sisters of St Francis of Syracuse". In 1866 Mother M. Bernardina founded St. Elizabeth's Hospital in West Utica. It was originally located in a small house donated by the friars. It is now St. Elizabeth's Medical Center.

The present church was built in 1871 and is 180 feet long with a simple basilican plan in the German Romanesque style. It is built of brick with limestone trim. The stained glass windows are by the Tyrolese Art Glass Company of Innsbruck, Austria. St. Joseph Church was listed on the National Register of Historic Places in 1977.

In 1965 St. Joseph and St. Patrick Churches parishes consolidated.

After her beatification, a statue was erected in honor of Mother Marianne Cope, who attended the church in her childhood. In 2008, Mother Marianne's Westside Kitchen opened in St. Joseph & St. Patrick Parish Center. The soup kitchen hot meals and/or bag lunches every day to struggling families and individuals, the unemployed, and the homeless.

== See also ==
- National Register of Historic Places listings in Oneida County, New York
