= Lewis County General Hospital =

New York (state) hospital system

Coordinates: 43°47′44″N 75°29′58″W

- St. Joseph's Health

Geography
- Location: Lewis County, New York, United States

Services
- Beds: 54

History
- Opened: 1931

Links
- Lists: Hospitals in New York State

Lewis County General Hospital (LCGH) is a Short Term Acute Care facility with a level II Emergency Department open twenty-four hours in Lowville, New York. It is part of Lewis County Health System and is Lewis County's largest employer.

== History ==
Lewis County General Hospital opened in August 1931, and has periodically expanded. Local Law 2 of 1973, passed by the legislature of Lewis County, provided for ambulance service.

In 2014, LCGH affiliated with St. Joseph's Health hospital network of Syracuse.

In 2018, LCGH was one of 80 locations for a statewide drug-takeback program to collect old medications.

In 2019, LCGH became part of the newly formed Lewis County Health System.

== Lewis County Health System ==
Lewis County General Hospital shares a 14.5 acre main campus in Lowville, New York, with Lewis County Hospice and the Lewis County General Hospital Certified Home Health Agency (CHHA) and the 160-bed Nursing Home Unit. LCHS has family practice clinics in Beaver Falls, Copenhagen, and South Lewis.

In April 2020, due to the Covid epidemic, elective surgeries were curtailed. That, and the decrease in ancillary visits and people visiting their doctors, led to a decrease in revenue that necessitated the furlough of about 14% of hospital staff. The cuts did not affect the hospice program or nursing home.

In September 2021, Lewis County General Hospital paused its maternity services due to staff shortages. In the interim, pre-natal care was provided at the Women's Health Clinic. Under a Memorandum of Understanding, mothers-to-be in final weeks of pregnancy transitioned to care through Samaritan Medical Center in Watertown. Similar agreements were reached with Carthage Area Hospital and the Mohawk Valley Health System, in Utica.

In April 2022, Lewis County Health System broke ground on a new two-story surgical pavilion. The project was also to include the renovation of medical, surgical, and ICU units at the hospital.
