= Keleher =

Keleher is a surname. Notable people with the surname include:

- James Patrick Keleher (born 1931), American Roman Catholic bishop
- Julia Keleher (born 1974), American educational leader
- Maureen Keleher (1911–1995), American hospital administrator, and Catholic nun
- Patrick Keleher (born 2002), American actor and filmmaker

== See also ==
- Kelleher
