= St. Peter's Health Partners =

New York (state) hospital system

St. Peter's Health Partners is a healthcare system that "runs a chain of hospitals in the Albany area" and is a member of Trinity Health; the latter includes hospitals in 22 states of the United States.

== History ==
=== St. Peter's Hospital ===
In 1865 Peter Cagger purchased the lot at the corner of Broadway and North Ferry Street in North Albany for the Roman Catholic Diocese of Albany, which they used as the St. Vincent's Orphan Asylum. Upon his death his widow donated money to convert the building into a hospital, named St. Peter's Hospital in his honor. The hospital opened in 1869 with 33 beds and a staff of 7 doctors and the Sisters of Mercy as the nursing staff. The hospital moved to its current location on New Scotland Avenue in 1930, the building on Broadway staying open as an out-patient clinic for another year before closing permanently.

With 442 beds, it is the largest Catholic acute care community hospital in northeastern New York state. In 2022 St. Peter’s was named the best hospital in the Capital Region by U.S. News & World Report.

=== St. Peter's Health Care Services ===
St. Peter's Health Care Services was established by the Sisters of Mercy in 1985 with components dating back to 1869. Led by St. Peter's Hospital, the SPHCS system also includes: St. Peter's Addiction Recovery Center (SPARC,) a 40-bed addiction services center; Our Lady of Mercy Life Center, a 160-bed residential care facility; St. Peter's Nursing & Rehabilitation Center, a 160-bed skilled nursing facility; Mercy Cares for Kids, a child day care center; and The Community Hospice, serving patients in residential facilities, hospitals and at home in six counties.

=== Merger ===
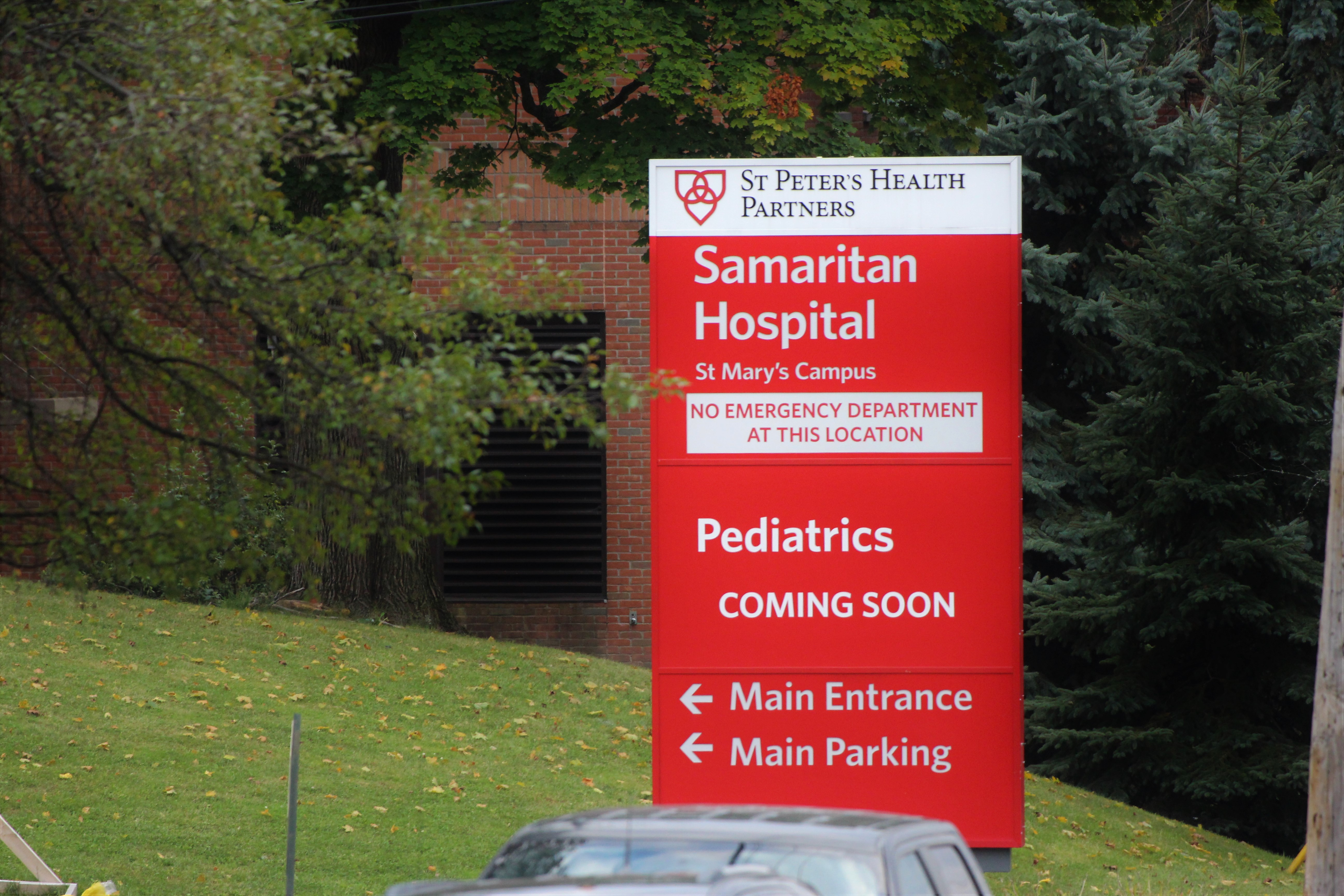
Samaritan Hospital, Troy, New York

St. Peter’s Health Partners was created in 2011 from the merger of St. Peter’s Health Care Services, Seton Health, and Northeast Health. St. Peter’s operates five hospitals:

- St. Peter’s in Albany,
- Samaritan Hospital (Troy, New York)
  - St. Mary's Campus, Troy
  - Albany Memorial Campus, Albany, New York and
- Sunnyview Hospital and Rehabilitation Center (Schenectady)

In November 2021 St. Peter’s Health Partners received national recognition from the Centers for Medicare and Medicaid Services for its new integrated behavioral health model in primary care.

In June 2022 it was announced that St. Peter’s Health Partners would consolidate its administrative functions with St. Joseph's Health (Syracuse, New York) (both members of Trinity Health) to create a single regional operation. Trinity Chief Operating Officer Benjamin Carter said Trinity decided to consolidate the two ministries into one regional ministry to create a more efficient, cost-effective and integrated system.
