= Sisters of St. Francis of the Neumann Communities =

The Sisters of St. Francis of the Neumann Communities was formed in 2004 with the union of three separate congregations: Sisters of St Francis of Syracuse, Sisters of St. Francis of the Mission of the Immaculate Virgin, and the Sisters of St. Francis Third Order Regular of Buffalo (Williamsville Franciscans). During the process of the reorganization, the Franciscan Missionary Sisters of the Divine Child merged with the Williamsville Franciscans in 2003. The Sisters of St. Francis of Millvale merged with the congregation in 2007.

== History ==
The Sisters of St. Francis of Philadelphia are a women's religious congregation of the Franciscan Third Order Regular founded in 1855 by Maria Anna Boll Bachmann, an immigrant from Bavaria. Bachmann was a mother with three children and one on the way, when her husband, Anthony, was killed during anti-immigrant unrest in Philadelphia, stirred up by the American Nativist Party. To make ends meet, she established a small shop and hostel for immigrant women in her home.

With the assistance of Bishop John Neumann, In April 1855 Bachmann, her sister, Barbara Boll; and Anna Dorn, a secular Franciscan residing at the hospice, founded a new religious community, with Bachmann named superior and given the name Sister Mary Francis. They focused their attention on caring for the sick and poor, while supporting themselves by piecework sewing. During a smallpox epidemic in 1858, they continued to care for the sick in the patients’ homes or in their convent. In December 1860, the congregation opened its first hospital, St. Mary's in Philadelphia. It was Neumann who suggested the community expand its activities to include education. They were soon teaching in parochial schools throughout the diocese. The congregation became known for its work in education and healthcare.

=== Sisters of St Francis of Syracuse ===
In the mid-nineteenth century, many German and Irish immigrants worked on the Erie and Oswego canals, the railroad, or for salt producers. Eight Sisters of St. Francis of Philadelphia came to Syracuse in March 1860 to teach at Assumption School, and at St. Joseph’s School in Utica. Later in the year, Bishop Neumann's successor, Bishop James Frederick Wood, separated the Syracuse mission from the Philadelphia foundation, creating a first daughter congregation, the "Sisters of St Francis of Syracuse, New York".

The sisters soon began to care for the sick in the patients' homes. In 1866 Mother M. Bernardina, founder of the Order of St. Francis in Syracuse, founded St. Elizabeth's Hospital in West Utica . It was originally located in a small house donated by St. Joseph Church. It is now St. Elizabeth's Medical Center.

Three years later, the sisters purchased the Samsel property on Prospect Hill, a former dance hall and saloon, and on May 6, opened St. Joseph's Hospital, Syracuse's first public hospital. Mother Marianne Cope served as hospital administrator from 1870 to 1877. Cope was Superior General of the congregation when in 1883, in response to a plea for help from King Kalākaua of Hawaii, she led a group of sisters to Honolulu, where they helped develop the medical infrastructure in Hawaiʻi and care for persons suffering leprosy on the island of Molokaʻi. Cope was canonized a saint in 2012.

In 1898, the sisters opened St. Patrick's Home in Lowell, Massachusetts for young women working in the mills.

=== Sisters of St. Francis Third Order Regular of Buffalo ===
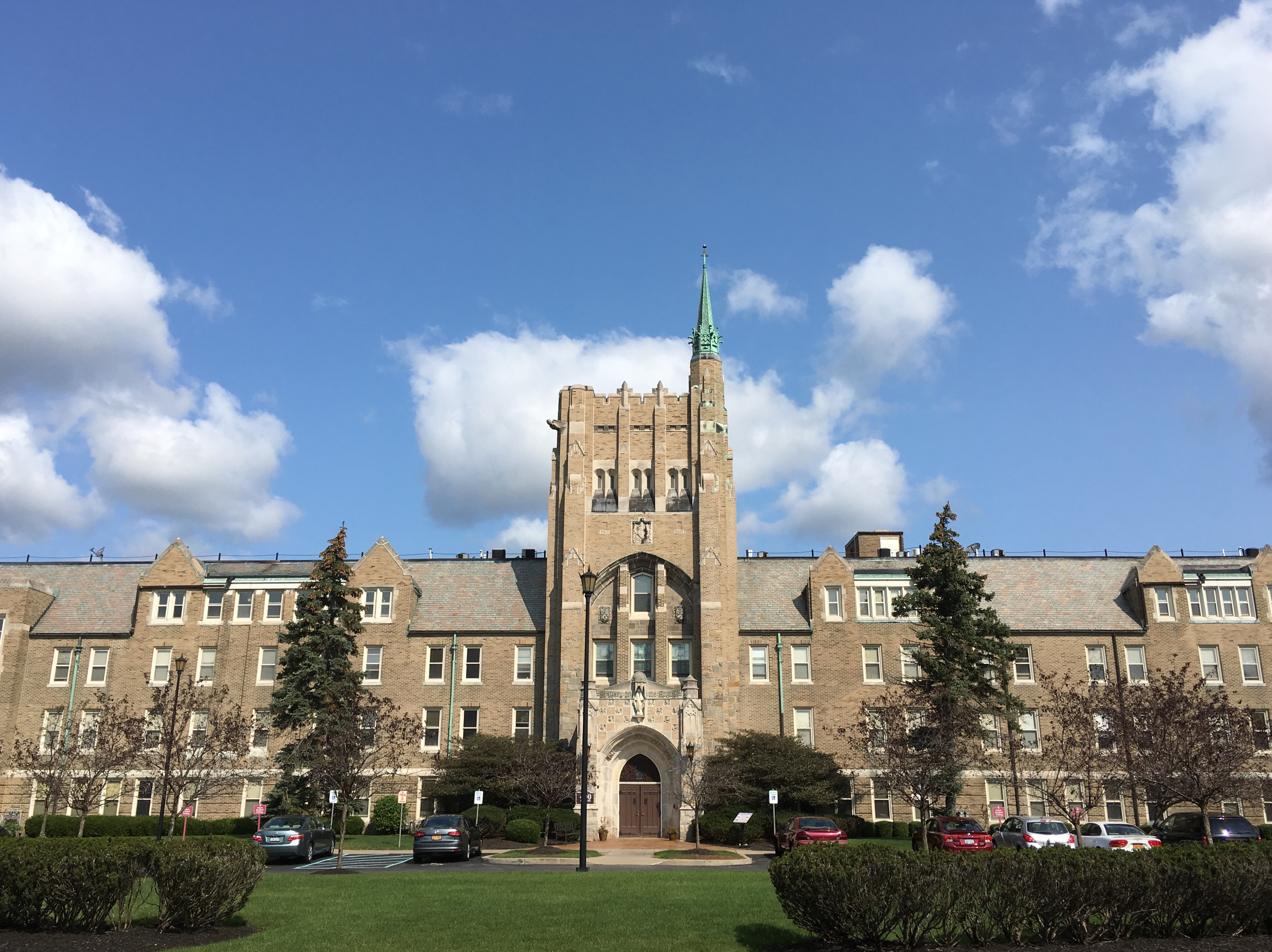
St. Mary of the Angels Motherhouse Complex (Amherst, New York)

Sisters of St. Francis of Philadelphia were also sent to Buffalo, New York in response to the plea of the Redemptorist priests to serve the people of the rapidly growing city. The community in Buffalo became a separate congregation in the autumn of 1863, the Sisters of St. Francis Third Order Regular of Buffalo (Williamsville Franciscans). The motherhouse was St. Mary of the Angels.

The sisters taught in parochial schools throughout the city of Buffalo and beyond. In 1902, the sisters established St. Francis Home for the Aged on 83 acres of donated farmland in Gardenville, New York. The sisters worked the farm growing oats, wheat, rye, and a variety of fruits and vegetables. They also raised chickens and pigs. This provided both food for the Home and revenue for the program. St. Francis Home operated until 1957 when the residents were relocated to St. Elizabeth's in Lancaster, New York.

==== Sisters of St. Francis of the Mission of the Immaculate Virgin ====
Also known as the "Sisters of the Third Order of St. Francis", a number of sisters from the Buffalo house came to New York City to assist Father John Christopher Drumgoole at his homes for newsboys at Lafayette Place and the Mission of the Immaculate Virgin at Mount Loretto on Staten Island. They became a separate congregation in 1893. In 1896 St. Joseph's Asylum for the Blind was opened, followed by St. Benedict's House for children of color. The motherhouse was at Mount Hope in Hastings-on-Hudson, New York. They also ran St. Francis Hospital in Poughkeepsie, New York.

==== Sisters of St. Francis of Millvale ====
The Sisters of St. Francis of Millvale of Mt. Alvernia, Millvale, Pennsylvania was founded by sisters from the Buffalo community. The sisters began their ministries in Pittsburgh in 1865 when sisters Elizabeth Kaufman, Magdalene Hess and Stephen Winkelman were sent to Pittsburgh from Buffalo, N.Y., to establish a hospital for German Catholics. They became a separate congregation in 1871. The congregation opened hospitals, ran volunteer programs, and operated Mount Alvernia High School for 75 years. The high school closed in 2011. In September 2007 they joined the Neumann congregation.

=== Franciscan Missionary Sisters of the Divine Child ===
The "Blue Nuns" were founded in 1927 in Buffalo to serve children of Italian immigrants in need of religious instruction. The sisters taught in parchial schools in Buffalo, Brooklyn, and San Antonio. They ran a food pantry for migrant workers in Lockport. They also conducted home visitations, taking a census for different parishes and had a mission in Brazil. In 2003 they merged with the Williamsville Franciscans.

== Present day ==
In 2003, the Sisters of the Divine Child merged with the Buffalo Franciscans. The following year, three communities that trace their origin to the Philadelphia motherhouse, combined to form a new congregation, the "Sisters of St. Francis of the Neumann Communities". As of 2023, there were about 322 vowed women religious, serving in 12 states, the District of Columbia, Kenya and Peru. The congregation maintains a shrine /museum to Saint Marianne Cope in Syracuse. The Stella Maris Retreat Center on the shore of Skaneateles Lake was closed in 2014, as fiscally unsustainable; the property was subsequently sold. Saint Francis School, founded in 1924 in Honolulu, Hawaii, is sponsored by the Sisters of Saint Francis of the Neumann Communities.
