= Marianne Cope =

German-born American Franciscan Sister, saint and missionary to Hawaii (1838–1918)

Saint Marianne Cope OSF
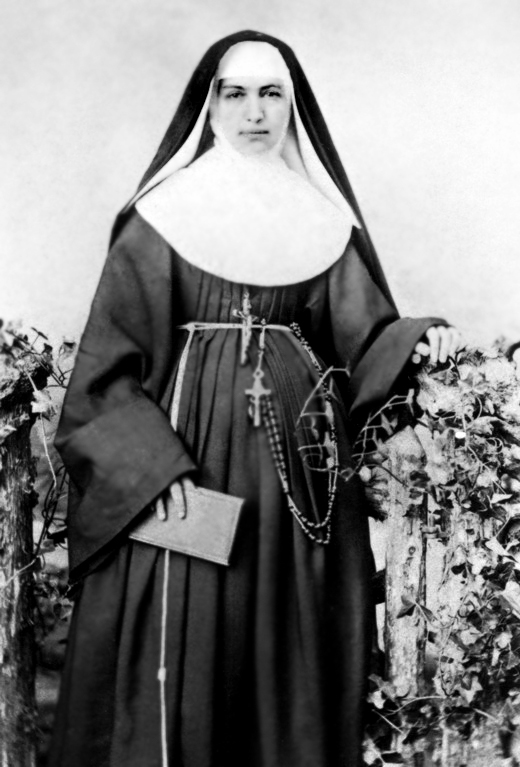
- Marianne Cope shortly before her departure for Hawaii (1883)

Virgin
- Born: Barbara Koob; January 23, 1838; Heppenheim, Grand Duchy of Hesse
- Died: August 9, 1918 (aged 80); Kalaupapa, Territory of Hawaiʻi, United States
- Resting place: Cathedral Basilica of Our Lady of Peace, Honolulu, Hawaii, United States
- Venerated in: Roman Catholic Church, Episcopal Church
- Beatified: May 14, 2005, Saint Peter's Basilica, Vatican City, by Pope Benedict XVI
- Canonized: October 21, 2012, Vatican City, by Pope Benedict XVI
- Major shrine: Saint Marianne Cope Shrine & Museum; 601 N. Townsend St. Syracuse, New York, United States
- Feast: January 23 (Catholic Church); April 15 (Episcopal Church)

Marianne Cope, OSF, also known as Marianne of Molokaʻi (born Barbara Koob; January 23, 1838 – August 9, 1918), was a German-born American member of the Sisters of St. Francis of Syracuse. She was founding director of St. Joseph's Hospital in the city, among the first general hospitals in the country. In 1883, she led a group of six other sisters to the Kingdom of Hawaii to care for lepers in Molokaʻi and aid in developing the kingdom's medical infrastructure. Despite direct contact with patients over many years, Cope did not contract the disease. In 2005, she was beatified by Pope Benedict XVI. She was canonized in 2012.

== Life ==
=== Birth and vocation ===
She was born Barbara Koob (later anglicized to "Cope") on January 23, 1838, in Heppenheim in the Grand Duchy of Hesse to Peter Koob (1787–1862) and his wife Barbara Witzenbacher (1803–1872). The following year her family emigrated to the United States, settling in the industrial city of Utica, New York. They became members of the Parish of St Joseph, where Barbara attended parish school. By the time she was in eighth grade, her father had developed a disability. As the oldest child, Barbara left school to work in a textile factory to support her family. The family became naturalized as American citizens in the 1850s.

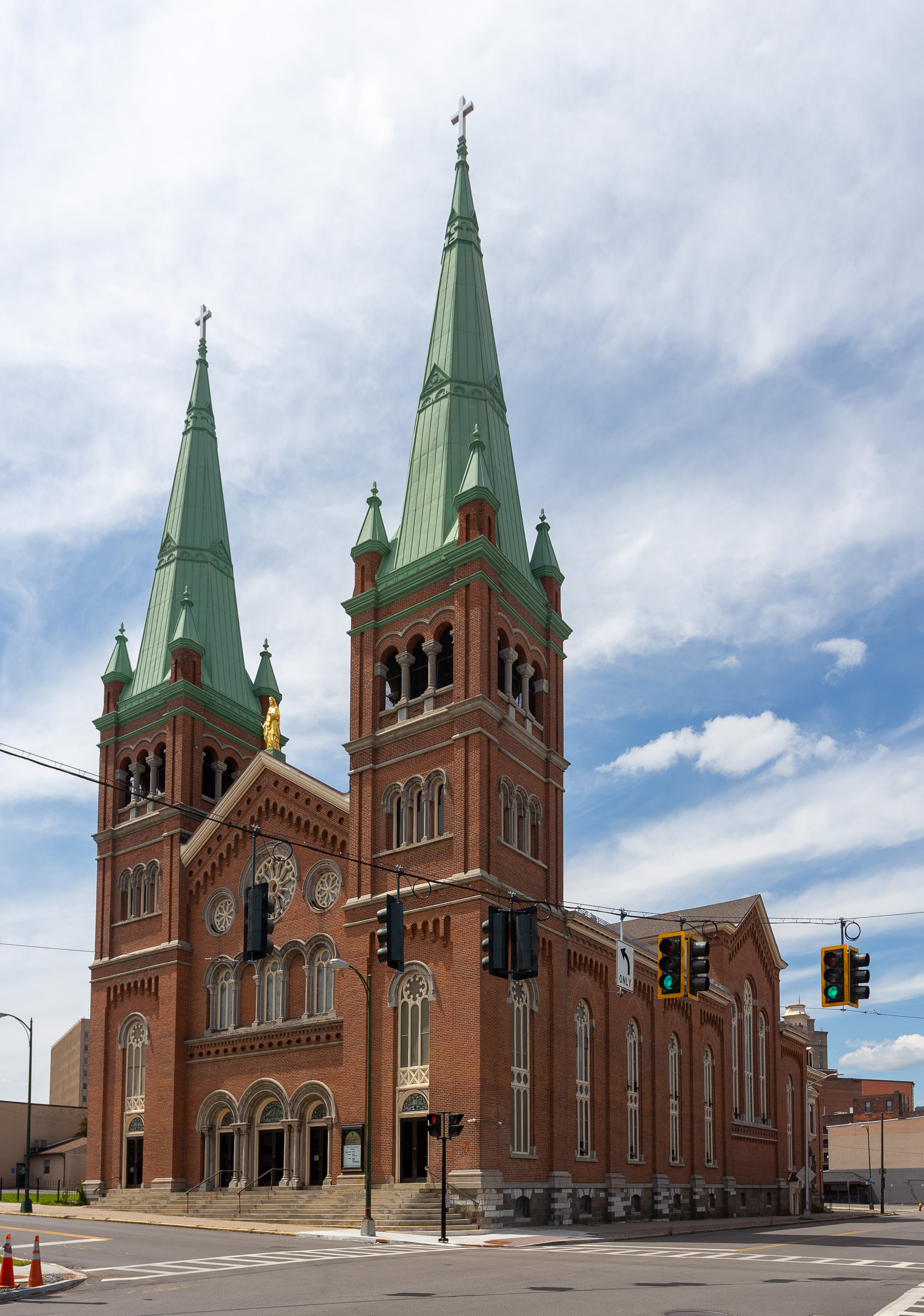
Historic Old St. John's Church, Utica New York

Cope received her First Holy Communion and Confirmation at the historic Old St. Johns Church in Utica, New York.

By the time that their father died in 1862, the younger children in the family were of age to support themselves, so Barbara pursued her long-felt religious calling. She entered the novitiate of the Sisters of the Third Order Regular of Saint Francis in Syracuse, New York. After a year of formation, Cope received the religious habit of the Franciscan Sisters and the new name Marianne. She became first a teacher and then a principal in newly established schools for the region's German-speaking immigrants. Following the revolutions of 1848, more German Catholic immigrants entered the United States.

By 1870, Cope had become a member of the governing council of her religious congregation. She helped found the first two Catholic hospitals in Central New York, with charters stipulating that medical care was to be provided to all, regardless of race or creed. She was appointed by the Superior General to govern St. Joseph's Hospital, the first public hospital in Syracuse, serving from 1870 to 1877.

As a hospital administrator, Cope became involved with the move of Geneva Medical College of Hobart College from Geneva, New York, to Syracuse, where it became the College of Medicine at Syracuse University. She contracted with the college to accept their students for treating patients in her hospital to further their medical education. Her stipulation in the contract—again unique for the period—was the right of the patients to refuse care by the students. These experiences helped prepare her for the special ministry she next pursued.

=== Call to Hawaii ===
In 1883, Mother Marianne Cope, by then Superior General of the congregation, received a plea for help from King Kalākaua of Hawaii to care for people with leprosy. More than 50 religious congregations had already declined his request because leprosy was considered to be highly contagious. She responded enthusiastically to the letter:

I am hungry for the work and I wish with all my heart to be one of the chosen Ones, whose privilege it will be, to sacrifice themselves for the salvation of the souls of the poor Islanders... I am not afraid of any disease, hence it would be my greatest delight even to minister to the abandoned 'lepers.'

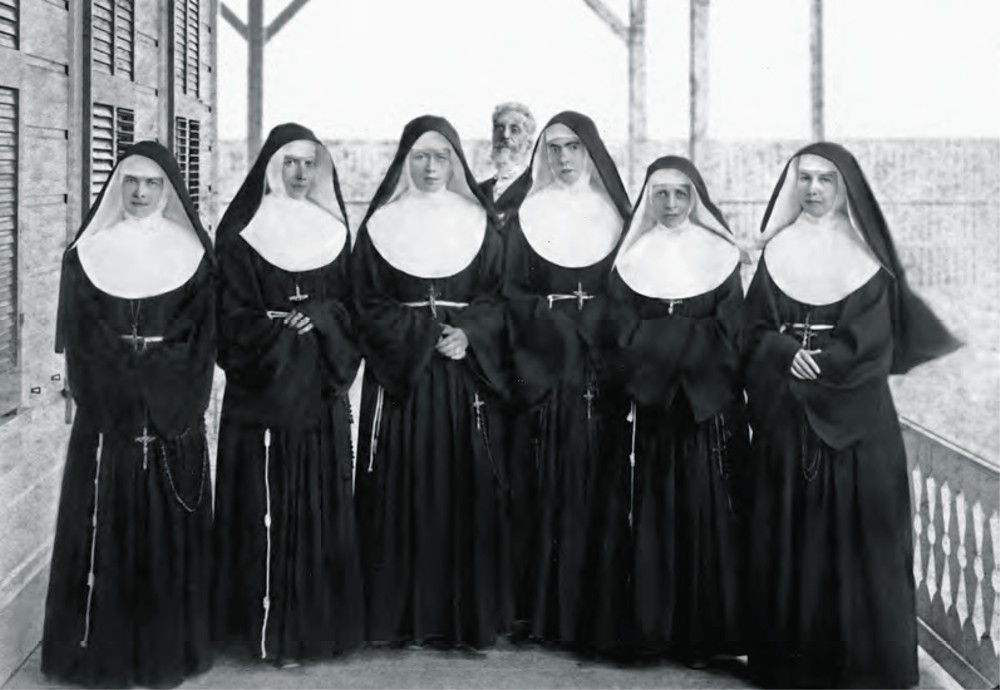
The Sisters of St. Francis, at the Kakaʻako Branch Hospital

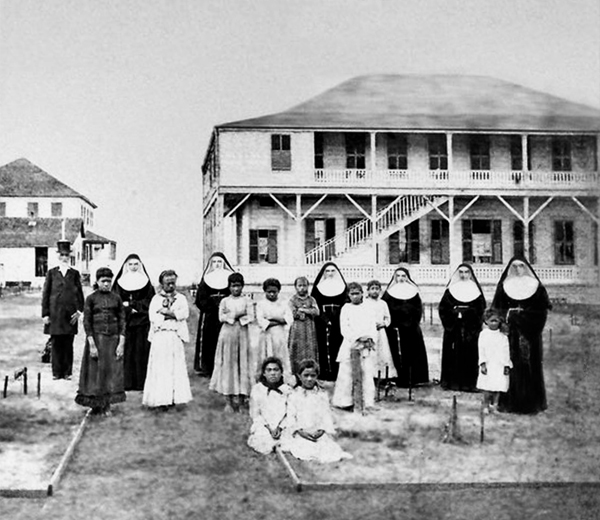
Walter Murray Gibson with the Sisters of St. Francis and daughters of Hansen's disease patients, at the Kakaʻako Branch Hospital

Cope departed from Syracuse with six other Sisters to travel to Honolulu to answer this call, arriving on November 8, 1883. They traveled on the SS Mariposa. With Mother Marianne as a supervisor, the Sisters' task was to manage Kakaʻako Branch Hospital on Oʻahu, which served as a receiving station for Hansen's disease patients gathered from all over the islands. The more severe cases were processed and shipped to the island of Molokaʻi for confinement in the settlement at Kalawao, and then later at Kalaupapa.

The following year, at the government's request, Cope set up Malulani Hospital, the first general hospital on the island of Maui. Soon, she was called back to the hospital in Oahu. She had to deal with a government-appointed administrator's maltreatment of the leprosy patients at the Branch Hospital at Kakaako, an area adjoining Honolulu. She told the government that either the administrator had to be dismissed or the Sisters would return to Syracuse. She was given charge of the overcrowded hospital. Her return to Syracuse to re-assume governance of the congregation was delayed, as both the government and church authorities thought she was essential to the mission's success.

Two years later, the king awarded Mother Marianne with the Cross of a Companion of the Royal Order of Kapiolani for her care of his people. The work continued to increase. In November 1885, she opened the Kapiolani Home with the government's support to provide shelter to homeless female children of leprosy patients. The home was located on a leprosy hospital's grounds because only the Sisters were willing to care for children so closely associated with people suffering from leprosy.

In 1887, a new government came into office. It ended the forced exile of leprosy patients to Molokai and closed the specialty hospital in Oahu. A year later, the authorities pleaded with the Sisters to establish a new home for women and girls on the Kalaupapa peninsula of Molokai. Marianne accepted the call, knowing that it might mean she would never return to New York. "We will cheerfully accept the work..." was her response.

=== Molokai ===
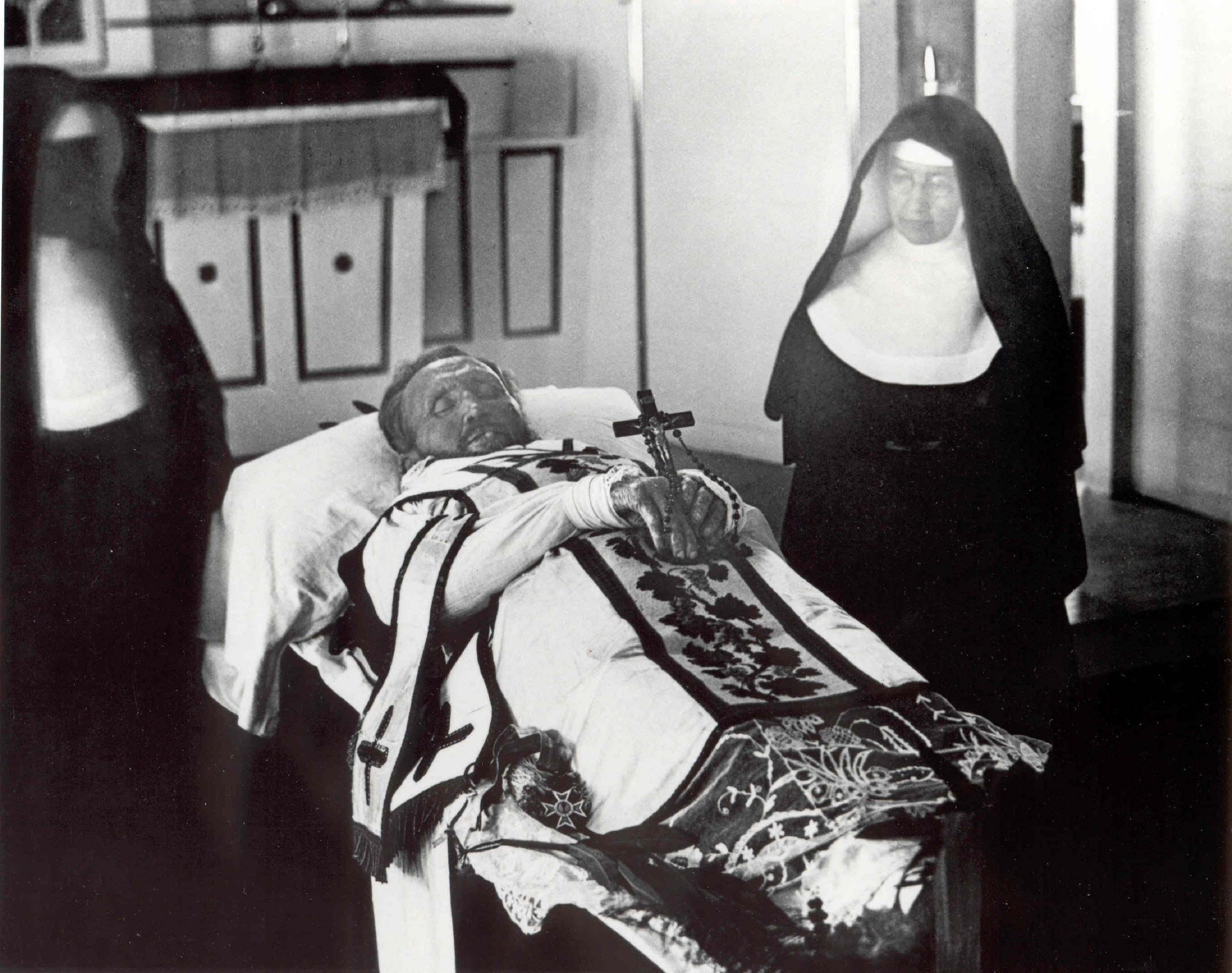
Mother Marianne Cope and Sister Leopoldina Burns beside the funeral bier of Father Damien

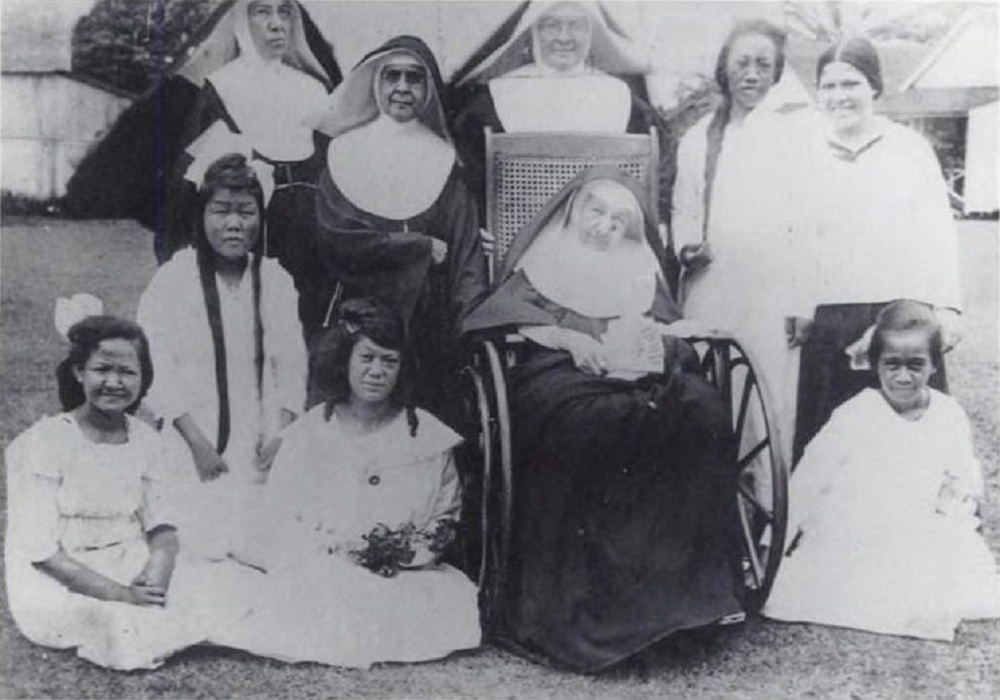
Mother Marianne Cope (in the wheelchair) only a few days before she died

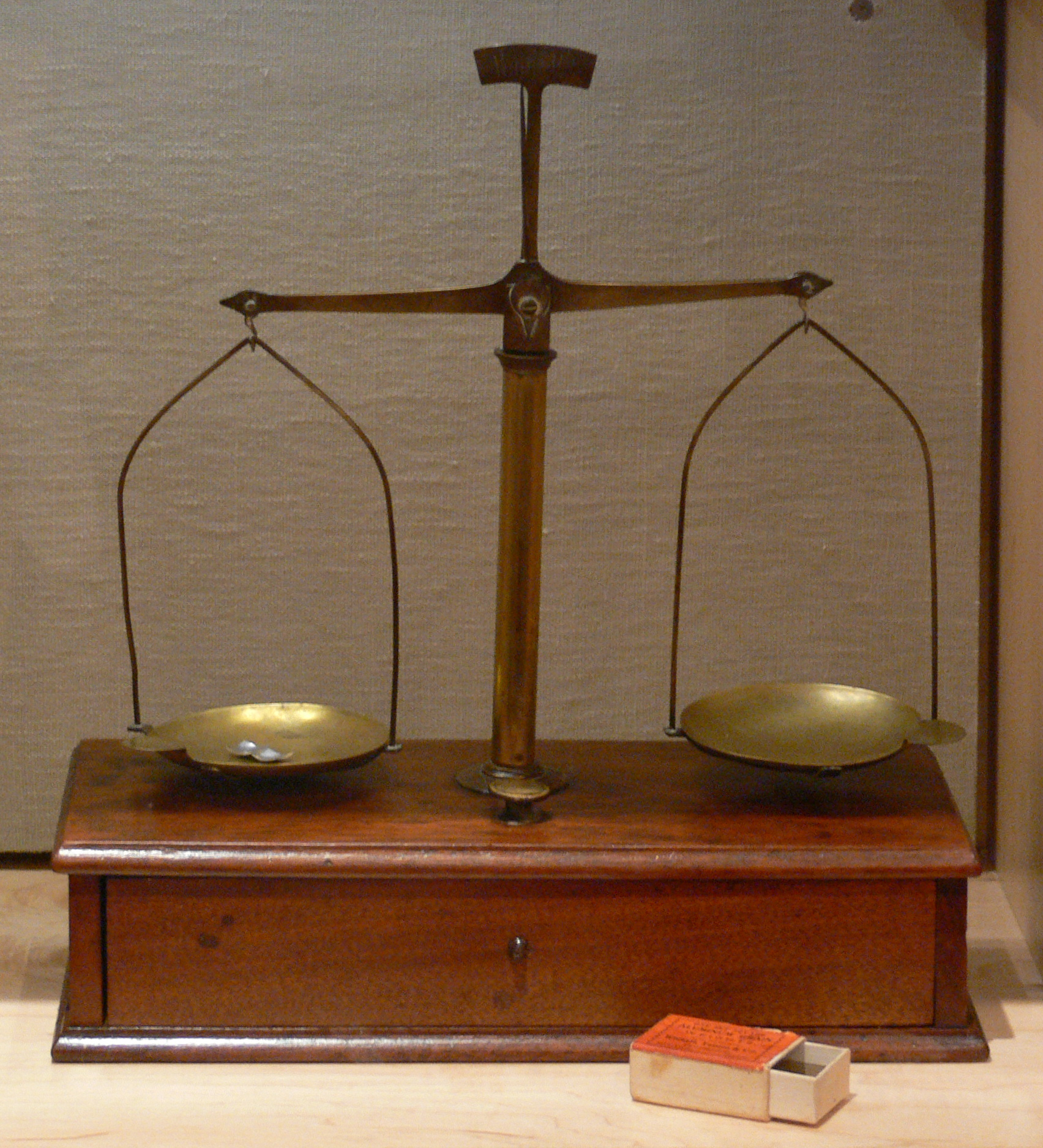
Scales used by Mother Marianne Cope and the Sisters to measure medicine, Kalaupapa, Hawaii, in the late 1880s

In November 1888, Marianne moved to the "Charles R Bishop Home for Unprotected Leper Girls and Women" on Kalaupapa. She cared for the dying Father Damien, SS.CC., who was already known internationally for his work in the leper colony and began to take over his burdens. She had met him shortly after her arrival in Hawaii.

In 1879, Father Damien had established a home at Kalawao for boys and elderly men. Most of the work of the home fell to Joseph Dutton. When Damien died on April 15, 1889, the government officially gave Mother Marianne charge of care of the boys along with her current role in caring for the colony's female residents. The Board of Health provided a horse and carriage for the sisters to use in traveling between Kalaupapa and Kalawao. The sisters generally supervised the domestic operations. In 1892, a prominent local businessman, Henry Perrine Baldwin, donated money for the new home, which was named after him. A community of Religious Brothers was sought to come and care for the boys. After the arrival of four Brothers of the Sacred Heart in 1895, Mother Marianne withdrew the Sisters to the Bishop Home for leprous women and girls. Joseph Dutton was given charge of Baldwin House by the government.

== Death ==
Marianne Cope died of natural causes on August 9, 1918. She was buried on the grounds of the Bishop Home. In 2005, her remains were brought to Syracuse for reinterment at her motherhouse. In 2014, her remains, except one first-class bone relic, were returned to Honolulu and are enshrined at the Cathedral Basilica of Our Lady of Peace.

== Legacy and honors ==
- 1927 – Saint Francis Hospital was founded in Honolulu in her memory as a community hospital and trained nurses to work with Hansen's disease patients.
- 1957 – St. Francis opened the Child Development Center at the Honolulu Community Church.
- 1962 – St. Francis Home Care Services was established, the first in Hawaii to specialize in home health care for Hawaiian people.
- 2005, Induction into the National Women's Hall of Fame.
- 2006 – The Sisters of St. Francis chose to focus on long-term care, transferring St. Francis Hospital's two facilities to a private board. The facilities are now known as the Hawaii Medical Center East in Liliha, and Hawaii Medical Center West in Ewa. Both hospitals were closed at the end of 2011. In August 2012, The Queen's Health Systems agreed to acquire the former Hawaii Medical Center West and reopen the hospital in the fall of 2013.
- The Saint Francis School was founded in Cope's honor in 1924, operating as a girls-only school for grades 6–9.

The community which Cope founded on Molokai continues to minister to the few patients who have Hansen Disease. The Franciscan Sisters work at several schools and minister to parishioners throughout the Hawaiian Islands.

=== Beatification ===
In 1993, Katherine Dehlia Mahoney was allegedly healed from multiple-organ failure after praying to Marianne Cope for intercession. On October 24, 2003, the Congregation for the Causes of Saints declared Marianne Cope to have been "heroically virtuous." On April 19, 2004, Pope John Paul II issued a decree declaring her Venerable. On December 20, 2004, after receiving the unanimous affirmation of the Congregation of the Causes of Saints, Pope John Paul II ordered a decree to be issued authenticating this recovery as a miracle to be attributed to the intercession of Cope. On May 14, 2005, Marianne Cope was beatified in Vatican City by decision of Pope Benedict XVI. Over 100 followers from Hawaiʻi attended the beatification Mass, along with 300 members of Cope's religious congregation in Syracuse. At the Mass, presided over by Cardinal José Saraiva Martins, the Hawaiian song "Makalapua" (a favorite of Cope) was sung. Her feast day was established as January 23 and is celebrated by her own religious congregation, the Diocese of Honolulu, and the Diocese of Syracuse.

After the announcement by the Holy See of her impending beatification, during January 2005, Mother Marianne's remains were moved to the motherhouse of the congregation in Syracuse. A temporary shrine was established to honor her and by 2009, the erection of a marble sarcophagus in the motherhouse chapel was complete. Her remains were interred in the new shrine on her feast day of January 23.

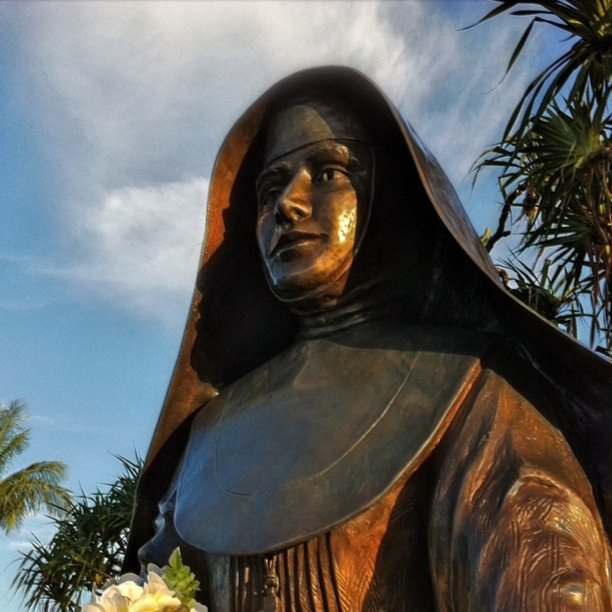
Mother Marianne Cope statue dedicated January 23, 2010, in Honolulu

In 2007, a statue of her was erected at St Joseph's Church in her native Utica, whose parish school she had attended as a child.

=== Canonization ===
On December 6, 2011, the Congregation for the Causes of Saints found that a second miracle could also be attributed to the intercession of Cope. This finding was presented to Pope Benedict XVI for his approval by Cardinal Angelo Amato. On December 19, 2011, Pope Benedict signed and approved the promulgation of the decree for Marianne Cope's canonization, which took place on October 21, 2012; a relic was carried to Honolulu from her mother church. Dr. Waldery Hilgeman was the Postulator of the Cause of Canonization.

After Father Damien, Mother Marianne Cope is the second person to be canonized who had served in the Hawaiian Islands. She was both the first Beatification and the last Canonization under Pope Benedict XVI. In 2014, the Church announced that Saint Marianne's remains would be re-interred at the Cathedral of Our Lady of Peace in Honolulu, a more convenient location for the faithful than the Kalaupapa National Historical Park on Molokaʻi, where access is primarily by plane or mule train. St. Marianne sometimes attended Mass at the cathedral, and it was where Father Damien was ordained. In New York, the Franciscan Convent which held her remains, moved to a new location because its former buildings needed extensive repairs.

=== Ecumenical veneration ===
Cope is honored jointly with Saint Damien of Moloka'i on the liturgical calendar of the Episcopal Church (USA) since 2022 (and unofficially or as a trial observance since 2010). Their shared feast day is celebrated on April 15. Some Anglo-Catholic Episcopal churches in Hawaii celebrate her separately from Damien on the Roman Catholic feast day.

== In arts and media ==
Paul Cox directed the film Molokai: The Story of Father Damien (1999). Marianne Cope was portrayed by South African actress Alice Krige. Father Damien was portrayed by David Wenham.

== See also ==
- List of American saints and beatified people
