= Mother Seton Academy =

Location
- 2215 Greenmount Avenue; Baltimore, (Baltimore City), Maryland 21218; United States; 39.3150°N 76.6091°W

Information
- Religious affiliation: Roman Catholic
- Patron saint: Elizabeth Ann Seton
- Established: 1993
- Authority: Archdiocese of Baltimore
- President: George E. Andrews, Jr.
- Principal: Dr. Gregory Sucre
- Grades: 6 - 8
- Enrollment: Over 80 (2024)
- Website: http://www.mothersetonacademy.org

Mother Seton Academy (MSA) is an independent, tuition-free Catholic middle school in Baltimore, Maryland, United States. Established in 1993, it serves students in grades 6 to 8 from underserved, low-income families. Named after Saint Elizabeth Ann Seton, the founder of the first free Catholic school in the United States, MSA was created through a collaboration of six religious congregations within the Archdiocese of Baltimore: School Sisters of Notre Dame, Sisters of St. Francis of Philadelphia, Daughters of Charity of Saint Vincent de Paul, Sisters, Servants of the Immaculate Heart of Mary, Xaverian Brothers, and the Society of Mary (Marianists).

Operating under the NativityMiguel model, the academy emphasizes academic excellence, personal growth, and leadership development in a multicultural environment. With a current enrollment of about 80 students, the academy maintains small class sizes and offers extracurricular activities such as art, music, sports, and community service. All students receive full scholarships. MSA's Graduate Support Program provides ongoing assistance to alumni, helping them succeed in high school and higher education.

== History ==
=== Early years ===
Mother Seton Academy began in 1993 in a building at St. Patrick’s Church in East Baltimore. Initially, the school served 20 students with a staff of six, and featured an extended school day and year. In 1994, it relocated to a larger space at the former convent of St. Stanislaus Parish in Fell's Point, adding a seventh grade and doubling its enrollment. In 2003, trustees of MSA explored starting a capital fund to purchase the location on South Ann Street.

=== Collaborations ===
The school has benefited from collaborations with organizations and community members. The school has worked with AmeriCorps volunteers. The Roman Catholic Archdiocese of Baltimore has helped raise funding for the MSA. In 1997, Rafael Alvarez and David Simon hosted readings of their books to benefit MSA. In 1999, the Mr. Holland's Opus Foundation provided a grant that allowed the school to set up a free band program. In 1999, Corpus Christi Community Center worked with MSA to set up an after-school tutoring program.

=== Current location and expansion ===
In 2006, Sister Charmaine Krohe became president of MSA. Since 2009, the academy has been located at 2215 Greenmount Avenue after purchasing and renovating the former St. Ann School. Baltimore Ravens owner Steve Bisciotti and other donors funded the purchase and renovation of the new location.

In 2019, the school added a new gymnasium. Jeremy Freeman, the director of men's basketball operations for Holy Cross Crusaders, coached basketball at MSA.

== Awards ==
In 2002, MSA was awarded the Milch Award by Loyola University Maryland for its service to the community.
