= St. Francis Hospice, Hawaii =

First hospice in state of Hawaii (est. 1978)

St. Francis Hospice
- Formation: 1978
- Founder: Sister Maureen Keleher; Sister Francine Gries
- Headquarters: Honolulu, Hawaii
- Location: US
- Parent organization: St. Francis Healthcare System of Hawaii
- Website: stfrancishawaii.org/hospice

St. Francis Hospice is an end-of-life care provider in Honolulu, Hawaii. Founded in 1978, it was the first hospice provider in the state, and is part of the St. Francis Healthcare System of Hawaii. The hospice currently provides end-of-life care for terminally ill patients at home and in its dedicated 12-bed facility at the Sister Maureen Keleher Center in Nuʻuanu, which was the first freestanding hospice facility in the state. Sponsored by a Catholic religious order, the hospice admits patients regardless of religious belief, and also provides support for their families.

== History ==
Palliative care in Hawaii was started in 1968 by Sister Maureen Keleher, chief executive of St. Francis Medical Center, who opened five hospital rooms for terminal cancer patients to live out their lives comfortably. Prior to that, St. Francis had offered assistance to dying patients and their families, through its home care program which started in 1962.

In 1978, the end-of-life services were formally integrated as St. Francis Hospice, offering pain control and 24-hour care for patients in the hospital or at home. Led by Sister Francine Gries, St. Francis Hospice was the most "advanced" program in Hawaii offering hospice care at the time, despite significant obstacles including the lack of medical insurance coverage for patients, and the reluctance of physicians and nurses to admit when patients could no longer be cured.

=== Sister Maureen Keleher Center ===
In 1985, St. Francis Hospital launched a $2 million fundraising drive to establish Hawaii's first freestanding hospice facility. By then, its hospice program was already the largest in the state, and the only one federally certified for coverage under Medicare and HMSA. The following year, it broke ground for construction of a new wing adjacent to a 1920s home it had acquired in Nuʻuanu Valley. Writing in Hawaii Medical Journal, journalist A. A. Smyser noted that St. Francis Hospice's new main "rival", Hospice Hawaii, was rooting for St. Francis to hit its fundraising target, because the two organizations were able to provide care for only a fraction of patients in Hawaii diagnosed as terminally ill.

In July 1988, a dedicated 12-bed facility was opened in the restored home at 24 Puiwa Road, off Pali Highway in Nuʻuanu. Named after the former chief executive, who stepped down earlier that year, the Sister Maureen Keleher Center offered a relaxed, home-like atmosphere where patients could die in comfort. At the time, it was the only freestanding hospice in the state of Hawaii. When it opened, The Honolulu Advertiser described the main building as "graceful" and "beautifully restored", with an "interior...done in muted pastels; the living room has a piano, easy chairs and a fireplace; the dining room has round koa tables and chairs; and a veranda and garden offer pleasant views of the one-acre estate." The newly built patient wing had "eight private and two double-occupancy rooms, a chapel and a nurses' station."

=== Expansion ===
In 1997, a new 24-bed facility, the Maurice J. Sullivan Family Hospice Center, was opened at the St. Francis Healthcare campus at Ewa Beach. The Honolulu Star-Bulletin reported that by then, roughly one-fifth of all deaths in Hawaii were assisted by hospice care. That same year, the St. Francis Healthcare System published an end-of-life care manual, Ethical and Religious Directives for Catholic Health Care Services, as a resource for staff throughout the organization. The manual helped to educate medical professionals working primarily in acute care settings about hospice and home care, reminding them that conversations about end-of-life care can be beneficial even when patients are not facing imminent death.

By 2000, St. Francis Hospice had 60 employees and 125 volunteers serving 1,000 patients and their families each year, across its two facilities and at home. As the only hospice in Hawaii then accredited by the Joint Commission on Accreditation of Healthcare Organizations, St. Francis Hospice also helped to educate medical professionals from around the world about end-of-life care, including visitors from Japan and Korea.

In 2008, St. Francis Hospice announced that it was investing $3 million to upgrade its two facilities in Nuʻuanu and Ewa Beach. The renovations included extensive repairs, painting, and landscaping of the Nuʻuanu facility, which was originally built in 1917.

=== Reorganization ===
In 2014, the Ewa Beach hospice facility became part of Queen's West, when St. Francis sold its West Oʻahu campus to new owners. In 2021, Queen's West announced plans to "remove" the Sullivan Care Center hospice facility.

== Services ==
St. Francis Hospice continues to operate the Sister Maureen Keleher Center in Nuʻuanu, as well as providing hospice care in patients' homes, at nursing facilities, and at care homes. It also offers supportive care for patients diagnosed with terminal illnesses, who are receiving both hospice care and curative treatment at the same time; spiritual care and counseling for all faiths to help patients and their families cope with terminal illness, pain, loss, and grief; and social workers providing bereavement support to families.

Every year in December, St. Francis Hospice holds a "Light Up a Memory" tree-lighting event. Bereaved families are invited to return to the Sister Maureen Keleher Center to hang stars with the names of the deceased, and see hospice staff and volunteers who helped to care for their loved ones over the past year.
