= St. Joseph's Health (Syracuse, New York) =

New York (state) hospital system

Coordinates: 43.0560°N 76.1488°W

St. Joseph Hospital
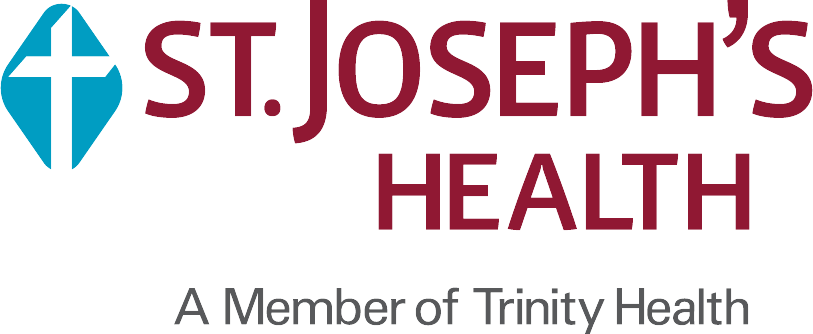

Geography
- Location: Syracuse, New York, United States

Services
- Beds: 451

History
- Opened: 1869

Links
- Website: sjhsyr.org
- Lists: Hospitals in New York State

St. Joseph's Health is a not-for-profit healthcare network in Central New York. It is anchored by St. Joseph's Health Hospital with 451 inpatient beds, located in the near Northside of Syracuse. Since 2015, St. Joseph's Health has been a division of Trinity Health, a Catholic health system based in Livonia, Michigan.

== History ==
=== St. Joseph's Health Hospital ===
In the mid-nineteenth century, many German and Irish migrants worked on the Erie and Oswego canals, the railroad, or for salt producers. As the area was growing rapidly, eight Sisters of St. Francis of Philadelphia came to Syracuse in March 1860 to teach at Assumption School and St. Joseph's in Utica. Later that year, they became a separate community, the Sisters of St. Francis of Syracuse. Working out of St. Anthony's Convent, they soon began to provide at-home care for the sick. In 1869, the sisters purchased the Samsel property on Prospect Hill, a former dance hall and saloon, and on May 6, opened St. Joseph's Hospital, Syracuse's first public hospital. Sister Dominic was in charge, assisted by Sisters Mechtildes, Veronica, Johanna, and Hyacinthe. The hospital had a unique charter for its time; open to caring for the sick without distinction as to nationality, religion, or color.

Mother Marianne Cope served as St. Joe's administrator from 1870 to 1877. In 1883 she relocated with six other sisters to Hawaiʻi to care for persons suffering leprosy on the island of Molokaʻi and aid in developing the medical infrastructure in Hawaiʻi. Cope was canonized by Pope Benedict XVI on October 21, 2012.

In 1871 Geneva Medical College was transferred to Syracuse University. One of the reasons for the move was that Syracuse had a hospital. Many of the city's businessmen and politicians supported the work of the hospital. In 1878 mayor James J. Belden formed a committee of citizens, St. Joseph's Hospital Aid Society, to look after the interests of St. Joseph's. Local businessman John R. Clancy served as financial secretary. Dennis McCarthy followed Theodore Dissel as president; he was later followed by Burns Lyman Smith and Harvey D. Burrill of the Syracuse Journal.

The hospital was enlarged in 1882 by an addition, and again in 1896 with the construction of a large annex. The new hospital chapel was dedicated May 17, 1897. The school of nursing opened in 1898. The school of nursing opened in 1898. St. Joseph's College of Nursing offers an applied science degree with a major in nursing. A Dual Degree Partnership in Nursing (DDPN) with Le Moyne College allows students to achieve both an associate and a baccalaureate degree in four years.

In July 1918, St. Joseph's was one of a number of local hospitals providing emergency care to those injured in an explosion of TNT at the munitions factory at Split Rock.

In 1969, on its 100th anniversary, St. Joseph's Hospital changed its name to "St. Joseph's Hospital Health Center" to reflect the greater scope of services provided.

In 1971 St. Joseph's appointed its first lay administrator. That same year saw the creation of the Home Health Care Agency. In 1994, St. Joe's instituted a primary care program at a number of off-campus sites.

In April 2016, St. Joseph's added twenty new beds to its critical care unit. In 2016, St. Joseph's settlement with state and federal prosecutors for $3.2 million for employing unlicensed mental health counselors. President and CEO, Kathy Ruscitto, said it was a billing issue arising from "...a misinterpretation of unclear regulations..."

In 2004, the Sisters of St. Francis of Syracuse merged with two other Franciscan congregations to form the Sisters of St. Francis of the Neumann Communities.

The Comprehensive Psychiatric Emergency Program (CPEP) with 10 beds was added in 2017, so patients with mental health crises may be treated in a specialized environment.

The hospital added a heliport in 2018. In April 2020, in response to New York State's directive for hospitals to halt elective surgeries as a COVID-19 precaution, St Joseph's furloughed 500 employees, linking the move to the suspension of outpatient procedures.

=== Saint Joseph's Health ===
In 2015, St. Joseph's Health was acquired by Trinity Health, one of the nation's biggest health systems. On July 1, the sisters transferred sponsorship of St. Joseph Health to Trinity Health's Catholic Health Ministries. St. Joseph's Home Health Care provides care for adults and children with physical and mental health care needs and assure continuity of care for patients discharged from the hospital. St. Joseph's Health-At-Home is based in Liverpool, New York. Its services include a military and veterans health care program.

In February 2019, St. Joseph's Health Cardiovascular Institute opened an office on Oneida Health's campus in Oneida.

In June 2022, it was announced that St. Joseph's Health would consolidate its administrative functions with Albany's St. Peter's Health Partners to create a single regional operation.

== Affiliates ==
In 2014, Lewis County General Hospital affiliated with St. Joseph's Health.

In 2017, Rome Memorial Hospital became an affiliate of St. Joseph's Health for easier access to specialty care. (In 2021 Rome Memorial Hospital adopted Rome Health as its new name to more accurately reflect the scope of services provided.)

In 2017, Auburn Community Hospital signed an agreement with St. Joseph's Health and the University of Rochester Medical Center (URMC) which allows for shared services while maintaining their independence. This includes retaining the name "Auburn Community Hospital" (ACH).
