= Samaritan Hospital (Troy, New York) =

New York (state) hospital system

- St. Peter's Health Partners, Northeast Health System

Geography
- Location: Troy, New York, United States
- Coordinates: 42°44′0″N 73°40′21″W

Organization
- Type: General

Services
- Beds: 238

History
- Opened: 1898

Links
- Website: www.sphp.com/location/samaritan-hospital
- Lists: Hospitals in New York State

Samaritan Hospital is a community hospital in Troy, New York, and a founding member of Northeast Health System and managed by St. Peter's Health Partners. The main campus is at 2215 Burdett Ave Troy, New York. A second campus is located at the site of the former St. Mary's Hospital, also in Troy, while a third campus is at Albany Memorial.

== History ==
Samaritan Hospital was founded in 1898, largely through the efforts of Dr. Edmund D. Ferguson. Located at Eighth Street, it moved to Burdett Avenue in 1914. George and Robert Cluett of Cluett, Coon & Co., manufacturers of men's shirt collars, erected and equipped the administration building, three pavilions, and the employees' building. The house for the nurses at the hospital training school was donated by Mary L. Thurman, daughter and heir of John R. Thurman, late director of the Sacket's Harbor and Saratoga Railroad. Frederick Forrest Peabody of Arrow Shirts provided the buildings and equipment for the laundry, heating, and electrical plants. A contagious ward building was isolated from the other buildings. Robert Cluett was vice-president of the hospital, and Peabody served on the building committee.

Samaritan was a founding members of Northeast Health System, along with St. Peter's Hospital (Albany, New York), Albany Memorial Hospital and Sunnyview Hospital and Rehabilitation Center (Schenectady).

== St. Mary's Hospital ==
=== History ===
Rev. Peter Havermans was the first pastor of St. Mary's Church in Troy, which was established in 1843. Most of his flock were starving Irish immigrants, and many ill with "ship fever". He spent a good part of his time ministering to the sick and began to raise funds to erect a city hospital. On August 15, 1848, General John E. Wool, a native of Troy, laid the cornerstone at a property at Washington and Fifth streets. The Troy Hospital opened in 1850, staffed by the Daughters of Charity. It shared the premises with Saint Mary's Female Orphan Asylum.

By the mid-1860s, the proximity of the Troy and Greenbush Railroad made the location unsuitable, and property was purchased on Eighth Street. On June 28, 1868 John J. Conroy, Bishop of Albany laid the cornerstone for a new hospital building. It moved to Oakwood Avenue in 1914, and was named St. Mary’s Hospital in 1949.

=== Merger ===
In 2019, St. Mary's merged with Samaritan to become Samaritan's St. Mary's campus for outpatient care. Programs at St.Mary's were renamed.(e.g., St. Mary’s Podiatry Services became Samaritan Hospital Podiatry Services.)

Samaritan Hospital School of Nursing is located at the St. Mary's campus. It offers a 2 year A.S. (Associate degree in Science).

Albany Memorial Hospital
- St. Peter's Health Partners (SPHP)

Geography
- Location: Albany, New York, United States

Organization
- Type: General

Services
- Beds: 165

History
- Opened: 1868

Links
- Lists: Hospitals in New York State

== Albany Memorial Hospital ==
Albany Memorial Hospital is located at 600 Northern Boulevard, Albany, NY.

=== History ===
Albany Memorial Hospital opened in 1868. It was Albany's dispensary for the city's indigent. It moved more than once, most recently in 1957.

Albany Memorial Hospital, St. Peter's Hospital (Albany, New York), Samaritan Hospital (Troy, New York), and Sunnyview Hospital and Rehabilitation Center (Schenectady) combined to form Northeast Health System. In 2011, Northeast merged with two other health systems to form St. Peter's Health Partners.

=== Merger ===
Albany Memorial is a 165-bed hospital In 2020, Albany Memorial merged with Samaritan Hospital to become Samaritan's third campus, Samaritan Hospital-Albany Memorial Campus. As it was cost-prohibitive to upgrade the aging East Wing of the campus, built in 1959, in order to meet modern health care needs, the old wing was demolished in mid 2021.
