= Sunnyview Hospital and Rehabilitation Center (Schenectady) =

New York (state) hospital system

Coordinates: 42.82114°N 73.91487°W

Geography
- Location: Schenectady, New York, United States

Links
- Lists: Hospitals in New York State

Sunnyview Hospital and Rehabilitation Center (also known as Sunnyview Rehabilitation Hospital in Schenectady, New York was established in 1928. Sunnyview was a founding member of Northeast Health System.

== History ==
Due to the efforts of Fire Chief Henry Yates and Kiwanis Club President Dr. Alfred Warner, the Schenectady Reconstruction Home for Crippled Children was incorporated on November 4, 1926. A ten-bed facility was constructed on Rosa Road, and opened in October 1928. The institution became known as "Sunnyview Hospital".

The following year Troy industrialist Ellis L. Rowe proposed to the hospital board that the hospital be reorganized to expand service to counties of Eastern New York. Eastern New York Orthopedic Hospital and School was incorporated on October 23, 1929 to supersede the former institution. Additional land was purchased at Rosa Road to allow for further expansion. Through the generosity of heiress and philanthropist Anna Electra Collins, Sunnyview expanded from 10 to 35 beds. The Anna E. Collins Memorial Building was dedicated May 19, 1937.

In 1955, research on clothing was moved from the Institute for Crippled and Disabled to Eastern New York Orthopedic Hospital and School (Sunnyview} and the Institute of Physical Medicine and Rehabilitation in New York City. They contributed to alleviating the difficulty of dressing with an approach that provided as few fastenings as absolutely necessary. They also called attention to the need for proper clothing selection for the handicapped in vocational schools.

"Since its founding, Sunnyview had been essentially a children’s orthopedic hospital with the primary admission being polio. Hospitals from a 23-county region transferred their polio patients to Sunnyview after the communicable phase of their disease was completed.." With the advent of vaccines, and a decrease in polio cases, in 1957 the Sunnyview board made the decided to change its mission to become a comprehensive rehabilitation hospital.

Sunnyview created the "Studio Arts Project" in June of 2002 to provide a program for disabled students that promotes creativity, independence, dignity, and community integration.

== Present day ==
In 2007, Sunnyview merged with Northeast Health System, receiving all acute rehabilitation referrals from Samaritan Hospital in Troy and Albany Memorial Hospital. Bed capacity increased to 115. Audiology services are provided by the Sunnyview Hearing Center, which has satellite offices in Guilderland and Latham.

In March 2017, the Jack Falvo III foundation established "Jack's Place". Modeled after Ronald McDonald House, it provides temporary accommodation for the families of children receiving medical treatment at local hospitals, including Sunnyview. Albany Medical Center's Jewish chaplain serves at Sunnyview as its interfaith chaplain.

== Ellis Hospital ==
Following the death of an Erie Canal barge tender, the city's first medical facility, the Schenectady Free Dispensary, opened in 1885. Eight years later, a new 30-bed hospital opened on Jay Street, through the charitable support of Charles G. Ellis, president of Schenectady Locomotive Works. In 1893, a hospital school was also established offering a three year course in professional nursing.

A new 60 bed hospital opened on October 16, 1906 at Nott Street and Rosa Road. On August 12, 1940, the first blood bank east of Chicago was established at Ellis. The hospital continued to expand and provide more services. In 2007 and June 2008, Ellis Hospital, the former Bellevue Woman's Hospital, and the former St. Clare's Hospital were joined to create "Ellis Medicine", a single, unified healthcare organization.

Sunnyview has long had a close co-operative relationship with Ellis. "It has long been an established tradition for the hospitals not to compete but to complement each other...The unique relationship included the joint building of the present boiler plant serving both hospitals."
