= Northeast Health System =

New York (state) hospital system

Northeast Health System, a network of hospitals, was formed by three upstate New York hospitals. In 2011, Northeast merged with two other health systems to form St. Peter's Health Partners.

== Member hospitals ==
- Albany Memorial Hospital,
- St. Peter's Hospital (Albany, New York),
- Samaritan Hospital (Troy, New York),
- Sunnyview Hospital and Rehabilitation Center (Schenectady).

The Northeast Health Foundation announced their new name and will be doing business as "Samaritan Hospital and The Eddy Foundation".

In 2011, Northeast Health System, St. Peter's Health Care Services, and Seton Health merged to form St. Peter's Health Partners.
