= Rome Memorial Hospital =

New York (state) hospital system

Coordinates: 43°13′45″N 75°26′33″W

Geography
- Location: Rome, New York, United States

Organization
- Network: St. Joseph's Health (Syracuse, New York)

Services
- Beds: 129

History
- Opened: 1884

Links
- Lists: Hospitals in New York State

Rome Memorial Hospital is a medical facility in Rome, New York. They also operate an 80-bed Skilled Nursing Facility and several outpatient centers.

== History ==
Rome Hospital opened in 1884 as a small cottage hospital. Dr. Thomas M. Flandrau and his wife, Clarissa Foote Flandrau, are credited as establishing the hospital when it was found that there were no facilities to treat the injured after a railroad accident. Passing trains caused the small building to vibrate, and in 1887 a new hospital was built on East Garden Street. A nursing school was added in 1905.

In 1920 a bequest from James A. Murphy led to the founding of a second hospital in the city, Murphy Memorial Hospital. It provided surgical services and treated patients with contagious diseases. In 1929 Murphy Memorial became a maternity hospital.

In 1940 the city combined the two hospitals with a new building at its current location and called it Rome hospital & Murphy Memorial Hospital. In 1976, the Bartlett Wing was added, named in honor of Dr. Robert L. Bartlett. In 1994, the city transferred ownership to a private, not-for-profit corporation, Rome Memorial Hospital.

In 2017 Rome Memorial became an affiliate of St. Joseph's Health for easier access to specialty care; it retains its own separate identity.

In 2018, Rome Memorial was one of seventeen upstate hospitals to take part in a pilot program to reduce the use of opioids in their emergency departments.

During the COVID-19 pandemic, their primary vaccination period for the first of two shots required was from late December 2020 thru mid January 2021. As COVID-19 cases continued to climb, Rome Memorial expressed its gratitude for the many donations of supplies received from the community.

As of 2020, Rome Memorial Hospital had 129 acute care beds, as well as accommodation for 80 residents in its skilled nursing facility; it serves about 6,000 patients a year.

In 2021 Rome Memorial Hospital adopted Rome Health as its new name to more accurately reflect the scope of services provided.
