= Carthage Area Hospital =

Hospital

Geography
- Location: Carthage, New York, United States
- Coordinates: 43°59′14″N 75°35′38″W

Organization
- Type: General

Services
- Beds: 25

History
- Opened: 1965

Links
- Lists: Hospitals in New York State

Carthage Area Hospital is named for its location, Carthage, New York, "a medically underserved area."

== History ==
Carthage, servicing and located in Jefferson County, is a 25-bed teaching hospital. They opened in 1965. Their expansions in 1995 and 2007 resulted in the hospital becoming "one of the largest employers within the area." Planning for another expansion began in 2018. U.S. News & World Report's overview of hospital described is as "a general medical and surgical facility" (it doesn't handle specialty areas such as Bariatric/Weight Control Services or Addiction Treatment Services).

In 2014 the hospital had a financial setback, and they laid off 20 percent of their workforce. In 2013 they opened Meadowbrook Terrace, an assisted living facility.

== Controversy ==
In 1992 the hospital was one of twelve hospitals which were "issued statements of deficiency" for improper performance of laparoscopic gallbladder surgery: "at least seven patients have died and 185 others have suffered serious or life-threatening complications."

In 2014, they "settled allegations of overbilling." This was an interim arrangement; in 2018 they "recovered $6.8 million in reimbursement money owed to it by the federal government."
