= St. Pius X Catholic Church (Cincinnati, Ohio) =

Historic church in Ohio, United States

- St. Patrick's Catholic Church
- U.S. National Register of Historic Places
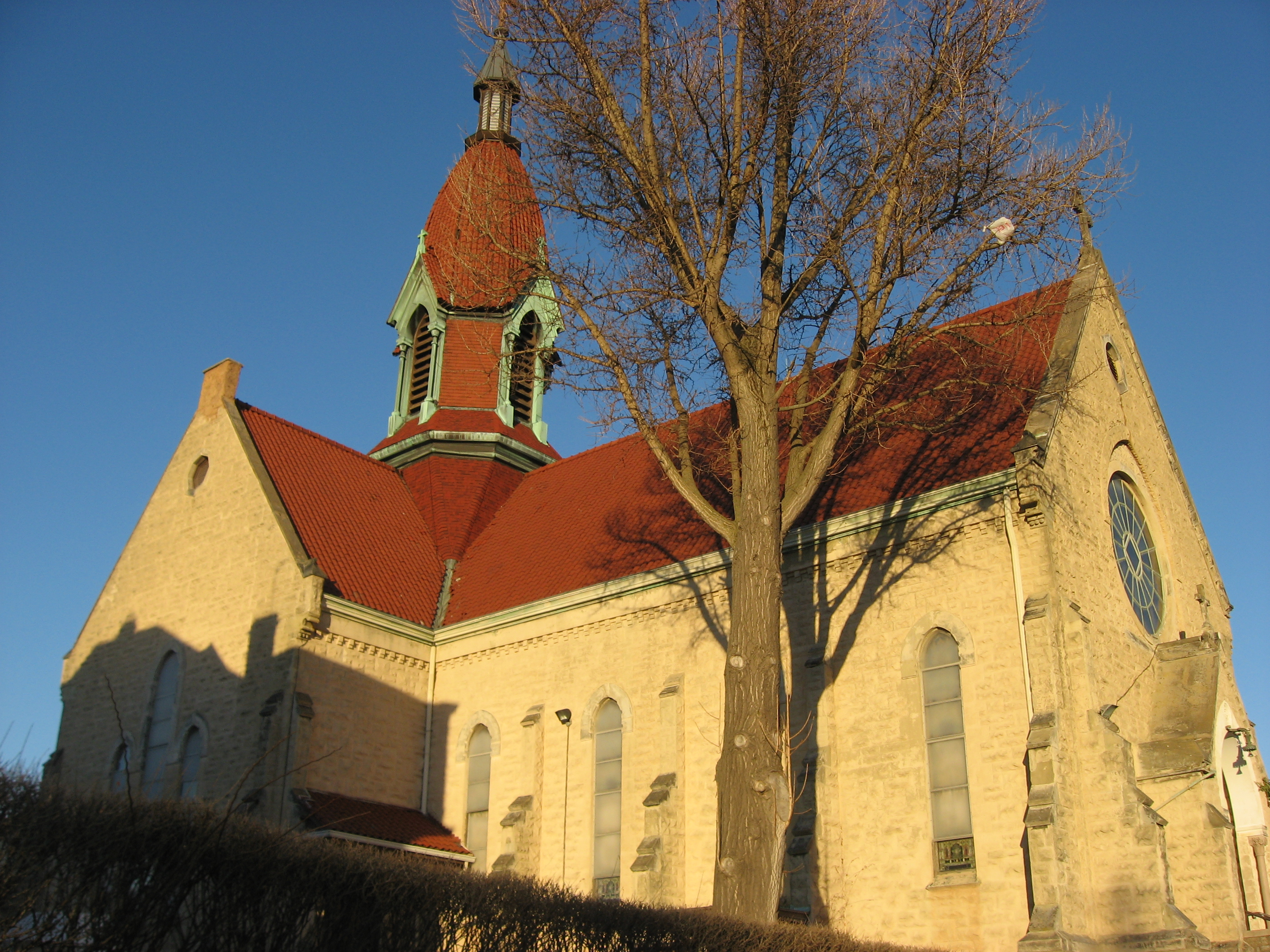
- Front and western side of the church

- Location within Ohio Location within the United States
- Location: Cincinnati, Ohio
- Coordinates: 39°9′37.60″N 84°32′32.71″W
- Architectural style: Romanesque
- NRHP reference No.: 78002081
- Added to NRHP: December 4, 1978

St. Pius X Catholic Church is a registered historic building in Cincinnati, Ohio, listed in the National Register on December 4, 1978. Located along Blue Rock Street, it was dedicated in 1879 to St. Patrick, and then in 1991 was dedicated to Pope Pius X by the Society of St. Pius X. Beginning in 2015, the building now houses a brewery, Urban Artifact.

== Historic uses ==
- Religious Structure
