= Bellevue Woman's Hospital =

Women's hospital in Niskayuna, New York

Bellevue Woman's Center
- Ellis Medicine

Geography
- Location: 2210 Troy–Schenectady Road, Niskayuna, New York, United States
- Coordinates: 42.79265°N 73.87898°W

Organization
- Care system: Private (nonprofit)
- Type: Specialist hospital

Services
- Beds: 40 (2012)

History
- Former names: Bellevue Maternity Hospital; Bellevue Woman's Hospital
- Opened: 1931

Links
- Lists: Hospitals in New York State

Bellevue Woman's Center is a specialty women's hospital operated by Ellis Medicine at 2210 Troy–Schenectady Road in Niskayuna, Schenectady County, New York. It provides maternity and women's health services and has long been a major facility for obstetric care in the Capital Region. In 2025, Ellis consolidated most outpatient surgical services away from the Bellevue campus and onto its main hospital campus (Ellis Hospital) on Nott Street in Schenectady, while stating that deliveries and cesarean sections would continue at Bellevue.

== Campuses and services ==
Bellevue Woman's Center's campus is separate from by operated by Ellis Medicine in Niskayuna. It also operates sites in Schenectady, such as the McClellan Street Health Center (624 McClellan Street).

It focuses on obstetric and gynecologic care. It is one of three Ellis Medicine campuses and is identified as the site for maternity and specialized care for women and infants. It operates a Level II neonatal intensive care unit and, in 2004, had 55 beds, about 2,200 deliveries, and roughly 2,000 ambulatory surgeries.

== History and services ==
=== Early development ===
Nurse Mary Grace (Jorgensen) founded Bellevue Maternity Hospital in 1931. In 1941, a house on Troy–Schenectady Road was converted for hospital use, and in 1973, a modern maternity care building was erected on that campus.

=== Berger Commission recommendation (2006) and outcome ===
In 2006, a New York State Commission on Health Care Facilities in the 21st Century (the "Berger Commission") described the facility as one of only two remaining nonprofit women's specialty hospitals in the United States. However, it recommended closing Bellevue's hospital operations and redistributing its services within Schenectady County.

=== Ellis Medicine era ===
Bellevue did not ultimately close. By July 2007, it had relinquished its operating license, and Ellis Hospital took over operations, but Bellevue continued to operate under its own name.

==== Service timeline ====
Sources:

- 1931 – Nurse Mary Grace (Jorgensen) founded Bellevue Maternity Hospital.
- 1941 – A house on Troy–Schenectady Road was converted for hospital use.
- 1973 – A modern maternity-care building was erected on the campus.
- 2006 – The Berger Commission recommended closing Bellevue's hospital operations and redistributing services within Schenectady County, while describing it as one of only two remaining nonprofit women's specialty hospitals in the United States.
- 2007 – Local reporting described Bellevue relinquishing its operating license and Ellis Hospital taking over operations, but the facility continued operating as a women's hospital under the Ellis system.
- 2012 – Ellis Medicine renovated and expanded the Bellevue campus. More than 2,500 babies were delivered there in 2011.
- 2013 – A county community health planning document described Bellevue as one of three Ellis Medicine campuses and identified it as the site for maternity and specialized care for women and infants.
- 2019 – Ellis Medicine consolidated same-day surgeries from the McClellan Street Health Center to other Ellis sites, including Bellevue and the Nott Street campus.
- 2025 – Ellis shifted most outpatient surgical services from Bellevue to Ellis Hospital's Nott Street campus while stating that deliveries and cesarean sections would continue at Bellevue, facing community opposition.
- 2026 – Ellis Medicine announced that Bellevue would establish a midwifery practice, supported by an $800,000 grant from the Mother Cabrini Health Foundation. The practice is planned to employ four midwives and begin offering services in fall 2026.

== See also ==
- Ellis Hospital
- List of hospitals in New York (state)
