= Sisters of St. Francis of Philadelphia =

Religious congregation in Pennsylvania

The Sisters of St. Francis of Philadelphia
- Headquarters: Aston, Pennsylvania
- Founder(s): Maria Anna Bachmann, Barbara Boll, Anna Dorn
- First Superior General: Mother Francis Bachmann (Maria Anna Boll)
- Patron Saint(s): St. Francis and St. Claire
- Affiliations: Neumann University, Intercommunity Peace and Justice Center, Mother Seton Academy, Transitions, The Catholic High School of Baltimore
- Website: https://osfphila.org/

The Sisters of St. Francis of Philadelphia is an Aston Township, Pennsylvania-based women's religious congregation of the Third Order of Saint Francis founded in 1855 by Bavarian immigrant Maria Anna Boll Bachmann. The congregation is known for its work in education and healthcare.

== History ==
=== 19th century ===
Maria Anna Boll Bachmann was a widow with four children, whose husband, Anthony, had died of injuries sustained due to anti-immigrant violence fomented by the American Nativist Party in Philadelphia. In the aftermath of her husband's death, Bachmann established a small shop and hostel for immigrant women in her home.

The Bishop of Philadelphia, John Neumann, had asked Pope Pius IX for permission to bring some German Dominican nuns to Philadelphia to educate the girls of his diocese. Instead, he was advised by the pope to establish a congregation of Franciscan Sisters. The new religious community was founded in April 1855 with Bachmann, her sister, Barbara Boll, and Anna Dorn, a member of the Third Order of Saint Francis residing at the hostel. Bachmann was named Mother Superior and given the religious name of Sister Mary Francis. They adopted the religious habit of a black tunic and veil, with the Franciscan cord and the Franciscan Crown which has seven decades, commemorating the Seven Joys of the Blessed Virgin Mary.

The Sisters nursed the sick and poor while supporting themselves by piecework sewing. During a smallpox epidemic in 1858, they continued to care for the sick in their patients’ homes or in their convent. In December 1860, the congregation opened its first hospital, St. Mary's in Philadelphia. In 1896, the Motherhouse was moved to Glen Riddle, Pennsylvania, and they became familiarly known as "the Glen Riddle Franciscans".

St. James' Protectory in Reybold, Delaware, was established by Thomas Albert Andrew Becker, the Bishop of Wilmington, in September 1879 as an orphanage for boys. It was run by the Sisters of St. Francis of Philadelphia. In 1891 the Sisters were called to Boston to staff St. Francis Home in Roxbury; The congregation staffed the institution until 1966.

In October 1890 the Sisters opened St. Joseph Orphanage in Spokane, Washington. That same year they also began teaching at St. Peter Claver in Baltimore, Maryland.

In 1892, at the request of Katharine Drexel, six Sisters left Philadelphia to staff a school at St. Stephens Mission on the Wind River Indian Reservation in Wyoming. The mission had been established by the Jesuits in 1884.

=== 20th century ===
During the influenza pandemic of 1918 in Baltimore, the community lost eight Sisters and a candidate.

In 1939, the congregation opened the Catholic High School of Baltimore in Maryland; they continue to sponsor the school. The school is incorporated as a separate legal entity with a governing board that includes lay women and men and Sisters of St. Francis of Philadelphia.

In 1965, the Sisters founded Our Lady of Angels College in Aston Township, Pennsylvania. In 1980, the name was changed to Neumann College in 1980 in honor of John Neumann, their founder, and became Neumann University in 2009.

In 1976, control of the school at the St. Stephen Mission in Wyoming was turned over to the Arapaho. The Sisters continued to serve at the mission until 1981.

In the 1970s, St. Joseph Orphanage in Spokane became St. Joseph Children's Home, and ceased operations in 1982 when the state changed its policy to a preference for foster homes. The premises then housed St. Joseph Family Center, offering counseling programs until it also closed in 2016 due to financial considerations.

=== 21st century ===
At the start of the century, there were nearly 800 Sisters of St. Francis of Philadelphia serving in 88 missions in 19 dioceses. At its height in 1958, the congregation had numbered 1,600 Sisters working in schools, hospitals, and in social services.

In 2003, the Franciscan Sisters of Ringwood (F.S.R.) merged with the Sisters of St. Francis of Philadelphia. They had been founded as the Capuchin Sisters of the Infant Jesus in Newark, New Jersey, in 1911 by Angela Clara Pesce to serve the Italian-speaking population of New Jersey, where they ran various schools. Their motherhouse was by then located in Ringwood, New Jersey.

In 2007, the Sisters of St. Francis became a co-sponsor, along with the Archdiocese of Philadelphia, Neumann University, and St. Katherine Drexel Parish to form Drexel Neumann Academy in Chester, Pennsylvania. It replaced St. Katharine Drexel School, which closed in 2005, and was the last Catholic school in the city.

In the summer of 2021, Neumann University entered into an agreement to purchase the contiguous Our Lady of Angels Motherhouse for dormitory space. Some Franciscan Sisters will continue to reside on the premises. The congregation retains the Assisi House retirement convent; Red Hill Farm, a member-supported community farm; and the Franciscan Spiritual Center. The congregation retains the Assisi House retirement convent; Red Hill Farm, a member-supported community farm; and the Franciscan Spiritual Center.

As of 2022, the congregation includes about 355 sisters in 19 states, as well as in Ireland and Africa. They serve in a variety of ministries: prayer ministry; parish and diocesan ministry; spiritual and pastoral care; service to the elderly, the homeless, the poor, persons with AIDS, and immigrants and refugees. The motherhouse is currently located in Aston Township, Pennsylvania. There is also a program called "Franciscan Companions" for members of the laity to participate in the congregation's service of prayer and ministry.

== Tau Symbol ==
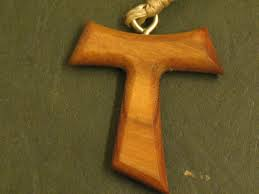
A wooden Tau attached to a necklace.

The main symbol for the Sisters of St. Francis of Philadelphia is the Tau. For Franciscans, the Tau represents Eucharist, voluntary conversion, and the Crusades. St. Francis turned the symbol into one of penance and Jesus's passion. It also acts as a reminder to serve all people, including those typically ignored by society. The Sisters of St. Francis of Philadelphia, and various other Franciscan orders, use the Tau.

== Assisi House ==
The Assisi House is a retirement home located in Aston, Pennsylvania, near the Our Lady of Angels Convent and the Motherhouse. It is a multifaceted center equipped to care for sisters afflicted with illness and mental disorders, such as Alzheimer's or Dementia. There is dedicated time for prayers, liturgies, and the rosary. The retired sisters at Assisi House make sandwiches for the poor and homeless of Philadelphia.

== Related congregations ==
The Sisters of St. Francis of Philadelphia was the founding congregation of daughter communities: the Sisters of St Francis of Syracuse (1860) and the Sisters of St. Francis Third Order Regular of Buffalo (Williamsville Franciscans) (1863). The Buffalo community, in turn, founded the Sisters of St. Francis of Millvale.

In November 2003, the latter two merged. In 2007, all three merged to form the Sisters of St. Francis of the Neumann Communities.

St. Joseph Hospital in Tacoma, Washington was established in 1891; it is now St. Joseph Medical Center, a Level II trauma center.
