= VCU Center for Rehabilitation Science and Engineering =

Coordinates: 37.540276°N 77.429210°W

The Virginia Commonwealth University (VCU) Center for Rehabilitation Science and Engineering (CERSE) is a comprehensive, interdisciplinary, University-approved Center of Excellence furthering the science and serving the needs of persons with disabilities. CERSE is administrated and coordinated by the Department of Physical Medicine and Rehabilitation, funded through the VCU Office of Research, the School of Medicine, the Department of Physical Medicine and Rehabilitation (PM&R), and the Virginia Department of Rehabilitative Services (DRS). CERSE serves as the mechanism for coordination, consolidation, and support of evidence based disability research endeavors from multiple schools and departments at VCU and a number of affiliate organizations. In partnership with the clinical services provided through the VCU Medical Center, the Hunter Holmes McGuire VA Medical Center (VAMC), Sheltering Arms Rehabilitation Programs, VCU Children’s Hospital of Richmond, the U.S. Navy, the U.S. Marine Corps and other affiliated programs, CERSE has brought together researchers, clinicians, rehabilitation specialists, therapists, and academicians from the numerous backgrounds and specialties. These collaborations optimize resources, avoid duplication of effort, and increase the capacity to successfully compete for high-level grant and foundation funding. CERSE is currently composed of seven Research Cores built on the strength of existing disability research and training:

1. Neurorehabilitation
2. Musculoskeletal and Pain Rehabilitation
3. Employment and Economic Outcomes
4. Defense and Veterans Rehabilitation
5. Pediatric Rehabilitation
6. Rehabilitation Engineering and Technology
7. Health Disparities

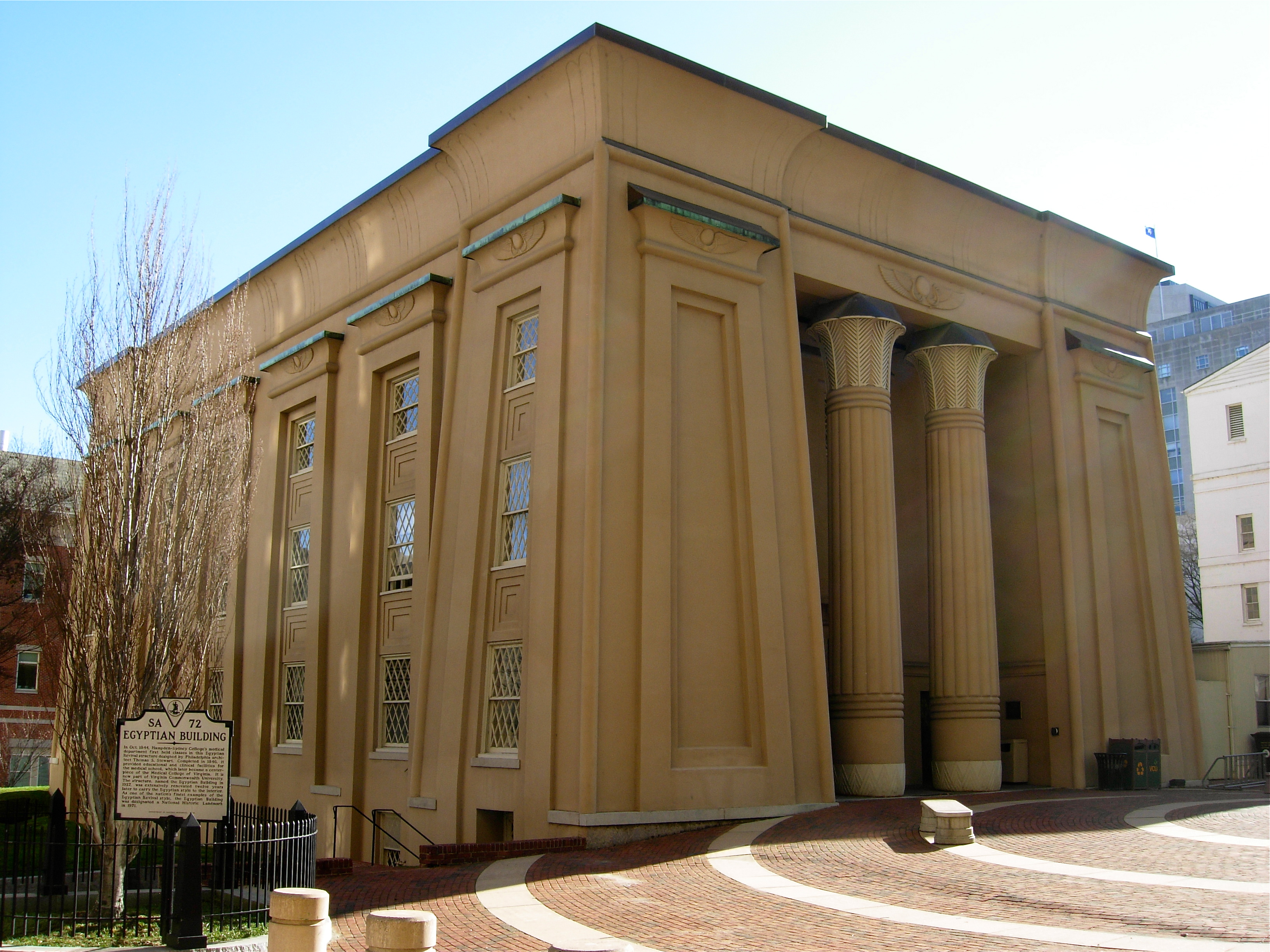
CERSE is housed in part in the Egyptian Building on the VCU MCV Campus

Scholars from each of these areas are actively engaged in numerous on-going research efforts. Additionally, CERSE has developed an integrated research development service to support rehabilitation research with a variety of supports and activities. CERSE has numerous on-going training and knowledge translation efforts, and an emerging development and fundraising effort.

== Organization and governance ==
CERSE is currently housed an operated within the VCU Department of Physical Medicine and Rehabilitation. Substantive funding for CERSE comes from both this department, the Dean’s Office of the School of Medicine and the Office of the Vice President for Research. The Dean of the School of Medicine, Peter Buckley serves as the senior university administrator for CERSE. He is responsible for space, budget appropriations, and management for CERSE. As a VCU Board of Visitors approved center, CERSE also comes under the purview of the Vice President for Research, Francis L. Macrina, who is responsible for budget appropriations, guidance, and oversight of CERSE. The interim executive director, Paul Wehman is the primary administrative officer of CERSE. He is responsible for the overall direction and activities of CERSE, is the final authority on day to day activities, and is ex officio chair of the CERSE Administrative Leadership Team.

== Administrative leadership team ==
The CERSE Administrative Leadership Team acts as an advisory board to the center, providing the Executive Director with suggestions and feedback on day to day operations. The Administrative Leadership Team also provides a springboard for long term planning. In an effort to represent the university-wide orientation of CERSE, the Administrative Leadership Team consists both of CERSE principals as well as faculty from both campuses. Current members of the team are:

- Paul Wehman, Ph.D. – Interim Executive Director
- Edmund O. Acevedo, Ph.D., Professor and Chair, Department of Health and Human Performance, Director of CERSE Muskuloskeletal and Pain Rehabilitation Core
- Jeffrey Kreutzer, Ph.D., Professor, Department of Physical Medicine & Rehabilitation, Director of CERSE Neurorehabilitation Core
- Brian McMahon, Ph.D., Associate Dean, Research for the School of Allied Health Professions, Professor, Department of Rehabilitation Counseling
- Paul Wetzel, Ph.D., Professor, Department of Biomedical Engineering
