= Leslie Burchart =

American serial killer

- Born: Leslie Leon Burchart; August 3, 1949; Richmond, Virginia, U.S.
- Died: August 1, 2002 (aged 52); Lonesome Pine Hospital, Big Stone Gap, Virginia, U.S.
- Other name: "The Golden Years Murderer"
- Convictions: Murder x7 Burglary; Indecent exposure
- Penalty: Life imprisonment x5 (2000); 105 years (1996)

Details
- Victims: 3–7+
- Span of crimes: 1994 – 1996 (confirmed); 1990 – 1996 (alleged)
- Country: United States
- State: Virginia
- Date apprehended: For the final time in July 1996

Leslie Leon Burchart (August 3, 1949 – August 1, 2002) was an American serial killer who killed three homeless men and wounded a fourth in Richmond, Virginia, from 1994 to 1996. He was convicted and sentenced to life imprisonment for these crimes, but not long after, he confessed to killing four women as part of the so-called Golden Years Murders.

He later recanted his confessions and denied responsibility, and since there has been no physical evidence linking him to the murders, Burchart's involvement in the serial murders remains questionable. He died behind bars for his original convictions in 2002.

== Early life ==
Leslie Leon Burchart was born on August 3, 1949, in Richmond's Southside, into a family with two other children. In the mid-1950s, his mother was diagnosed with schizophrenia, as a result of which his father divorced her and remarried. Subsequently, Burchart and his siblings were raised by their father and stepmother, in what was described as a mostly happy environment. According to neighbors, however, Burchart's stepmother resented him and his siblings and would act heartlessly towards them – one example given was that she locked them out of the house during thunderstorms. In the late 1960s, Burchart's father, who worked as a physical therapist, found a job at the Hunter Holmes McGuire Veterans Administration Medical Center in Richmond, Virginia, where he and his family soon relocated to.

For the remainder of teenage years, Burchart lived an ordinary life and did not exhibit any criminal behavior. After graduation, he worked in a number of professions, but his mental health began to rapidly deteriorate following the 1970s energy crisis, forcing him to work in low-skilled labor to survive. From 1977 to 1982, he worked at the Richmond Reference Desk. Starting in 1978, he was diagnosed with a mental illness and until his final arrest in 1996, he periodically received treatment at the Richmond Mental Health Clinic.

In the mid-1980s, Burchart's mental state deteriorated sharply, prompting him to quit his job, lose his house and be left homeless. As a result, he embraced a vagrant lifestyle and spent the majority of his time socializing with fellow vagrants. In 1992, Burchart was arrested on charges of trespassing and indecent exposure after a young student at the University of Richmond contacted police claiming that he had been harassing her. In September of that year, he was convicted and sentenced to six months imprisonment, which he served at the Richmond County Jail.

During his incarceration, Burchart experienced hallucinations, claimed to hear voices of unspecified origin and plugged his ears with pieces of toilet paper. After assaulting a security guard, he was transferred to the Richmond Psychiatric Hospital in February 1993, where he was diagnosed with schizophrenia and prescribed high doses of Moban and Cogentin. A second examination deemed him incompetent for re-adaptation into civil society, and so, in November of that year, Burchart was transported to a nursing home for the mentally ill. He escaped the facility a few months later, and for the following two years he continued to live as a vagrant, making a living by selling scrap metal and committing petty thefts.

== Murders ==
In July 1996, Burchart was arrested for trespassing and lodged in the county jail. During the interrogation, he unexpectedly told investigators that he had committed three murders and several assaults. The first of these killings was the June 1994 murder of 35-year-old Montaque Dewitt Winston, a homeless man whom he strangled after the latter failed to pay him back $275 for marijuana. Burchart's second victim was 46-year-old Gary Wayne Shelton, another homeless man who he had beaten and then crushed his skull with a blunt object inside an abandoned cart on June 14, 1996. On June 29, he met 42-year-old carpenter John Wade Pleasants, who invited him to drink at his rental apartment. Burchart claimed that he beat and strangled him to death after the pair got into an argument. In addition to these murders, Burchart claimed responsibility for a non-fatal assault on a homeless woman in early 1996, in which the victim suffered a severe head injury that resulted in 36 skull fractures, but she managed to survive.

Later that year, Burchart was put on trial for the crimes, swiftly convicted and sentenced to 105 years imprisonment. Three years into his sentence, he contacted the Richmond Police Department and claimed responsibility for the murders of four elderly women: 55-year-old Jane Foster; 69-year-old Elizabeth Seibert; 84-year-old Mamie Verlander and 75-year-old Lucille Boyd, all of whom had been killed between January 1 and April 23, 1996. They were considered victims of the so-called "Golden Years Murders", in which at least thirteen elderly women were killed in Richmond's West End from 1990 to 1996. During interrogations, Burchart described details that authorities alleged only the killer would know and claimed to have frequented the same shops and restaurants as some of the victims. He later pleaded guilty to the four murders and was given an additional five life terms to be served consecutively with his 105-year sentence. In addition, he was given an additional 20-year sentence for burglary.

== Death ==
After his conviction, Burchart was transferred to serve his sentence at the Wallens Ridge State Prison. In the early 2000s, he began suffering from health issues and was diagnosed with a myriad of cardiovascular diseases. On July 30, 2002, his condition declined rapidly and he was transferred to Lonesome Pine Hospital in Big Stone Gap, where he died on August 1, just two days shy of his 53rd birthday.

== Aftermath ==
In November 2013, retired police detective Ron Reed, who had been involved in Burchart's arrest and conducted interviews with him, stated his belief that Burchart had likely killed many more people than those he was convicted of. Among those he named as likely victims were 81-year-old Rachel Henshaw, who died at a nursing home in Richmond on June 20, 1996, and 47-year-old William R. Merrill, a homeless man whom Burchart had supposedly strangled with his own shirt on the street on June 18. Reed also claimed that his supervisor had forced him to classify Burchart's testimony, as the higher-ups feared that even more negative publicity would ruin the department entirely.

A few days later, representatives from the Richmond Police Department released a statement denying the claims, but indeed admitted that Henshaw and Merrill had died in June 1996. According to them, however, there was no sign of foul play in either death, as forensic analysis had determined that Henshaw had died of natural causes while Merrill died from alcohol poisoning.

As of January 2025, the majority of the murders remain unsolved and Burchart's guilt remains in question. If he was indeed responsible for killing the victims he admitted to, there is a possibility that the remaining cases were perpetrated by unrelated offenders.

== See also ==
- List of serial killers in the United States
