= Virginia Commonwealth University =

Public university in Richmond, Virginia, U.S.

- Latin: Virginia rei Publicae Universitates
- Motto: Effice ut sit Realis (Latin)
- Motto in English: "Make it Real"
- Type: Public research university
- Established: October 20, 1838; 188 years ago
- Accreditation: SACS
- Academic affiliations: CUMU; GCU; ORAU; USU; SCHEV; Sea-grant
- Endowment: $3.23 billion (2025)
- President: Michael Rao
- Provost: Arturo Saavedra
- Rector: Ellen Fitzsimmons
- Students: 28,919 (2021–22)
- Undergraduates: 21,707 (2021–22)
- Postgraduates: 7,212 (2021–22)
- Location: Richmond, Virginia, United States; 37.5466°N 77.4533°W
- Campus: 150 acres (0.61 km^{2}); Midsize city
- Newspaper: The Commonwealth Times
- Colors: Black and gold
- Nickname: Rams
- Sporting affiliations: NCAA Division I – A-10
- Mascot: Rodney the Ram
- Website: vcu.edu

Virginia Commonwealth University (VCU) is a public research university in Richmond, Virginia, United States. VCU was founded in 1838 as the medical department of Hampden–Sydney College, becoming the Medical College of Virginia (MCV) in 1854. In 1968, the Virginia General Assembly merged MCV with the Richmond Professional Institute, founded in 1917, to create Virginia Commonwealth University. In 2025, more than 29,280 students were enrolled in more than 200 academic programs, and 23 VCU programs were ranked among U.S. News & World Report’s top 50 best college programs.

VCU Medical Center is ranked the number one hospital in Virginia according to U.S. News & World Report. The VCU Health System supports health care education, research, and patient care.

In 2025, VCU surpassed the $560 million mark in sponsored research funding for the first time. VCU has doubled research funding over the past seven years with a goal of doubling again to reach $1 billion. VCU's athletic teams compete in NCAA Division I and are collectively known as the VCU Rams. They are members of the Atlantic 10 Conference. The VCU campus includes historic buildings such as the Egyptian Building, the White House of the Confederacy and the Ginter House, now used by the school's provost.

== History ==
VCU's history began in 1838 when the Medical Department of Hampden-Sydney College opened in Richmond, Virginia. In 1844, it moved into its first permanent home, the Egyptian Building. In 1854, the Medical Department of Hampden–Sydney College received an independent charter from the Virginia General Assembly and became the Medical College of Virginia (MCV). A few years later in 1860, MCV conveyed all its property to the Commonwealth of Virginia and becomes a state institution in exchange for $30,000.

As the Civil War began, Richmond became a focal point for battle and politics. After a long siege, Ulysses S. Grant captured Petersburg and Richmond in early April 1865. As the fall of Petersburg became imminent, on Evacuation Sunday (April 2), President Davis, his cabinet, and the Confederate defenders abandoned Richmond and fled south. The retreating soldiers were under orders to set fire to bridges, the armory, and supply warehouses as they left. The fire in the largely abandoned city spread out of control, and along with Union shelling, large parts of Richmond, and virtually all MCV buildings, were destroyed. The city surrendered the next day; Union troops put out the raging fires in the city. Because of the worthless Confederate currency and high inflation, the medical school sold its ambulance horse for enough money to continue operation.

After the Civil War MCV participated significantly in medical advances, including in anesthesia and antisepsis. In 1893, the College of Physicians and Surgeons, later University College of Medicine, was established by Hunter Holmes McGuire, Confederate General "Stonewall" Jackson's friend and personal doctor who had amputated Jackson's arm, just three blocks away from MCV. In 1912, McGuire Hall opened as the new home of the University College of Medicine. The following year, MCV and UCM merged through the efforts of George Ben Johnston and Stuart McGuire. MCV acquired the Memorial Hospital as a result of the merger.

Richmond Professional Institute traces its roots back to 1917, when it began as the Richmond School of Social Work and Public Health. In 1925, it became the Richmond division of The College of William & Mary. In 1939, this division became the Richmond Professional Institute of The College of William & Mary (RPI). In 1947, the MCV Foundation was incorporated and in 1962 RPI separated from William & Mary to become an independent state institution. Then in 1968, state legislation (Wayne Commission Report) merged MCV and RPI to become Virginia Commonwealth University. Descendant of Thomas Jefferson, Pulitzer Prize winner and editor of the Richmond Times-Dispatch, Virginius Dabney was named the first Rector of VCU and went on to write Virginia Commonwealth University: A Sesquicentennial History.

=== Expansion ===
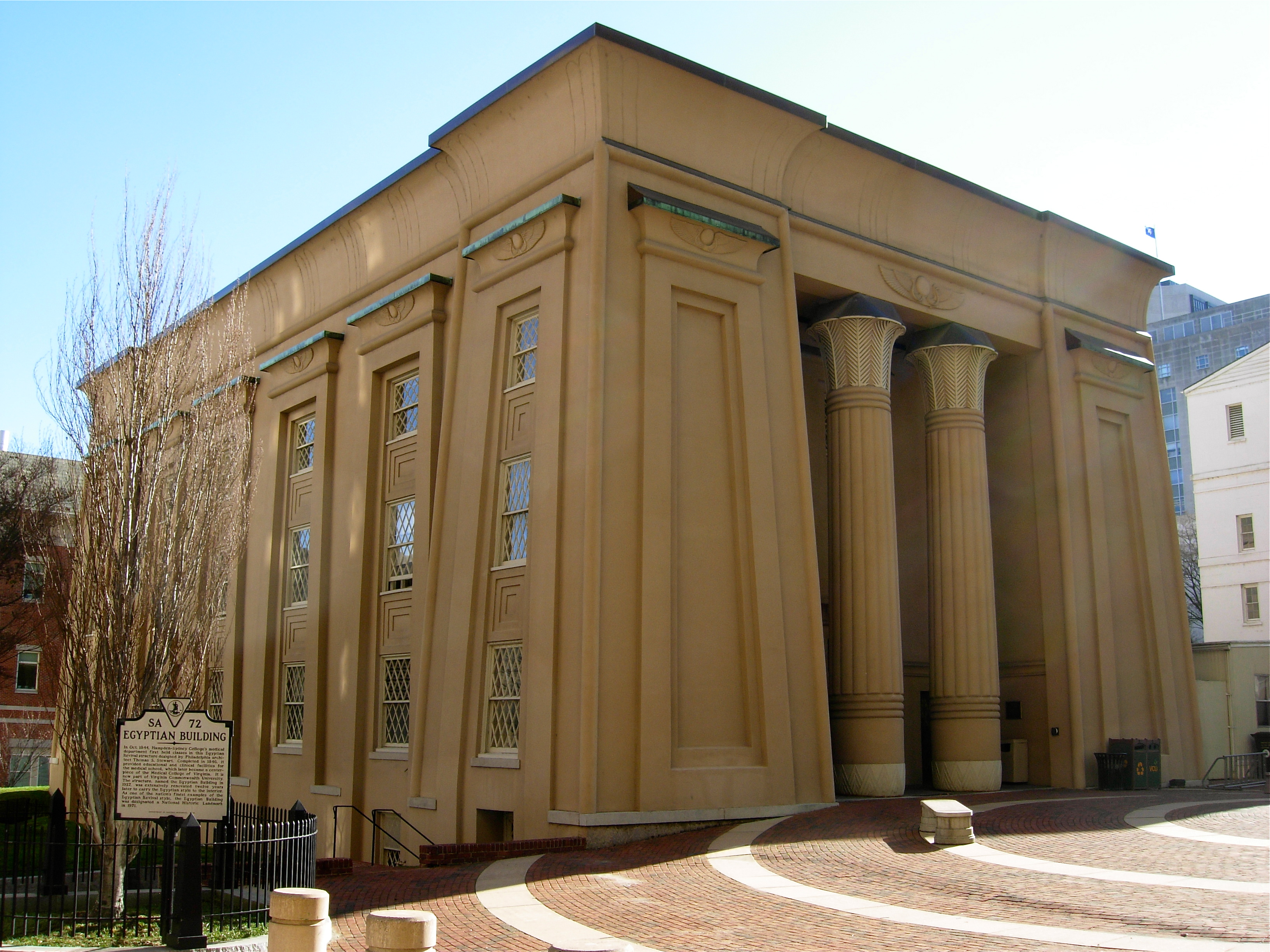
The Egyptian Building

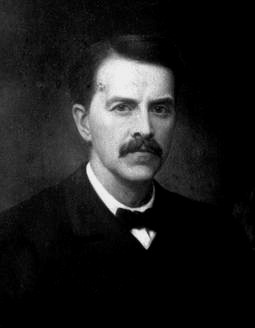
Hunter Holmes McGuire

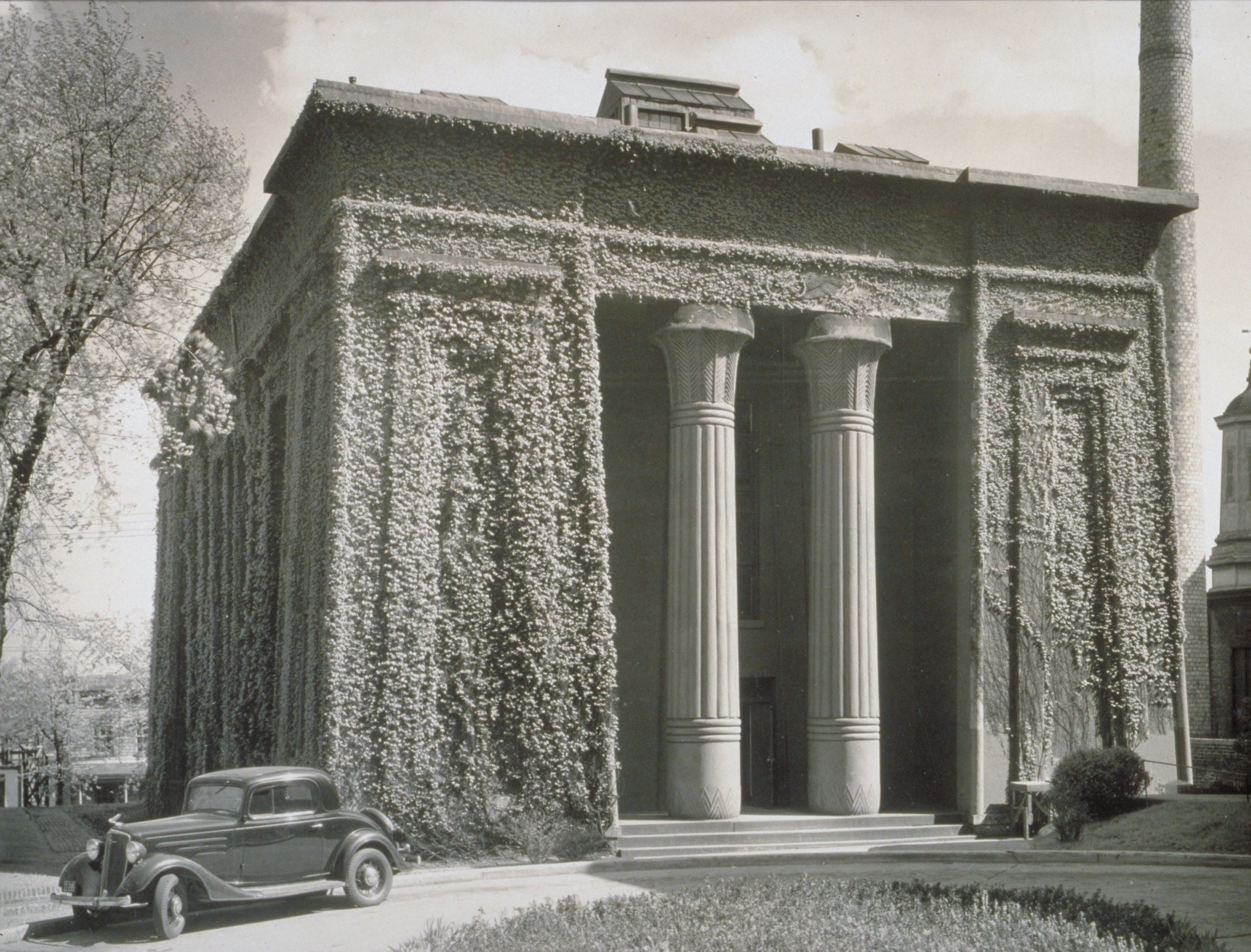
The Egyptian Building in the early 20th century

Warren W. Brandt was the first president of VCU. During his tenure, 32 degree programs were added, and the School of Allied Health Professions and the School of Community Services were established. In addition, more than $20 million of new construction was completed or initiated on both campuses, including the James Branch Cabell Library, Rhoads Hall, the School of Business building, the Larrick Student Center and a large addition to Sanger Hall.

In the 1980s, and under the leadership of VCU President Edmund Ackell, a major overhaul of the university's governance system and administrative structure was initiated. Ackell lead the administration in instituting a new system for both short-range and long-range university planning; establishing faculty convocation and a new set of faculty tenure and promotion guidelines; and establishing greater access to the community by supporting the use of the university's research and educational resources to meet social needs. Eugene Trani became the president of VCU in 1990. During his tenure VCU became one of the largest universities in Virginia, growing from an enrollment of 21,764 in 1990, to 32,284 at the time of his retirement. VCU was the state's first university to enroll over 30,000 students. Under Trani's leadership VCU and the VCU Health System undertook more than $2.2 billion in capital construction and renovation projects.

Michael Rao was appointed the fifth president of VCU in 2009. President Rao oversaw a major expansion in enrollment, funding and facilities at VCU. The construction of the Engineering Research and STEM buildings solidified VCU's strategy of becoming a leading scientific university. In 2022, VCU received a $104 million gift, the largest in university history, to support a new Stravitz-Sanyal Institute for Liver Disease and Metabolic Health. In 2025, VCU surpassed the $560 million mark in sponsored research funding for the first time, and has been designated a top 50 university by the National Science Foundation for research expenditures since 2023.

In 2010, VCU received a $20 million National Institutes of Health grant to join a nationwide consortium of research institutions working to turn laboratory discoveries into treatments for patients. The Clinical and Translational Science Award made VCU the only academic health center in Virginia to join the CTSA network. In 2011, the university's Carnegie classification was changed to "Very High Research Activity," with over 255 million in sponsored research. Three years later, VCU was awarded a $62 million federal grant to oversee a national research consortium of universities, hospitals, and clinics to study what happens to service members and veterans who suffer mild traumatic brain injuries or concussions.

In 2018, a series of protests by adjunct faculty were held at VCU over low pay and no benefits. Ahead of the 2018-19 budget, $4.2 million was allocated to increase adjunct faculty funding from $800 to $1,000 per credit hour, about $1,000 less than what the coalition was demanding. The administration implemented a campus plan which featured a campus green, arts building, dormitories, general student facilities, and renovations of the historic buildings on campus.

Students at VCU took part in the 2024 pro-Palestinian protests on university campuses, assembling an encampment in front of the school library in April 2024. After roughly 12 hours, VCU, Richmond and state police violently dispersed the encampment, pepper spraying students and using riot shields and smoke bombs to disperse students and destroy the encampment's temporary structures. VCU closed the library, which is ordinarily open until 3 AM, while the encampment was being dispersed, and locked students inside of it. 13 students were arrested and charged with unlawful assembly, but the charges were later dropped. VCU revised its campus policies in the aftermath of the encampment protest, banning forms of political expression including the use of sidewalk chalk and gatherings of more than 50 people without the university's permission. In 2025, two student leaders had their degrees withheld. One of the students was given her degree back after appealing the disciplinary charges against her.

== Campuses ==
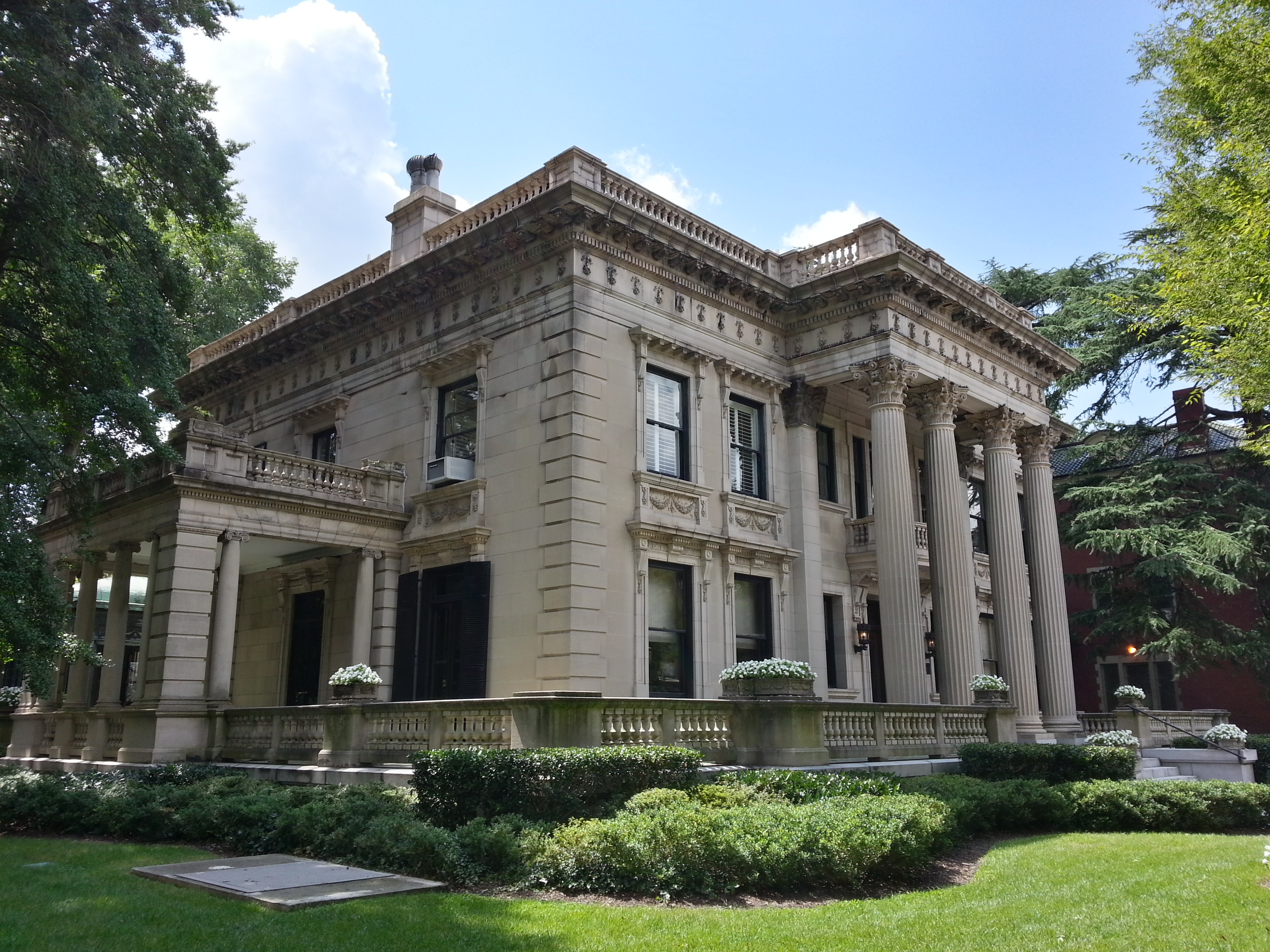
Scott House

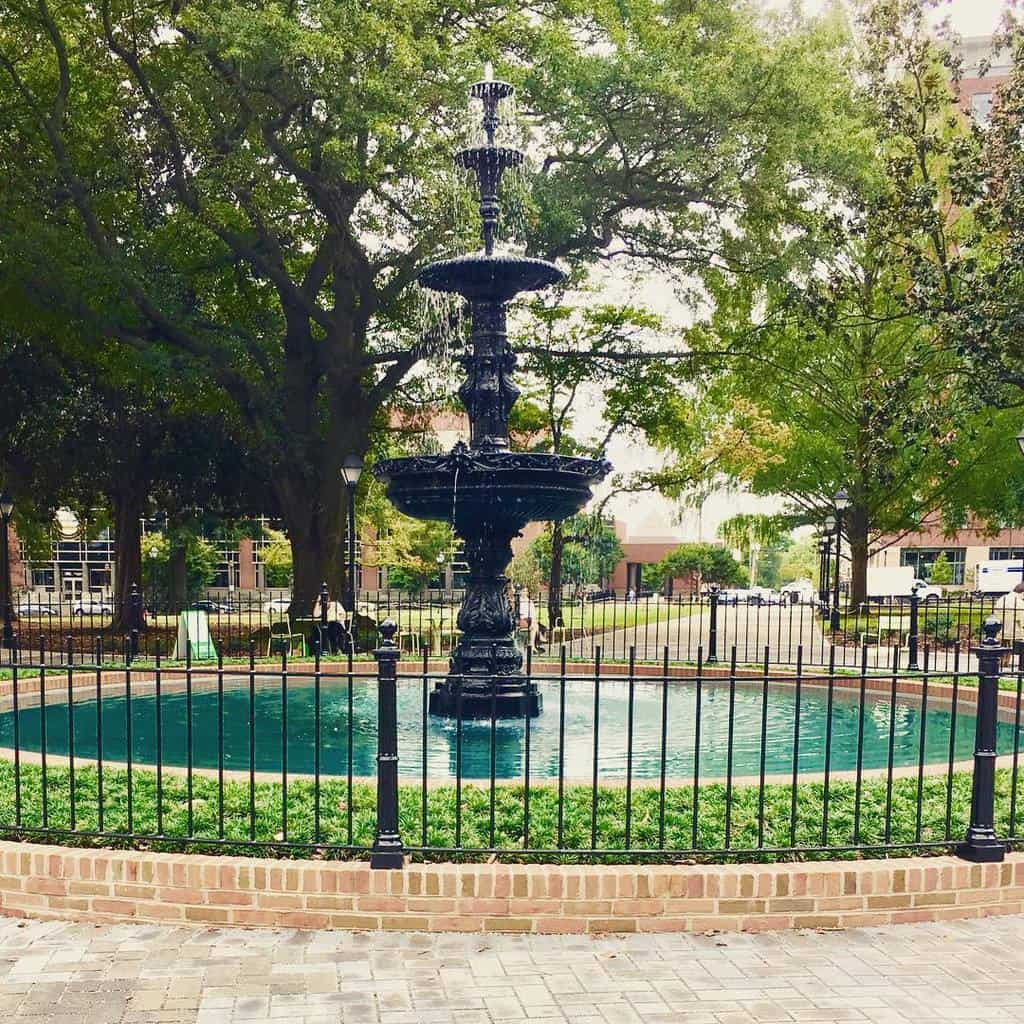
Monroe Fountain

Virginia Commonwealth University has two main campuses in Richmond, Va.: the Monroe Park Campus, located west of downtown Richmond, and the MCV Campus in the urban center. Additionally, VCU has a branch campus in Education City, Doha, Qatar, along with numerous regional facilities.

=== Monroe Park Campus ===
Named after the city park (see Monroe Park), the 90.6-acre (36.7 ha) Monroe Park Campus took its name in June 2004, replacing the former name, the Academic Campus of VCU. The Monroe Park Campus houses most of VCU's general education facilities, and is situated on the eastern end of the Fan district, a historic, late 19th-century neighborhood adjacent to downtown Richmond. Prior to the merger of the Richmond Professional Institute and the Medical College of Virginia, the campus was the home to the entire Richmond Professional Institute. Today, the campus has a mixture of modern and vintage buildings, with over 40 structures built before 1900.

=== MCV Campus ===
The 52.3-acre (21.2 ha) MCV Campus is home to the VCU Medical Center, which includes the Schools of Medicine, Dentistry, Pharmacy, Nursing, Public Health, the VCU College of Health Professions, and the medical center, which is overseen by the VCU Health System Authority. The campus is also home to the Massey Cancer Center (an NCI-designated Cancer Center) and the Children's Hospital of Richmond at VCU. The MCV Campus is an integral part of Richmond in the old Court End district. The neighborhood is located adjacent to the city's business and financial district near the state capitol. VCU's Health Sciences schools are the College of Health Professions, the School of Dentistry, the School of Medicine, the School of Nursing, the School of Pharmacy, and the School of Public Health.

=== VCU satellite and research locations ===
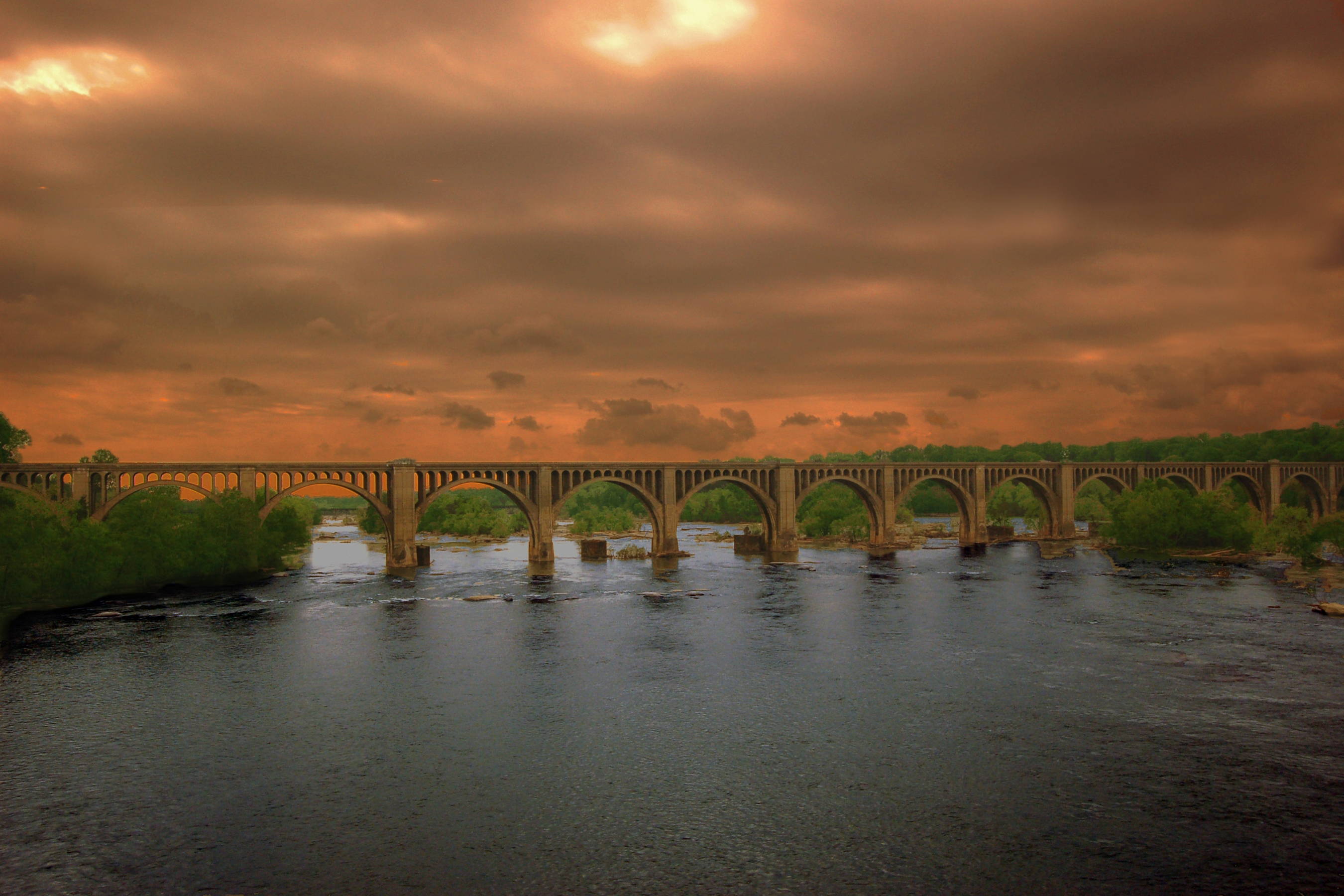
- The James River which runs next to VCU.
  Virginia Bio-Technology Research Park was incorporated in May 1992 as a joint initiative of Virginia Commonwealth University (VCU), the City of Richmond and the Commonwealth of Virginia. The research park is home to more than 60 life science companies, research institutes and state/federal labs, employing more than 2,200 scientists, engineers and researchers.
- VCU Rice Rivers Center for Environmental Life Sciences is located on 494 acres (200 ha) along the James River. The center has a primary focus of research on the science and policy of large rivers and their fringing riparian and wetland landscapes.
- VCU Medical Center at Stony Point, in southwestern Richmond
- VCU School of Medicine Inova Campus
- VCU School of Pharmacy Inova Campus
- VCU School of Pharmacy University of Virginia Division

=== VCUarts Qatar ===
VCUarts Qatar is VCU School of the Arts' branch campus located in the State of Qatar. It was established in 1998 through a partnership with Qatar Foundation and was the first university to open its doors in Education City. The contract was renewed in July 2012 and goes through July 2022. VCUarts Qatar offers the Bachelor of Fine Arts and Master of Fine Arts degrees. As part of the contract, VCU is not allowed to open any other degree-granting arts or design programs in other Middle Eastern countries. VCUarts Qatar is accredited by National Association of Schools of Art & Design, The Southern Association of Colleges and Schools and Council for Interior Design Accreditation.

VCU is not the only US campus in Education City, and it, along with the other universities, are the subject of criticism of their implicit acceptance of Qatar's alleged ties to extremism and human rights concerns.

== Organization ==
The Virginia Commonwealth University entity is structured as two organizations, the university and the Virginia Commonwealth University Health System. The president is VCU's Chief Executive Officer, and the school is organized into twenty divisions.

There are sixteen members of the board of visitors. The governor of Virginia can select board members. There are six non-voting members who are students and faculty. The VCU Health System has a separate board of directors composed of many local and national healthcare leaders.

There are more than 27,000 employees at VCU and VCU Health, including 12,280 university employees and 2,464 full-time faculty. VCU has an endowment of $3.23 billion, which is the second largest endowment for a public school in Virginia. Funding is received from the state and federal governments and private donations. In 2025, VCU reached a record $560 million in sponsored research funding, and VCU and its health system received $257 million in donations in 2025 from more than 22,000 donors, its second-largest fundraising total and a $100 million increase from 2021 totals.

VCU received a $104 million gift, the largest in university history, to support a new Stravitz-Sanyal Institute for Liver Disease and Metabolic Health. Local businesses including all Fortune 500 companies in Richmond make regular contributions to VCU such as endowed chairs, like the Philip Morris Chair, and donations for facilities. Altria, the largest tobacco company in the United States, has made frequent donations throughout VCU's history. In 2022, the Commonwealth of Virginia awarded VCU most of the funding for a $253 million arts and innovation building. In 2023, CoStar Group donated $18 million for an arts and innovation room at VCU's new consolidated arts building.

== Academics ==
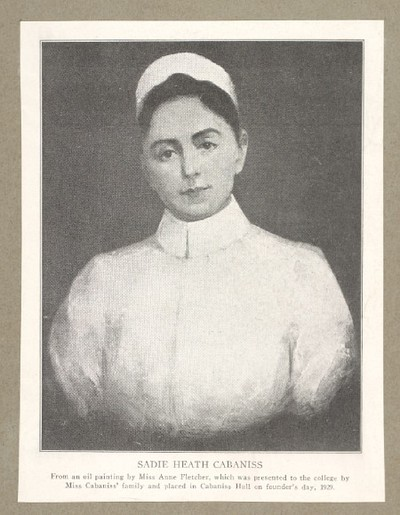
Sadie Heath Cabaniss developed the first training school for nurses that continues to this day at VCU.

=== Schools ===
- Richard T. Robertson School of Communication
- Wilder School of Government and Public Affairs
- College of Health Professions, which includes the Department of Health Administration
- School of the Arts
- School of Business
- School of Dentistry
- School of Education
- College of Engineering
- School of Medicine
- School of Nursing
- School of Pharmacy
- School of Public Health
- VCU School of Social Work
- School of World Studies
- VCU University College
- College of Humanities & Sciences
- VCU Honors College

=== Programs ===
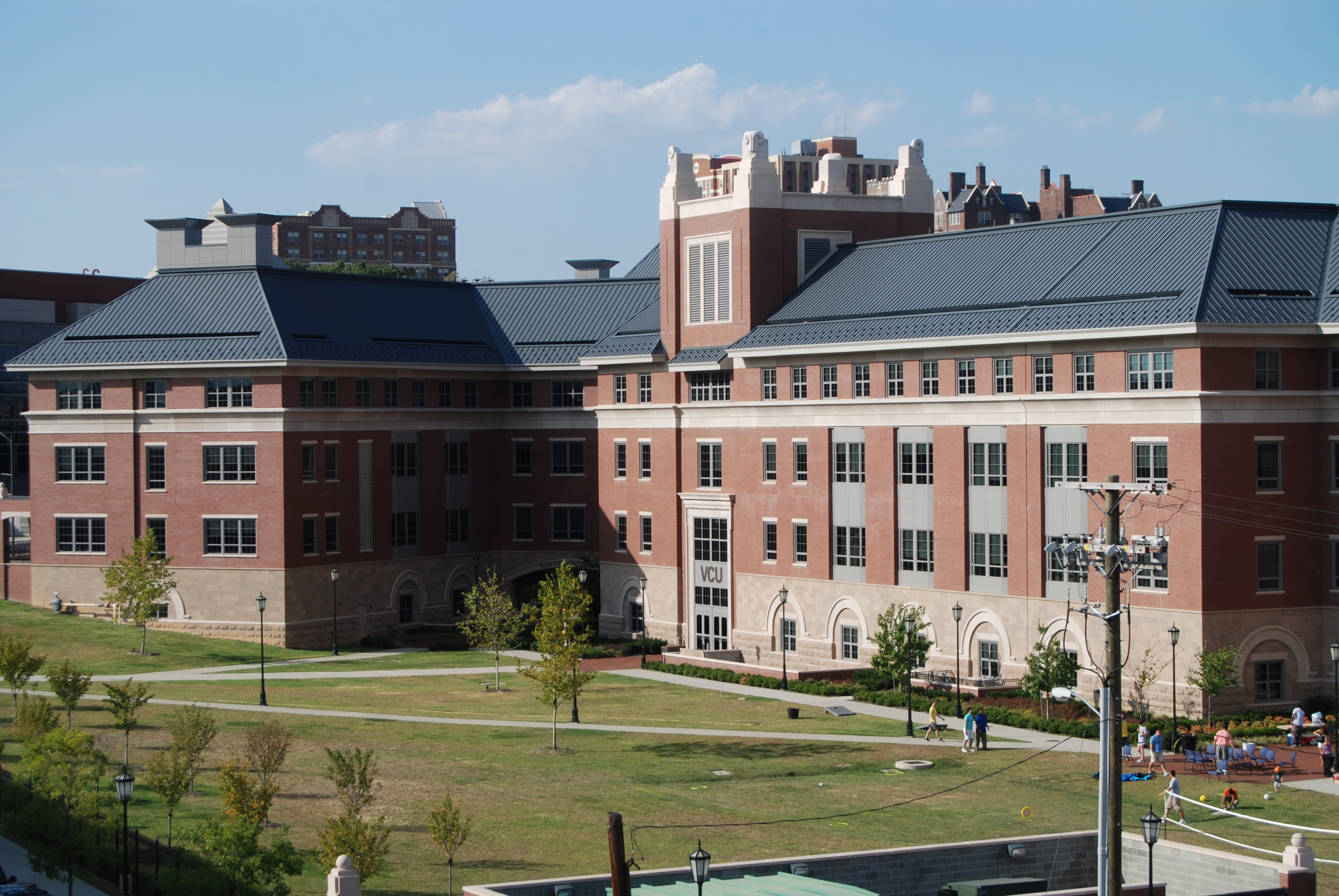
The School of Business' Snead Hall

VCU offers baccalaureate, master's and doctoral degrees, as well as professional and certificate courses.

Seventy-nine of VCU's programs are unique to Virginia, such as the Homeland Security and Emergency Preparedness major in the L. Douglas Wilder School of Government and Public Affairs, as well as the Real Estate and Urban Land Development degree in VCU's School of Business. The university also offers a wide range of study options with 225 certificate, undergraduate, graduate, professional and doctoral degrees in the arts, sciences and humanities.

The university's medical campus provides students with several opportunities for postgraduate study. Under the Guaranteed Admission Program, select incoming undergraduates who maintain a high academic standard are guaranteed a spot in a number of professional health science programs.

==== Life Sciences ====
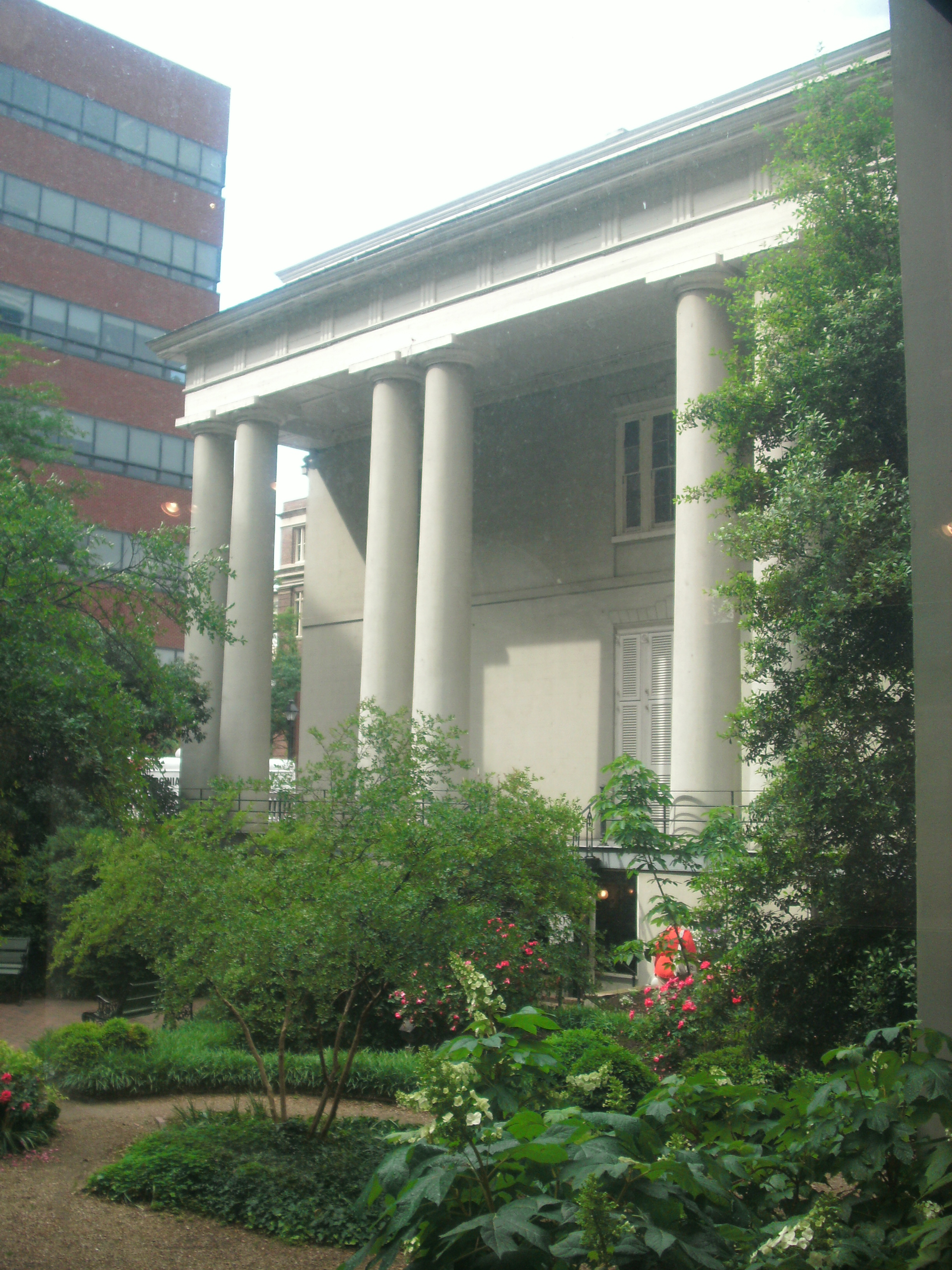
The White House of the Confederacy is located on the VCU Campus

VCU Life Sciences comprises three units: the Center for the Study of Biological Complexity (CSBC), the Center for Environmental Studies (CES), and the Rice Center for Environmental Life Sciences. VCU Life Sciences offers an undergraduate and graduate programs as well as a PhD program in Integrated Life Sciences (ILS). Note that the Department of Biology is a separate unit independent of Life Sciences although there are numerous active interactions between the two. The highly interdisciplinary, systems-based program relies on hundreds of faculty members. With activities at the local, regional and national levels, VCU Life Sciences helps increase public literacy in the life sciences and provides an assessment of American public attitudes toward the field.

==== VCU da Vinci Center ====
VCU schools of the Arts, Business, and Engineering have collaborated to create the VCU da Vinci Center for Innovation in Product Design and Development. Student teams from these schools take on a product development or design challenge posed by one of the center's industry partners. In addition to the current collaboration, the College of Humanities and Sciences joined the Center late in the Fall 2012 semester. The VCU da Vinci Center offers an undergraduate certificate and a master's degree in product innovation. The Masters of Product Innovation is the first of its kind in the United States.

=== Rankings and recognitions ===
Academic rankings

National
- Forbes: 274
- U.S. News & World Report: 136
- Washington Monthly: 63
- WSJ/College Pulse: 217

Global
- ARWU: 201–300
- QS: 901-950
- THE: 401–500
- U.S. News & World Report: 411

In 2025, U.S. News & World Report classified VCU as a Tier 1 University with an overall National University rank of tied for 136th and a rank of tied for 69th among all public colleges and universities in the United States. The university's School of the Arts (VCUarts) was tied for No. 2 in the nation among public university schools of arts and design. The New York Times called it "that rare public research institution that has put the arts front and center". The VCU Brandcenter, the School of Business' graduate program in advertising, has also been ranked first in the nation by Creativity Magazine and as one of the top 60 design schools in the world by BusinessWeek.

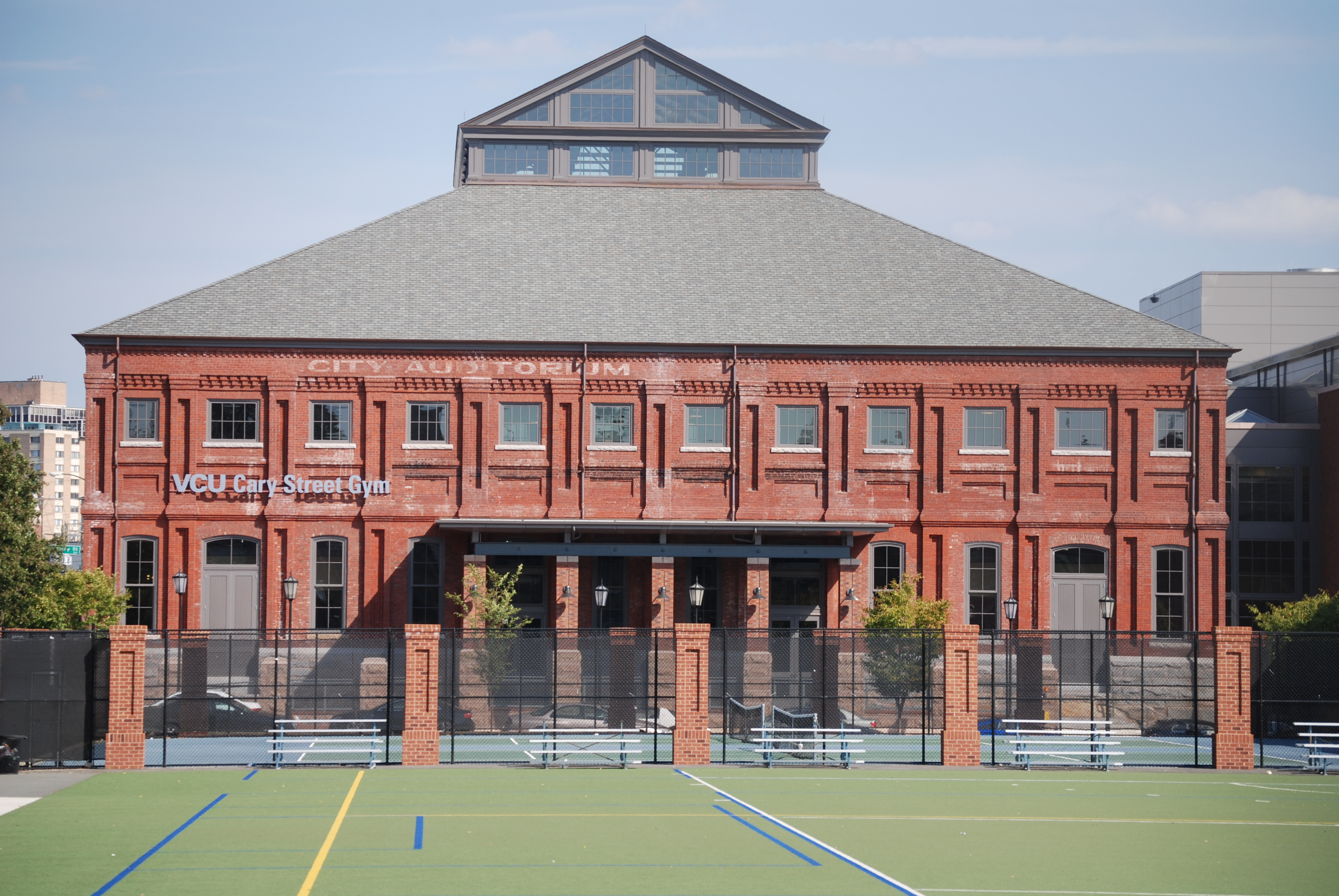
Cary Street Gym

In 2024, Washington Monthly ranked VCU 107th among 438 national universities in the U.S. based on VCU's contribution to the public good, as measured by social mobility, research, and promoting public service.

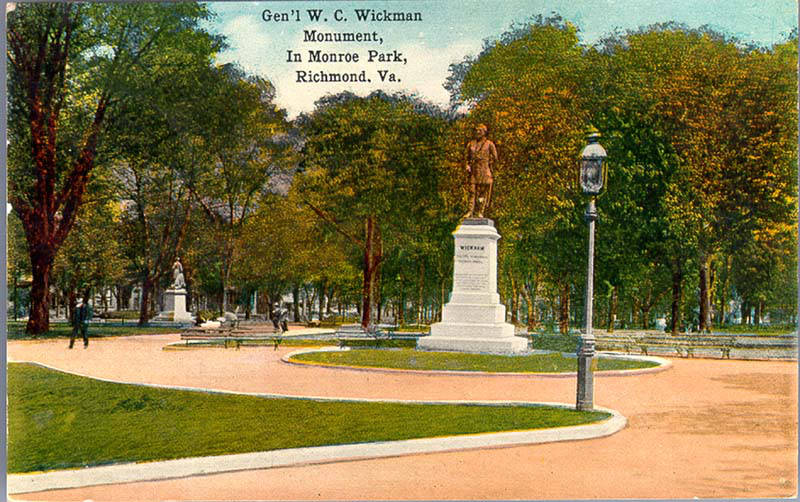
Monroe Park

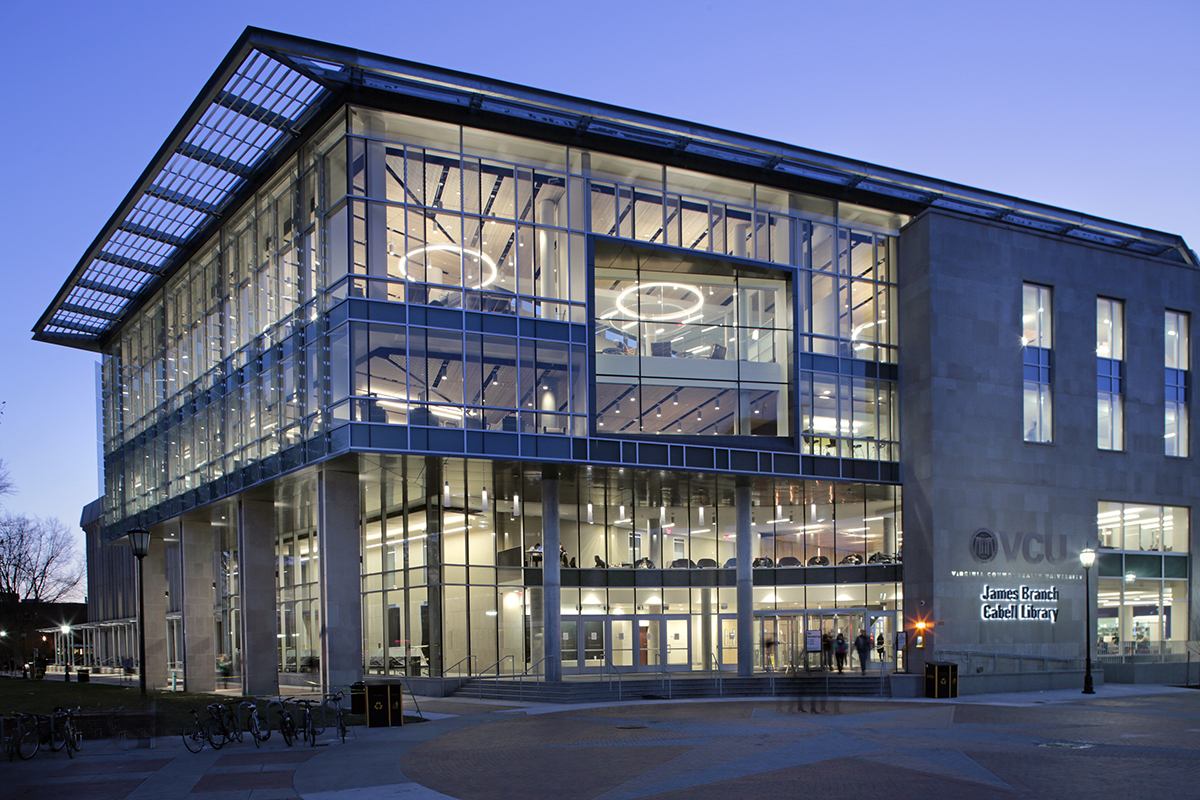
James Branch Cabell Library, Monroe Park Campus.

Five programs of VCU's VCU College of Health Professions rank among the top 50, including three in the top 10, according to U.S. News & World Report's 2025 rankings: rehabilitation counseling programs were No. 3 (tie), healthcare management programs and nurse anesthesia programs ranked No. 8 (tie), occupational therapy programs ranked No. 15 (tie), and VCU's physical therapy programs tied at No. 31.

VCU Engineering, started in 1996 has seen tremendous growth and completely new facilities. As of 2014, U.S. News & Report ranked the Biomedical Engineering program 58th, Computer Engineering program 84th, and Electrical/Electronic/Communications Engineering 89th in the United States.

==== Faculty ====
One faculty member and one alumnus have won a Nobel Prize: Baruj Benacerraf, an alumnus of the Medical College of Virginia, was awarded the 1980 Nobel Prize in Physiology or Medicine, and John Fenn, a professor in the College of Humanities & Sciences, was awarded the 2002 Nobel Prize in Chemistry.

In the medical field, VCU has had four professors elected to the American Academy of Arts and Sciences' Institute of Medicine, most recently Steven Woolf in 2001. Historically, notable faculty members include Charles-Édouard Brown-Séquard, M.D., for whom Brown-Séquard syndrome is named. Hunter McGuire, M.D., was the Confederate surgeon for General Thomas J. "Stonewall" Jackson before he founded the "University College of Medicine", which later merged with Medical College of Virginia where he became the Chairman of Surgery. The Hunter Holmes McGuire Veterans Administration Medical Center is named in his honor.

The theatre department includes costume designer Toni-Leslie James, a two-time Tony Award nominee. The department's chair Sharon Ott received the 1997 Regional Theatre Tony Award on behalf of Berkeley Repertory Theatre; film actor Bostin Christopher is also on the faculty.

=== Libraries ===
The VCU Libraries hold more than 3 million volumes (including more than 665,000 electronic books) and extensive journal and database holdings. The James Branch Cabell Library supports the Monroe Park Campus. Its Special Collections and Archives department houses one of the largest book art collections in the Southeast and the fifth largest graphic novel and comic book collection in the United States, and is the repository of the Will Eisner Comic Industry Awards.

The Health Sciences Library on the MCV Campus has the largest medical collection in the state, with extensive journal collections dating back to the 19th century. Special Collections and Archives maintain the papers of health care practitioners and the history of health care in Virginia. Its Medical Artifacts Collection has more than 6,000 instruments and equipment related to the history of health care in Virginia over the last 150 years.

In March 2016, a 93,000-square-foot expansion of Cabell Library was dedicated. The new space has allowed for the addition of 25 new study rooms, a graduate and faculty reading room, a silent reading room and "The Workshop," a multimedia production suite, a gaming suite, and a makerspace.

=== Magazine ===
Blackbird Journal was founded in 2002 by the Creative Writing Program of the Department of English at Virginia Commonwealth University in partnership with New Virginia Review, Inc., a nonprofit literary arts organization based in Richmond, Virginia. Blackbird published poems by many poets, including: Seyed Morteza Hamidzadeh, Julia B. Levine, Sarah Rose Nordgren, Dave Smith, Sofia Starnes, Inge Pedersen, Wesley Gibson, Andrew Zawacki, Elizabeth King, Kiki Petrosino, Negar Emrani, Kaveh Akbar etc.

== Research ==
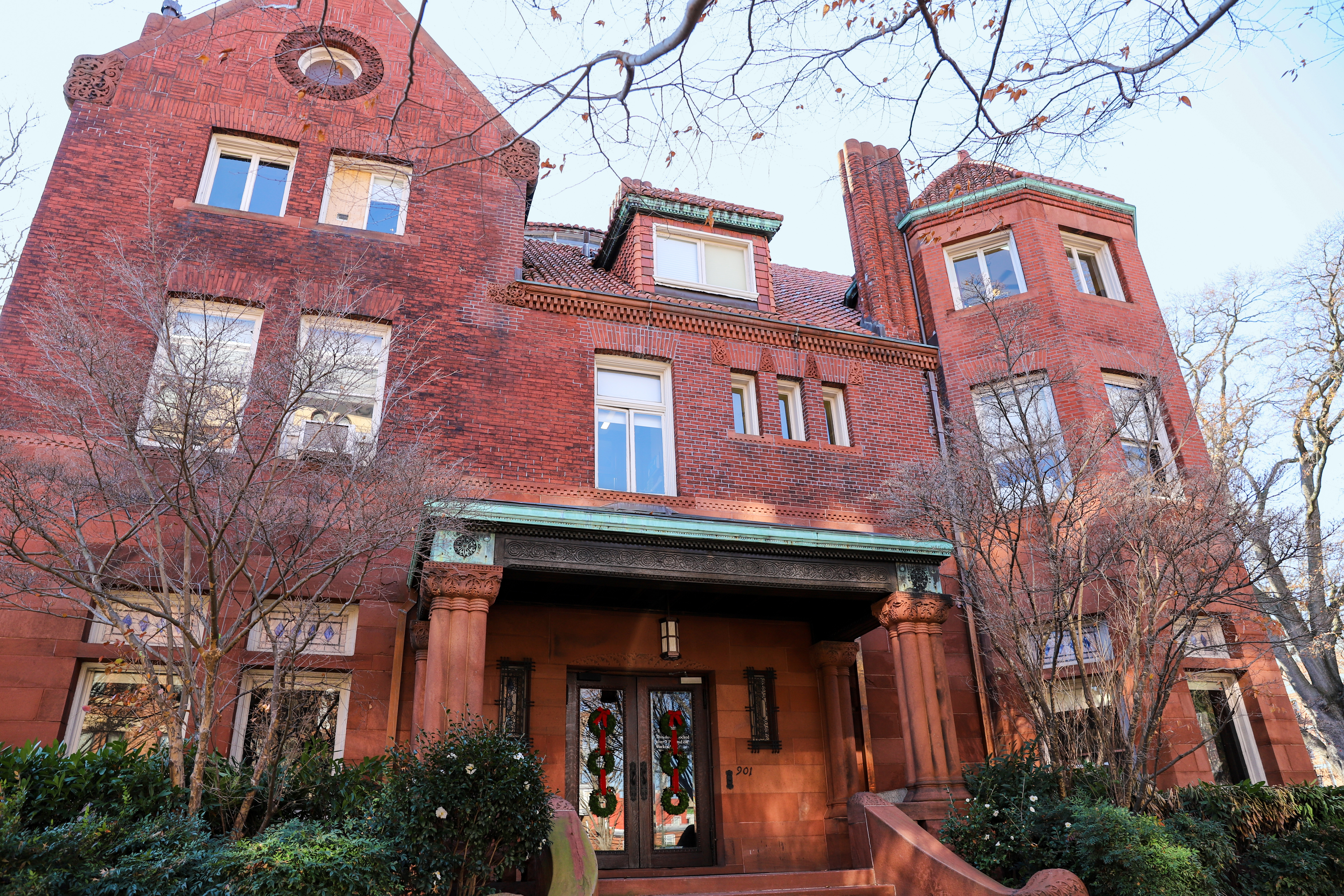
Ginter House, Provost's Office

Virginia Commonwealth University is among the top 3 research universities in Virginia. In fiscal year 2025, VCU received over $560 million in sponsored research, ranking it in the top 50 in the nation according to the National Science Foundation. U.S. News & World Report ranks VCU as in the top 30 of most innovative universities in the nation.

=== Centers and institutes ===
Virginia Commonwealth University has many research centers and institutes including (non-exhaustive):

- Center for the Study of Tobacco Products
- Virginia Center on Aging
- Virginia Institute for Psychiatric and Behavioral Genetics
- Wright Center for Clinical and Translational Research
- Institute for drug and alcohol studies
- da Vinci Center for Innovation
- Rice Rivers Center
- Center for Environmental Studies
- Massey Cancer Center
- Grace E. Harris Leadership Institute
- Humanities Research Center
- Kornblau Institute
- Pauly Heart Center
- Center for Biological Data Science
- Institute for Creative Research
- Center on Society and Health
- Center for Drug Discovery
- Institute for Engineering and Medicine (IEM)
- Philips Institute for Oral Health Research
- Center for Public Policy
- Cybersecurity Center

== Student life ==
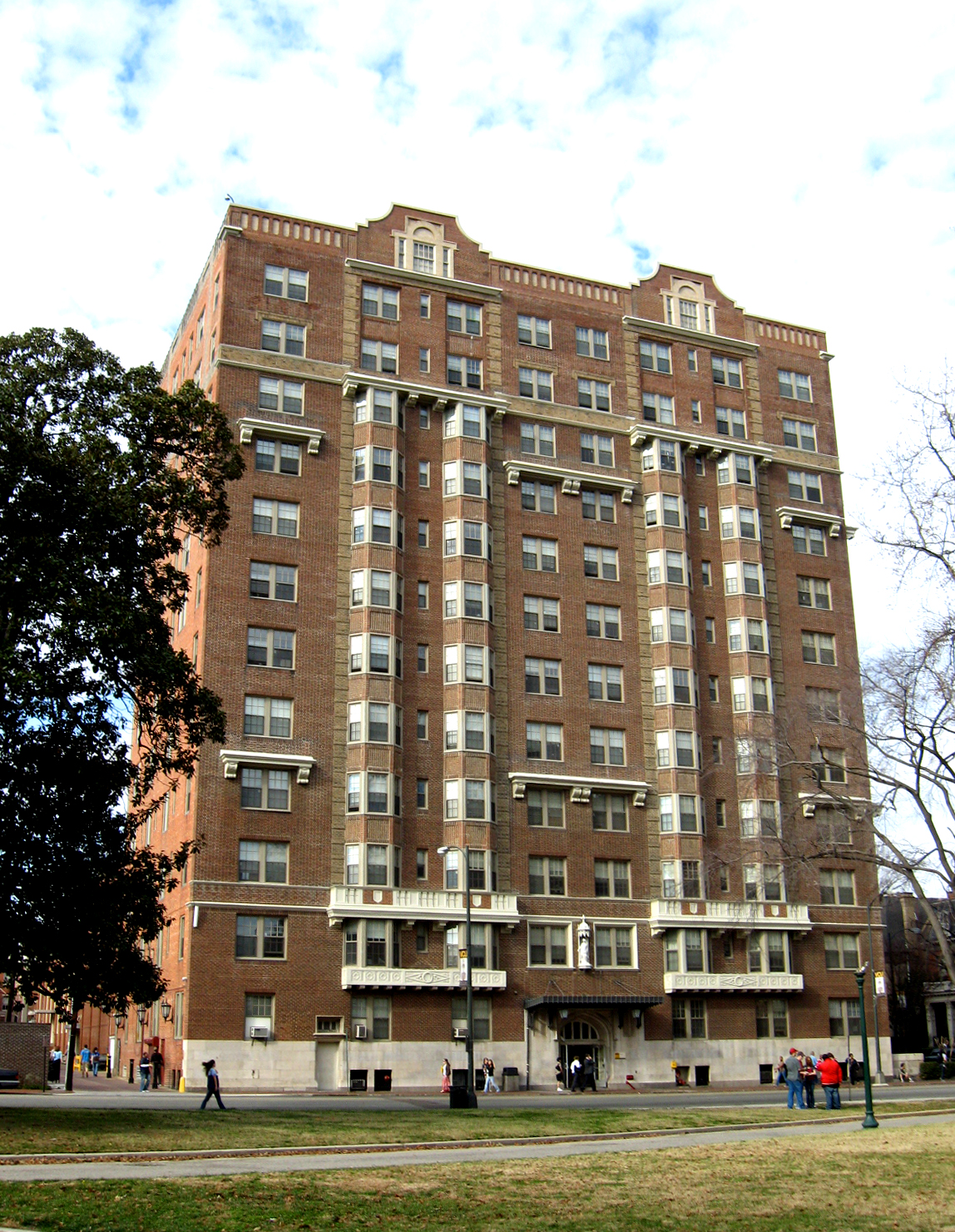
Johnson Hall

Undergraduate demographics as of Fall 2023
Race and ethnicity	Total
White	41%
Black	22%
Asian	14%
Hispanic	12%
Two or more races	8%
International student	2%
Unknown	2%
Economic diversity
Low-income (Note: The percentage of students who received an income-based federal Pell grant intended for low-income students.)	30%
Affluent (Note: The percentage of students who are a part of the American middle class at the bare minimum.)	70%

=== Residential life ===
More than 79% of VCU freshmen live on campus. VCU's current residential hall capacity is around 6,200 students. Because of the prominent location within the city of Richmond, many upperclassmen live in student apartments located around the campus, specifically in The Fan, Oregon Hill or the Carver neighborhood, and are still able to walk or bike to their classes.

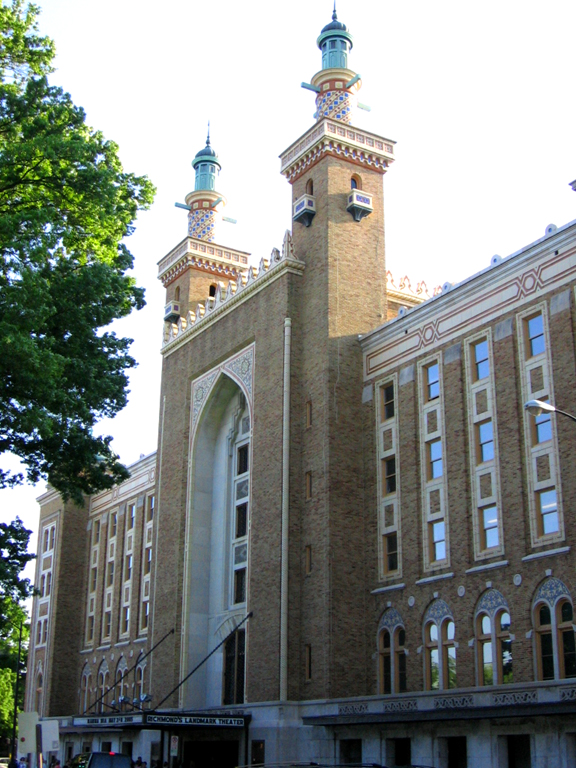
Altria Theater, also known as the Mosque.

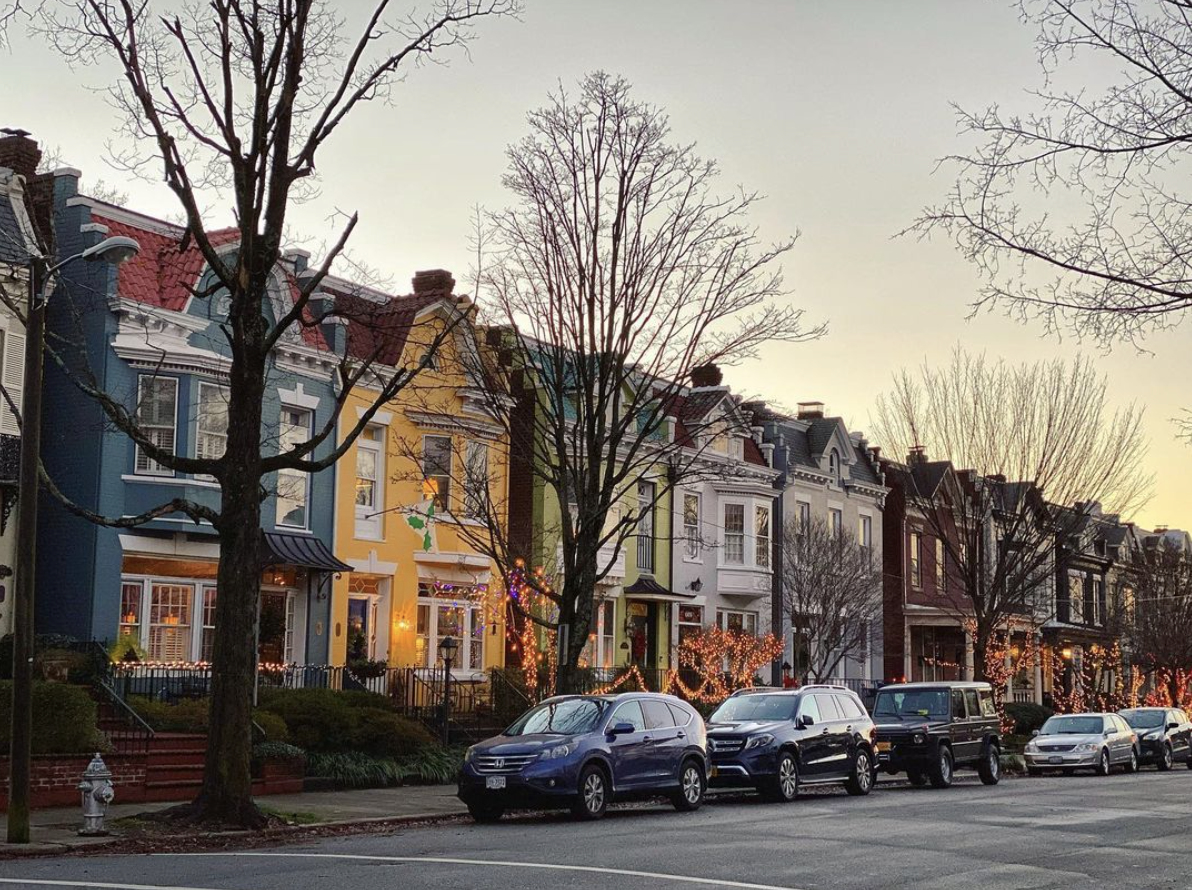
Fan District

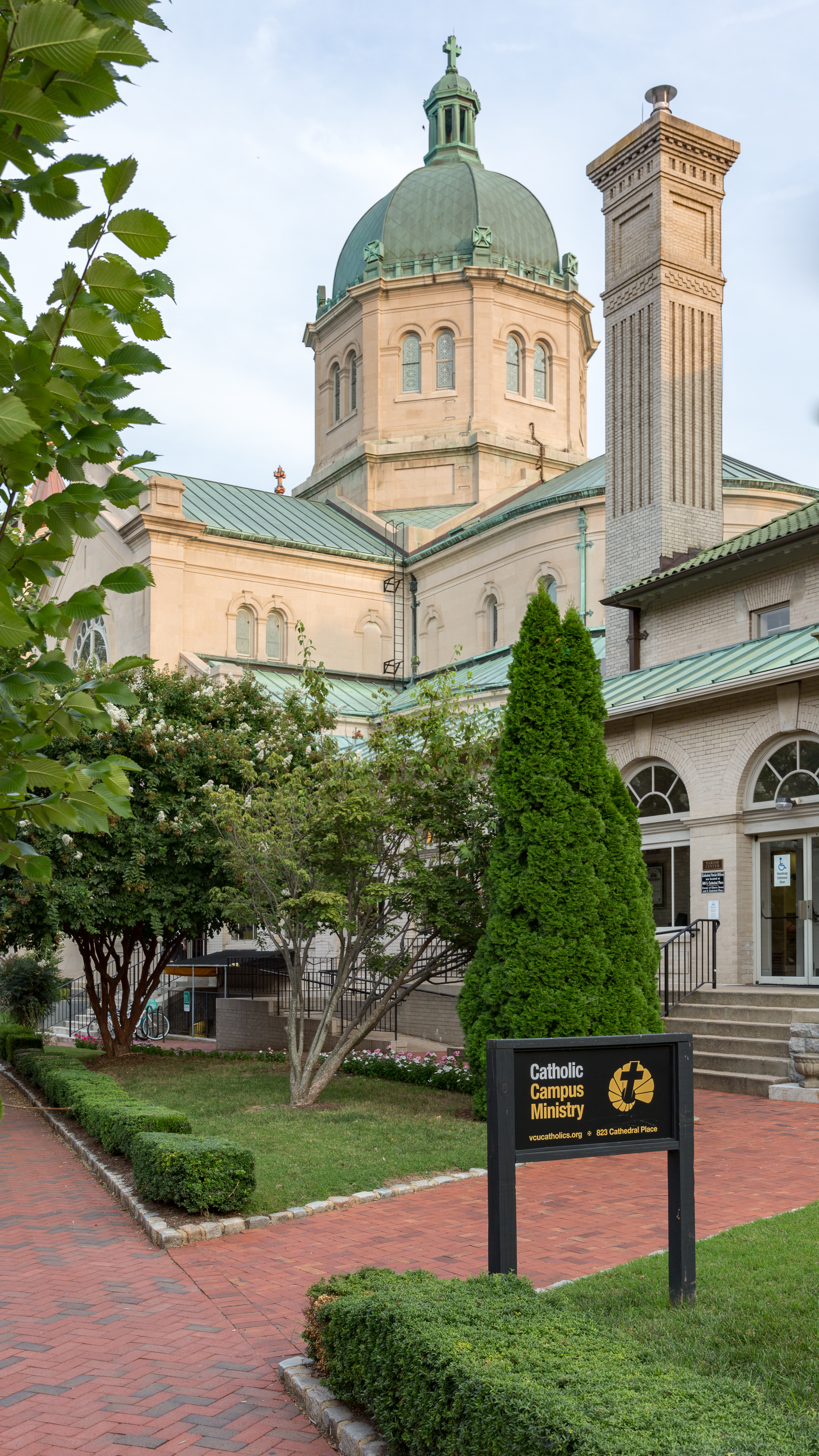
Cathedral of the Sacred Heart Campus Ministry

=== Dining ===
Dining Services at VCU is contracted to ARAMARK Higher Education. Undergraduate students living in a dorm-style university residence hall are required to purchase a residential dining plan.

=== Activities ===
==== Student organizations ====
VCU has more than 500 registered student organizations in which students can be involved. VCU boasts a well-established net of ethnic and cultural, religious, recreational and special interest organizations. There are two student government associations at VCU, one for each campus.

VCU was an academic partner to the largest French Film Festival in the United States. Founded in 1993, the total participation in 2012 had grown to more than 22,000 entries for the 27 films.

==== Student media ====
VCU offers many student-run media outlets that allow students to express themselves:

- Amendment – An annual literary journal that presents points of view outside mainstream culture, specializing in social progression through artistic expression.
- Annum Arcanum – An annual literary journal focused on genre fiction.
- The Commonwealth Times – An independent student-run and -written newspaper published weekly online and in print during the school year.
- Emanata – A student-run comics anthology published every spring.
- Ink Magazine – Multi-ethnic student news magazine published two times during the academic year, and publishes online year round.
- Pwatem (formerly spelled Poictesme) – An undergraduate student literary journal distributed every spring to the student body and surrounding community. Also publishes a fall chapbook, Rabble.
- River City Fashion – A student-run fashion blog with a companion lookbook.
- WVCW – A student-run independent online radio station at VCU.
- Former, now inactive student media orgs include Potboiler Podcast Network, Rams Review, Mesh Media, and The Horn.

===== Altria Theater (Mosque) =====
A large contributor to VCU, Altria Group purchased the theater located centrally on campus. Formerly known as The Mosque and the Landmark Theater, the Altria Theater was originally built for Shriners of the Acca Temple Shrine. In 1940, the building was purchased by the City of Richmond, which converted much of its interior for municipal use. The Richmond Police Department occupied the theater's basement, where they opened up office space, classrooms, a gymnasium, and a shooting range for the police academy. An underground swimming pool was maintained, initially for training purposes, until it was filled in with concrete during the 2014 renovation. Many are familiar with the basement of the Mosque as the location for VCU class registration, which occurred several times each year.

The theater was designed in Moorish Revival style by Marcellus E. Wright Sr. in association with Charles M. Robinson and Charles Custer Robinson circa 1925. J. R. Ray, of the Richmond Tile and Mosaic Works, was responsible for the widely used ornamental tile, and J. Frank Jones, of the Rambusch Decorating Company, oversaw the interior decoration. The building officially opened in 1927, and was dedicated by the Shriners in 1928.

Performers such as Elvis Presley, Jimi Hendrix, Bill Burr, Grateful Dead, Bruce Springsteen, Frank Sinatra, Roy Buchanan, B. B. King, Widespread Panic and The Supremes held shows at this venue. Notable Broadway performances such as Wicked, The Lion King, Les Miserables, and Cats have been past visitors of The Altria Theater.

==== Recreational sports ====
Recreational Sports offers facilities on both campuses. Opened in spring 2010, the newly renovated Cary Street Gym includes the 18,000-square-foot fitness center, a rock climbing wall, two pools, racquetball and basketball courts, a track and an aerobics mezzanine.

The MCV Campus Recreation and Aquatic Center provide space for basketball, volleyball, racquetball and other sports. A 25-meter, six-lane pool is available for lap swimming, water basketball and volleyball.

The VCU Outdoor Adventure Program provides a full schedule of day trips and weekend excursions focused on such outdoor activities as camping, kayaking, white-water rafting, canoeing and caving.

==== Service learning ====
Service learning at VCU is a course-based, credit-bearing educational experience in which students participate in an organized service activity that meets community-identified needs. More than 3,000 VCU students are enrolled in service learning at VCU.

==== Greek system ====
Virginia Commonwealth University hosts 36 international fraternities and sororities across four governing councils with over 1,700 students. Within the student body, a total of 6.3% of women join a sorority and 8% of men join a fraternity. VCU's fraternity and sorority community has grown particularly rapidly in the last few years. .

The four governing councils of VCU's Greek system are the Interfraternity Council (IFC), the College Panhellenic Council (CPC), the National Pan-Hellenic Council (NPHC), and the Unified Greek Council (UGC). The UGC was originally established as the Multicultural Greek Council (MGC) respectively. The first organizations to be founded within each respective governing council on campus were Sigma Phi Epsilon (for IFC), Alpha Sigma Alpha (for CPC), Delta Sigma Theta (for NPHC), and Lambda Upsilon Lambda (for UGC).

=== Security ===
VCU's police force consists of 99 sworn police officers and more than 200 security personnel. VCU also provides a free Security Escort service (RAM SAFE) to students and faculty to assist them in reaching their destination and have stationed more than 370 Emergency Reporting Telephone Systems in various areas throughout campus.

== Athletics ==
VCU Rams athletic logo

Having competed at the NCAA Division I level for little more than 30 years, Virginia Commonwealth University has sponsored a broad-based program of intercollegiate athletics. The VCU Rams have won in excess of 30 conference championships, participated in numerous NCAA post-season championship events, including a run to the Final Four in men's basketball in 2011, and had a number of All-Americans—both academic and athletic. VCU currently sponsors sixteen varsity teams in NCAA Division I play through the Atlantic 10 Conference (A10).

VCU men's tennis is one of the school's most successful programs. The team is coached by Paul Kostin who is one of five Division I coaches to reach the 900-victory mark. The men's tennis team holds 12 CAA Championships, 18 NCAA tournament appearances, and 17 years of finishing in the top 25 rankings in the country. In 2000, VCU men's tennis had its best season, finishing runner up to Stanford in the NCAA Finals Championship match. The team finished with a No. 9 ranking in the country. Also under coach Paul Kostin, VCU's women's tennis team has 3 CAA championships, 12 NCAA appearances, and 8 years in the top 25.

VCU baseball has won a total of 3 CAA Championships and has been to a total of 8 NCAA regionals. The team plays its games at The Diamond (Richmond, Virginia).

Other intercollegiate sports include men and women's basketball, men and women's cross country, field hockey, golf, men and women's soccer (played at Sports Backers Stadium), men and women's track and field, volleyball, and women's lacrosse.

VCU also has many student-run club teams. These sports not sponsored by the university include coed & all-girl cheerleading, baseball, softball, men's and women's rugby union, ultimate, men's and women's lacrosse, cycling, men's and women's crew, and dodgeball. Previous club sports include ice hockey, wrestling, and tennis.

=== Men’s basketball ===
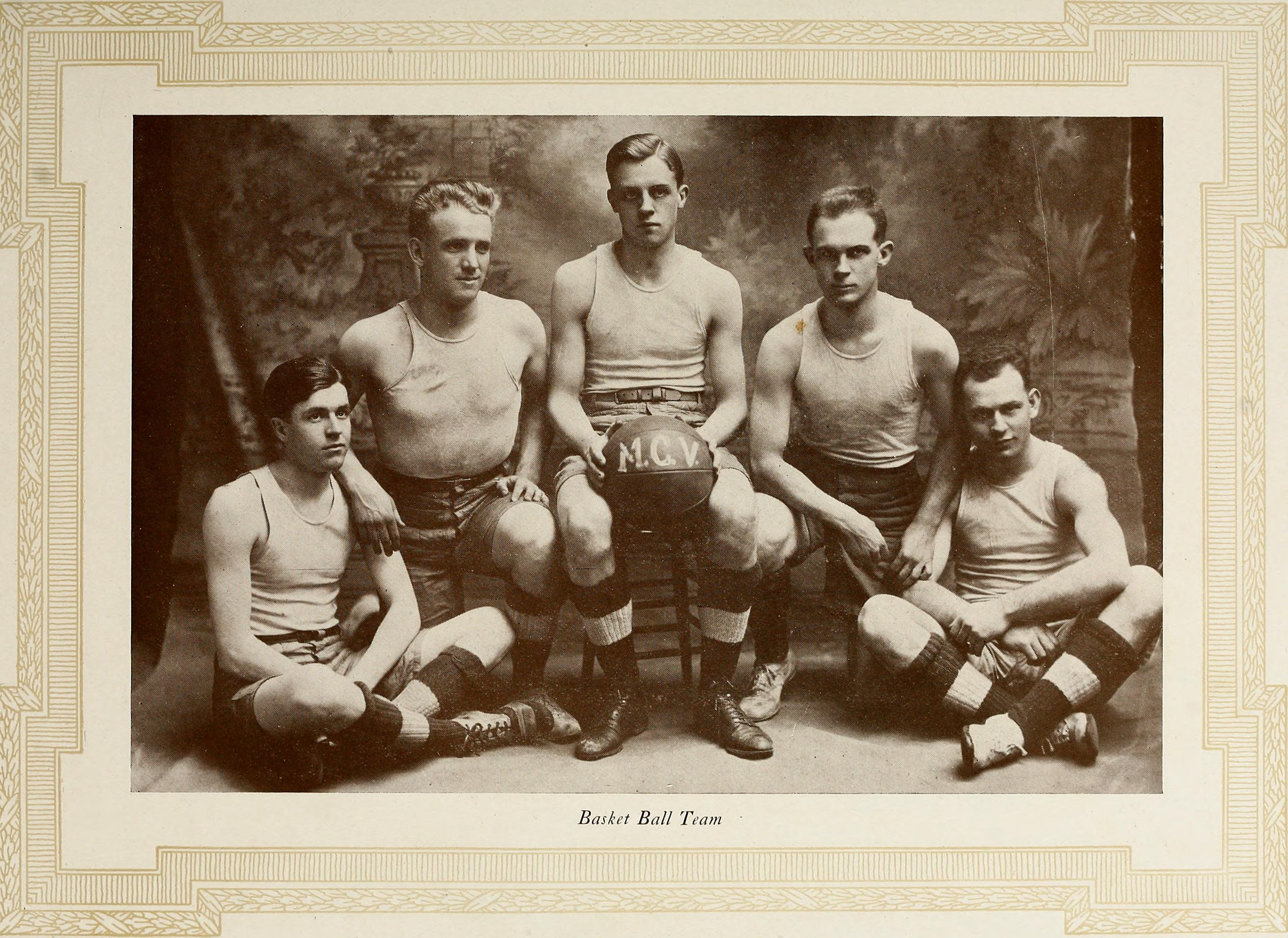
Basketball team, 1914

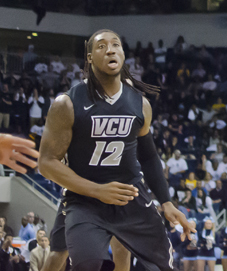
Mo Alie-Cox

VCU reached the Final Four in the 2011 NCAA tournament. The team has won a total of 9 conference championships with the most recent coming in 2015, the team's first A10 championship win. The VCU Rams currently play at the Stuart C. Siegel Center, where they hold the 11th highest Home Court winning percentage in Division I basketball with a winning percentage of .8579

In the 2011 NCAA Men's Division I Basketball Tournament, VCU qualified as an at-large bid, having to play in the newly formatted tournament's "First Four" against USC. The decision to allow VCU to participate in the tournament was widely criticized among pundits and the media. VCU defeated USC 59–46 in the "First Four" play-in game. VCU then went on to upset Georgetown 74–56 in the round of 64. The 11th-seeded VCU Rams then upset third-seeded Purdue 94–76 to advance to the Sweet 16 for the first time in school history. In the sweet sixteen, VCU defeated tenth-seeded Florida State 72–71 on a last second bucket in overtime to advance to the Elite 8 for the first time in school history. VCU beat the No. 1 seed Kansas in the Southwest Regional final by a score of 71–61. It was the Rams' first trip to the Final Four. Against Butler in the Final Four, VCU lost 70–62. The 2010–11 VCU Rams men's basketball team finished sixth in the ESPN/USA Today Coaches Poll at the end of the season. This was the highest ranking in VCU's history and the highest ranking of any team from the CAA.

=== Women's basketball ===
The VCU Rams Women's team had its most successful season in 2008–2009. Led by future WNBA Draft Pick Quanitra Hollingsworth, that team finished the season with a mark of 26–7 overall and a 15–3 conference record. Notably the team was a perfect 16–0 at home. After finishing second in the Colonial Athletic Association the team headed to their first ever NCAA tournament game as a 10 seed, where the No. 7 seeded Rutgers eliminated them 57–51 at the RAC in Piscataway, N.J. The 2009–10 squad also reached the Sweet 16 of the WNIT.

=== Athletics rivals ===
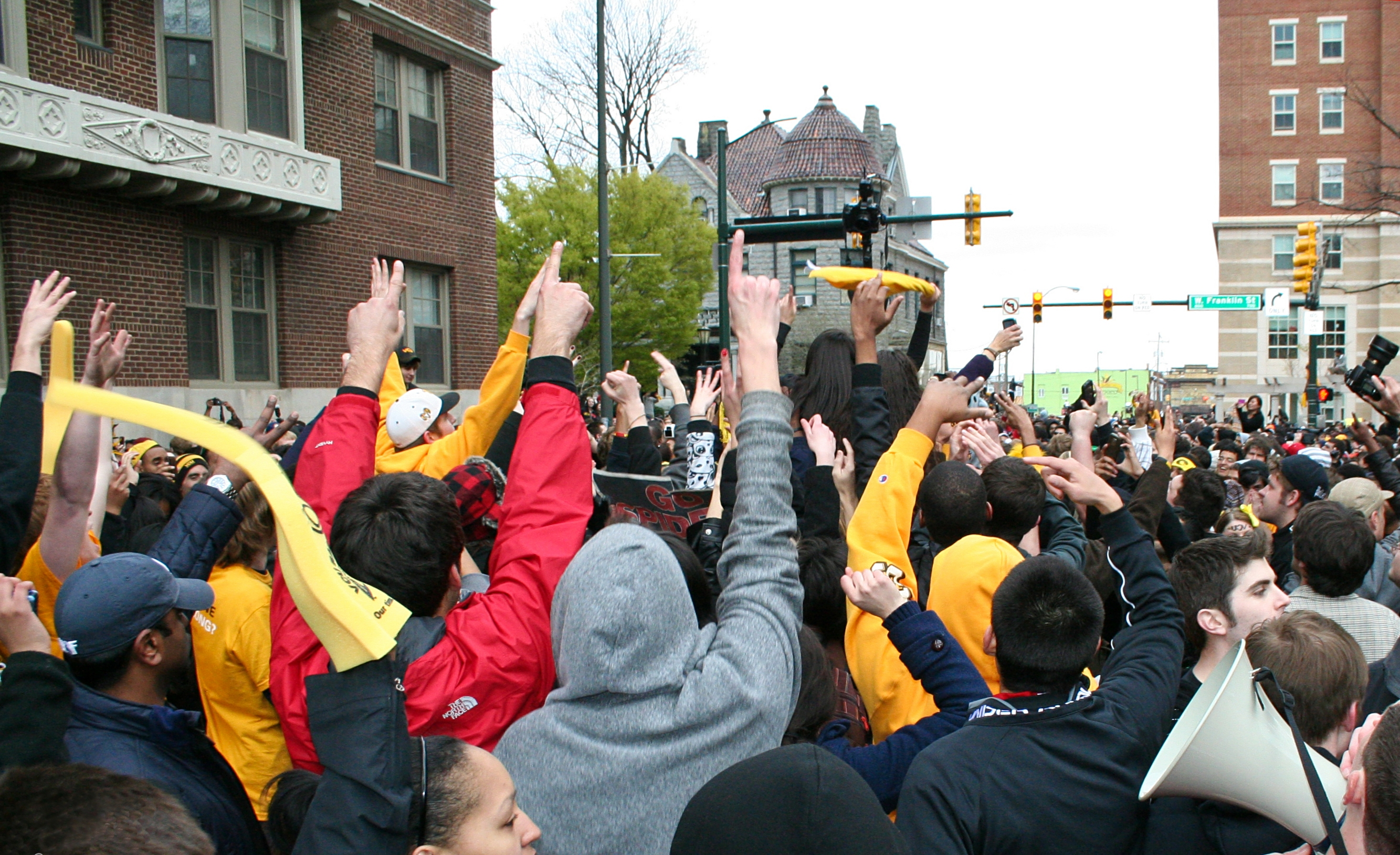
Students celebrate VCU's upset victory over Kansas. The win gave VCU a berth into the Final Four.

VCU's main rival is Old Dominion University. The Old Dominion–VCU men's basketball rivalry is often regarded as the best college basketball rivalry in the Commonwealth of Virginia. The Rams' have an intracity rivalry with the University of Richmond, the Black & Blue Classic.

=== Rowdy Rams ===
The Rowdy Rams is a student-run athletic support organization that focuses on VCU men's basketball, while also attending and supporting the university's 16 other varsity teams. The group began during the 2002–2003 basketball season when a group of VCU Pep Band members and other students began coordinating cheers together and taking road trips to away games. The following year, the Rowdy Rams procured funding from the SGA and sponsorship from VCU's Athletic Department, solidifying themselves as an official organization. In May 2013, The Rowdy Rams won the annual Naismith Student Section of the Year award, which awards the most passionate student section in college basketball.

== Notable alumni ==
VCU alumni include: Patch Adams is a medical doctor, author, activist, and clown; Christopher Poole is an internet entrepreneur and founder of 4chan, which revolutionized internet communication; David Baldacci is a best-selling author and speaker; William Gifford is the CEO for Altria, the largest producer of tobacco products in the United States and partial owners of Juul. VCU alumni include artists and musicians, including Lamb of God, Gwar, Sam Beam and Will Toledo.

== See also ==
- Institute for Contemporary Art, Richmond
- VCU Center for Rehabilitation Science and Engineering
