= VCU Department of Health Administration =

Unit of Virginia Commonwealth University

The Department of Health Administration at Virginia Commonwealth University is rich with history. Education in health administration at Virginia Commonwealth University (VCU) began in 1949 with the establishment of a graduate curriculum in hospital administration.

The department now includes three major programs:

- Master of Health Administration
- Professional Master of Science in Health Administration – Online
- Doctor of Philosophy in Health Services Organization and Research.

The department also cooperates with the schools of law at the University of Richmond and Washington and Lee University in offering dual degree programs in health administration and law. In 2001, the dual degree MD/MHA program was established with the VCU School of Medicine. Both master's programs are fully accredited by the Commission on Accreditation of Healthcare Management Education (CAHME) and are consistently ranked in the top tier of health administration programs.

The Department of Health Administration also has a major research program and is involved in a wide range of public service activities, including continuing studies for health services administrators and other health professionals.

== History ==
Education in health administration at the university began in 1949 with the establishment of a graduate curriculum in hospital administration. Early graduates received a certificate; the master's degree was awarded beginning in 1955.

These early efforts grew and developed into the Department of Health Administration, which was established in 1972.

== Alumni ==
- Richard Bracken, CEO of Hospital Corporation of America
- Marilyn Tavenner, acting administrator for Centers for Medicare and Medicaid Services
