= The Commonwealth Times =

Student newspaper in Virginia, US

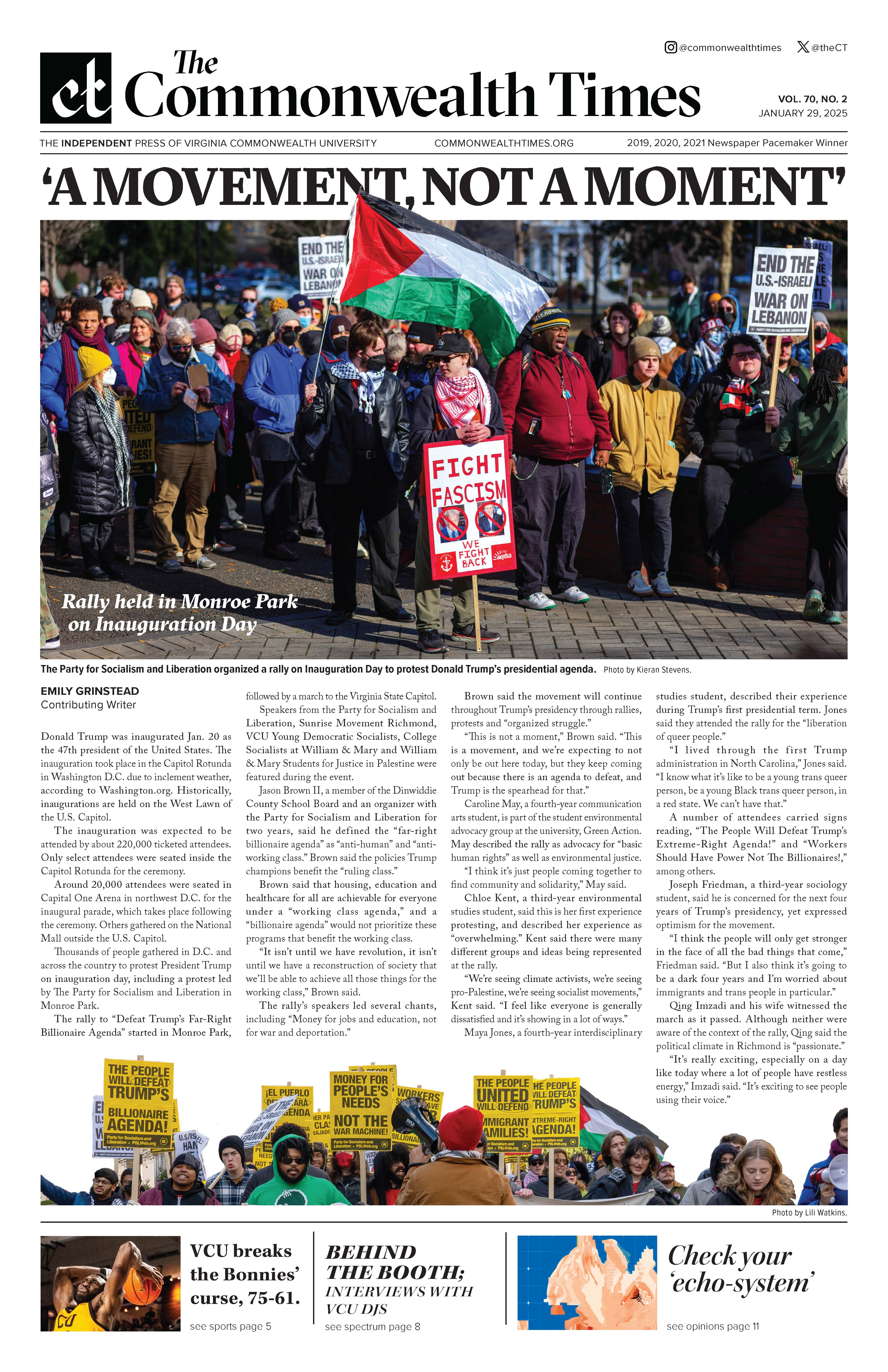
- Type: Student newspaper
- Format: Tabloid
- Owner: Virginia Commonwealth University
- Staff writers: ~150
- Founded: 1969
- Headquarters: Student Media Center – Richmond, Virginia
- Circulation: 3,000 every other week
- Website: commonwealthtimes.org

The Commonwealth Times is the weekly independent student newspaper for Virginia Commonwealth University in Richmond, Virginia. Almost all of the published Commonwealth Times papers from 1969 to present day can be found on the VCU libraries website within the Digital Collections.

== History ==
The CT, as it is known, was founded in September 1969, and became independent from the School of Mass Communications the next year. During its first decade, it had its headquarters in a historic house on West Franklin Street and ran ads for products including Budweiser beer.

The CT switched from broadsheet to tabloid in 1976, and later increased its frequency from twice a week to three times a week. Early in the spring 1998 semester, it switched back to twice weekly (Monday and Thursday).

The offices moved in 1988 to what was then the brand-new General Purpose Academic Building at 901 W. Main St. It was renamed the T. Edward Temple Building in 1998.

The paper's payroll and office supplies come from its advertising revenue, while student activity fees pay for printing. In the mid-2000s, the CT's computers were finally updated and the paper became fully paginated and started using color photographs. Prior to that, staff members had used outdated Macintosh computers, most of which had been acquired in the early 1990s, and still pasted up pages and sized pictures manually.

Also during this time, the CT was known for The Picks, a weekly feature during the football season, usually on the back page. It included mugshots of staff members, along with their picks for upcoming NFL games and their records so far in the season. Below that was a narrative, normally written by the sports editor, that commented on the staff members' progress in The Picks and used double entendres and plain-old raunch to describe them and their personalities. The Picks drew the fire of university administration for years, and was eventually eliminated in the early 2000s.

From 2005-2024, the CT was based in VCU's Student Media Center at 817 W. Broad St.; in 2024, the Student Media Center moved to new space in the Cary and Belvidere Residential College building on Cary St. In 2008, the paper received a national first-place award from the Society of Professional Journalists for its breaking-news coverage of the massacre at Virginia Tech as well as a number of awards from the Virginia Press Association. In 2019, 2020, 2021 and 2025, the paper earned the national Associated Collegiate Press Pacemaker award for college newspapers.

As of fall 2025, the CT prints a full-color broadsheet newspaper every week, complemented by daily updates to the Commonwealthtimes.org website.
