= VCU School of Medicine =

Medical school of Virginia Commonwealth University

Virginia Commonwealth University School of Medicine
- Motto: In the tradition of the Medical College of Virginia
- Type: Public medical school
- Established: 1838; 188 years ago
- Parent institution: Virginia Commonwealth University
- Dean: Arturo P. Saavedra
- Faculty: 1,175 full time faculty
- Students: 759 - M.D. 165 - Masters; 281 - Ph. D. 123 - Certificate
- Location: Richmond, Virginia, U.S. 37.540341°N 77.429152°W
- Campus: MCV Campus
- Website: medschool.vcu.edu

The Virginia Commonwealth University School of Medicine is the medical school of Virginia Commonwealth University, a public research university in Richmond, Virginia, United States. It is the largest and second oldest medical school in Virginia. The school traces its beginnings to the 1838 opening of the medical department of Hampden–Sydney College, which in 1854 became an independent institution known as the Medical College of Virginia (MCV). In 1968, MCV joined with the Richmond Professional Institute to form Virginia Commonwealth University. The School of Medicine is one of six schools on VCU's MCV Campus, which includes the VCU Medical Center and Children's Hospital of Richmond at VCU.

Located on VCU's MCV Campus in Richmond, the medical school offers dozens of master's, doctoral, and interdisciplinary programs in addition to the M.D. degree, postdoctoral research, and residency training opportunities. The Virginia BioTechnology Research Park in Richmond gives faculty and students an incubator to grow bioscience companies and research programs.

With more than 300 basic science investigators, the School of Medicine accounts for more than half of VCU's sponsored research awards and more than 85 percent of the university's National Institutes of Health funding.

The medical school provides educational expertise and clinical services to the patients of the VCU Medical Center. The medical center offers comprehensive contemporary medical services, including the region's Level 1 Trauma Center, a Level 3 Neonatal Intensive-Care Unit, a translational research center, a comprehensive organ transplantation center, a research and rehabilitation center, a children's mental health facility, a burn care center, with a teaching hospital with 779 beds and 650 physicians. Virginia Commonwealth University Medical Center is one of 35 designated Ebola centers. VCU faculty staff the Hunter Holmes McGuire VA Medical Center and VCU faculty serve as national Veterans Administration directors for rehabilitation medicine, radiation oncology, primary care, and residency education.

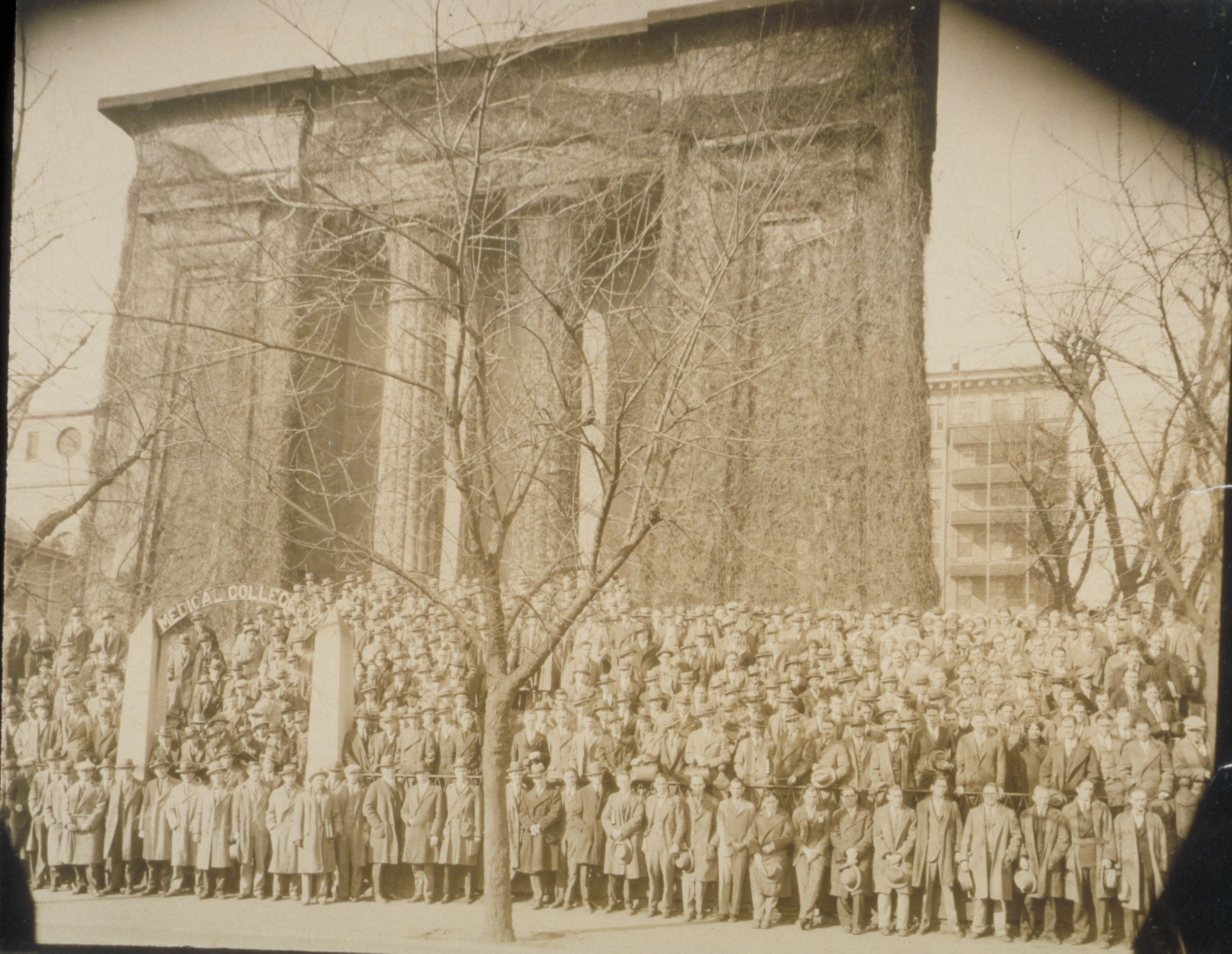
MCV Students in front of the Egyptian Building

== Education ==
Educational programs include medical undergraduate, graduate, masters and PhD pathways. Additionally, a Premedical Graduate Certificate Program delivers a one-year, intensive graduate-level program for students to enhance their qualifications for admission into professional school, including medical, dental and veterinary school.

== Facilities ==
Critical Care Hospital

The Critical Care Hospital, a $184 million 15-level, 367,000-square-foot (34,100 m^{2}) facility with 232 adult patient beds, opened in October 2008.

The James W. and Frances G. McGlothlin Medical Education Center

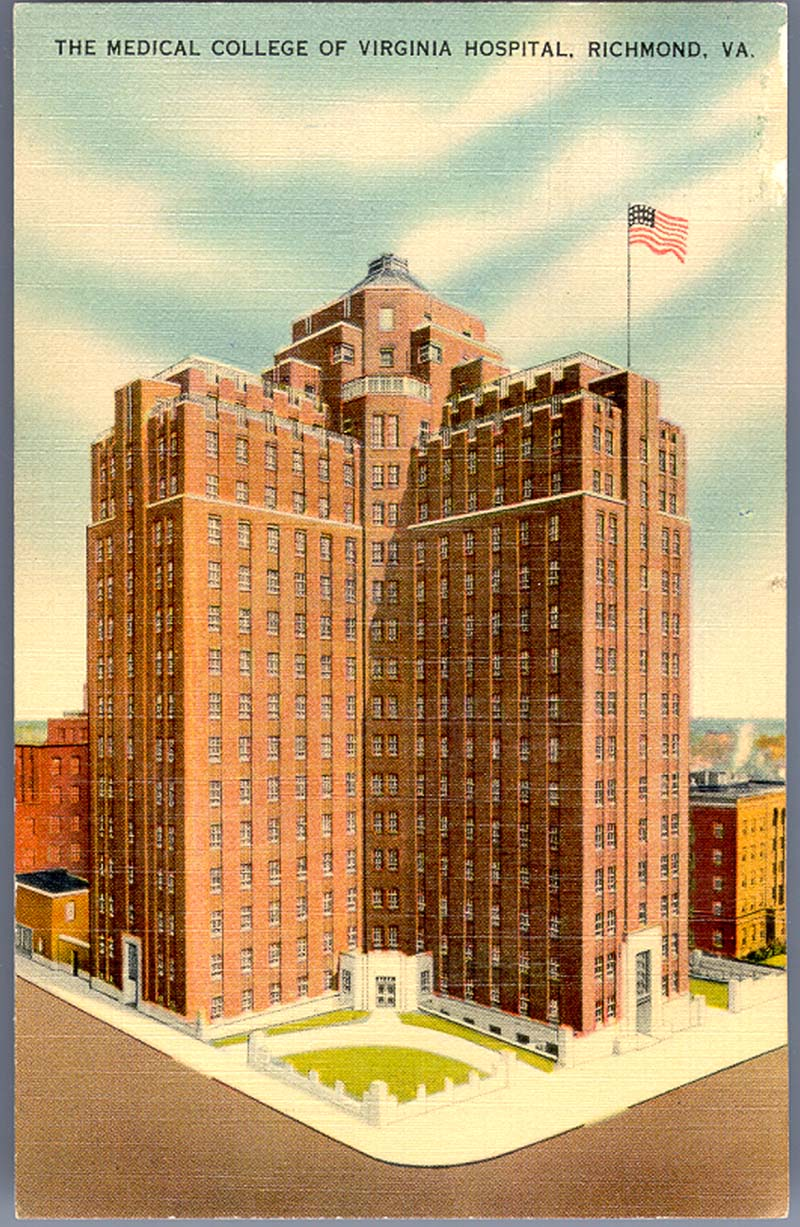
West Hospital

The $158.6 million, James W. and Frances G. McGlothlin Medical Education Center was built through a public-private partnership, with $70 million provided by funds from the Commonwealth of Virginia. VCU and private funds supported the remaining cost. The building is named for James and Frances McGlothlin who donated $25 million to the project on April 11, 2011. The facility was completed in spring 2013.

Molecular Medicine Research Building

The eight-story, 125,000-square-foot (11,600 m^{2}) Molecular Medicine Research Building was completed in 2009 and houses 48 principal investigators and their staffs. The research facility includes a 75-seat auditorium with teleconference facilities, a multipurpose seminar space and state-of-the-art research labs.

Sanger Hall

Opened in 1968, Sanger Hall is a 12-story structure named for Dr. William T. Sanger, the third President of MCV. Sanger houses the School of Medicine's administrative offices, a number of departmental offices and wet labs, as well classrooms and large lecture halls.

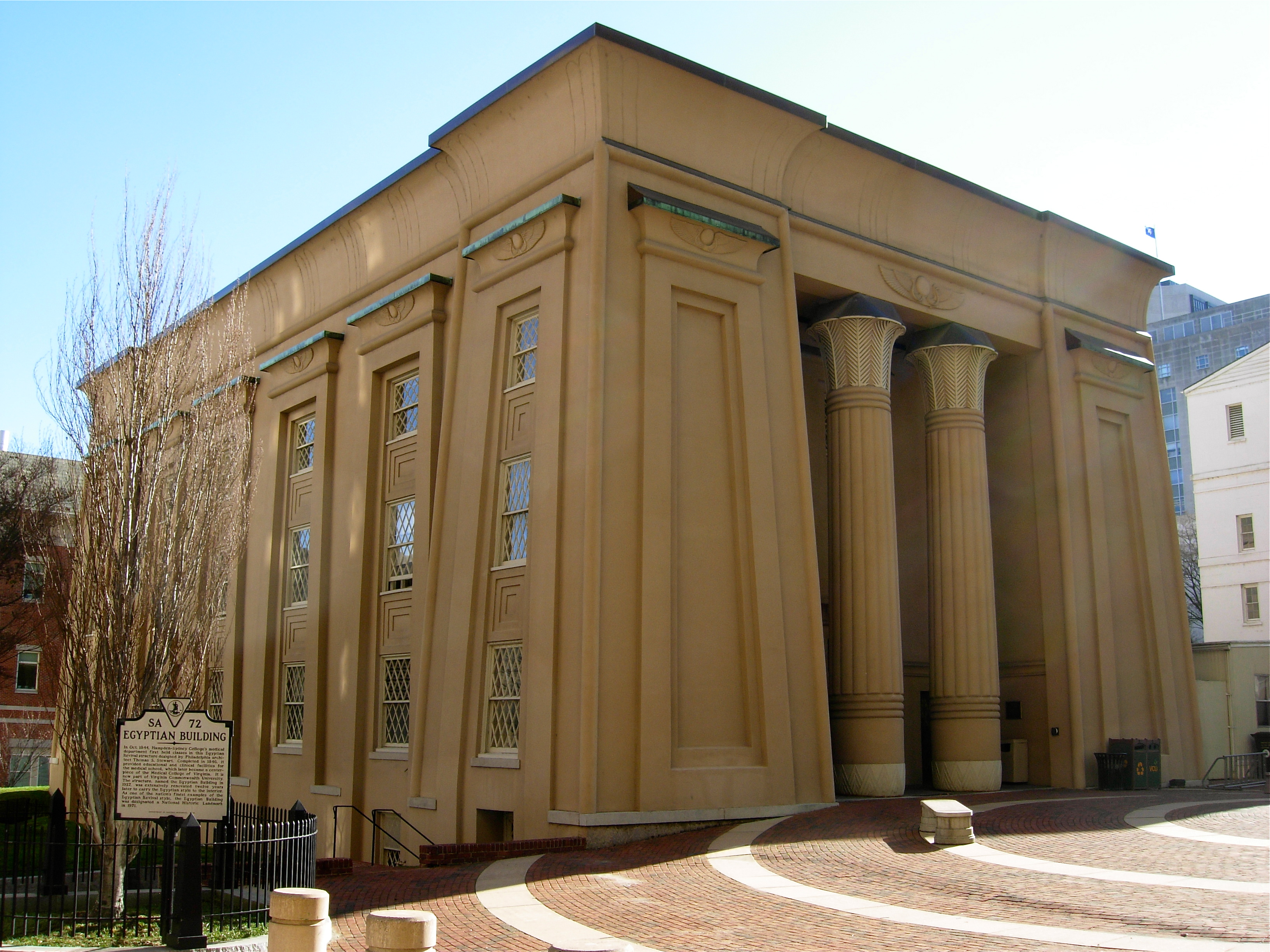
Egyptian Building

West Hospital West Hospital is an art deco inspired structure that opened as a clinical care facility in 1941. The 18 story structure houses both School of Medicine and School of Allied Health Professions units.

Egyptian Building

The Egyptian Building, a National Historic Landmark, is an Egyptian Revival style building completed in 1845. It was the first permanent home of the Medical Department of Hampden–Sydney College which became the VCU School of Medicine. The building has a large lecture hall, smaller classroom and simulation facilities, and an academic unit.

== Rankings ==
U.S. News and World Report 2024 rankings list VCU as a Tier 2 school in Best Medical Schools for Research and Primary Care.

== Notable alumni ==
Notable alumni include:

- Patch Adams, class of 1971
- Baruj Benacerraf, class of 1945: 1980 Nobel Prize in Medicine and Physiology
- William Chivous Bostic Sr., class of 1905
- Georgia Chenevix-Trench, class of 1985, Ph.D.
- Jean L. Harris, the first African-American student, class of 1955, became Virginia's Secretary of Health and Human Resources.
- Joseph C. Moxley (1884–1976), member of the Virginia House of Delegates
- Eduardo D. Rodriguez, class of 1999
- Jeffery Taubenberger, class of 1986, Ph.D. class of 1987
- Percy Wootton, class of 1957, past president, American Medical Association
