= Golden Years Murders =

Unsolved murders

Details
- Victims: 13+
- Span of crimes: 1990–1996
- Country: United States
- State: Virginia

The Golden Years Murders is the name given to an unsolved series of murders in the West End of Richmond, Virginia, from 1990 to 1996. During this period, at least thirteen elderly women were murdered in a similar manner, leading local authorities to suspect that they were dealing with a serial killer. Since then, multiple suspects have emerged and one even confessed to several of the killings, although his actual guilt is disputed.

== Murders ==
As victims, the perpetrator chose women aged from 55 to 89 who lived by themselves. The first six victims, all of whom were black, were stabbed to death between July 1990 and May 1992, while the remaining seven were white and were all strangled. Despite a rising homicide rate in the city at the time, these particular murders caused outrage due to the victims' vulnerability. As a result, precautions were taken, with a sharp increase in sales for guns, doorlocks and watchdogs and a more wary attitude from the female residents of Richmond.

In the mid-1990s, with assistance from the Richmond Police Department, several human rights organizations were allowed to form citizens' patrols. As time passed, the officials investigating the murders were accused of negligence and racism, with accusations from members of the NAACP claiming that they focused more attention to solving the murders involving the white victims.

=== List of victims ===
Initially, 17 women were considered possible victims, but four were later excluded after the killers in their respective cases were caught. The remaining thirteen are the following:

Number	Name	Age	Date of death
1	Mabel Venable	89	July 1, 1990
2	Eva Jones	80	October 2, 1990
3	Mary Coffee	61	October 3, 1990
4	Robinette Mickleberry	61	May 6, 1991
5	Pearl Gash	85	December 17, 1991
6	Martha Bolden	81	May 21, 1992
7	Phyllis G. Harris	59	August 16, 1994
8	Inez J. Childress	82	September 14, 1994
9	Lucille G. Boyd	75	January 1, 1996
10	Gertrude Gardner	77	February 22, 1996
11	Mamie Harris Verlander	84	March 28, 1996
12	Elizabeth Seibert	69	April 23, 1996
13	Jane E. Foster	55	April 24, 1996

== Prime suspect ==
A suspect in the crimes eventually emerged in 2000 – the man was 51-year-old Leslie Burchart, a mentally-ill vagrant. After being arrested for trespassing in July 1996, he unexpectedly confessed to killing three homeless men in the city, for which he was sentenced to life imprisonment. Three years later, he confessed to killing four of the victims on the official victim list for the Golden Years Murders: Jane Foster, Elizabeth Seibert, Mamie Verlander and Lucille Boyd.

In his testimony, Burchart described in detail the circumstances under which the murders took place and demonstrated knowledge that was supposedly known only to the investigators. However, as there was insufficient evidence to charge him with any of them, he was never tried, although he remained a prime suspect. Shortly before his death in 2002, Burchart suddenly recanted his confessions and proclaimed his innocence. Debates about his culpability have continued since then, with those supporting his claims of innocence pointing out that his confession should be considered dubious at best, as Burchart was a schizophrenic.

== Aftermath ==
In November 2013, retired police detective Ron Reed, who had been involved in Burchart's arrest and conducted interviews with him, stated his belief that Burchart had likely killed many more people than those he was convicted of. Among those he named as likely victims were 81-year-old Rachel Henshaw, who died at a nursing home in Richmond on June 20, 1996, and 47-year-old William R. Merrill, a homeless man whom Burchart had supposedly strangled with his own shirt on the street on June 18. Reed also claimed that his supervisor had forced him to classify Burchart's testimony, as the higher-ups feared that even more negative publicity would ruin the department entirely.

A few days later, representatives from the Richmond Police Department released a statement denying the claims, but indeed admitted that Henshaw and Merrill had died in June 1996. According to them, however, there was no sign of foul play in either death, as forensic analysis had determined that Henshaw had died of natural causes while Merrill died from alcohol poisoning.

As of March 2025, the majority of the murders remain unsolved and Burchart's guilt remains in question. If he was indeed responsible for killing the victims he admitted to, there is a possibility that the remaining cases were perpetrated by unrelated offenders.

== See also ==
- List of serial killers in the United States

== Bibliography ==
- Susan Hall (August 20, 2020). THE WORLD ENCYCLOPEDIA OF SERIAL KILLERS: Volume Two E-L. WildBlue Press. ISBN 978-1952225215.
