= VCU School of Education =

Coordinates: 37.5452°N 77.4551°W

Virginia Commonwealth University School of Education
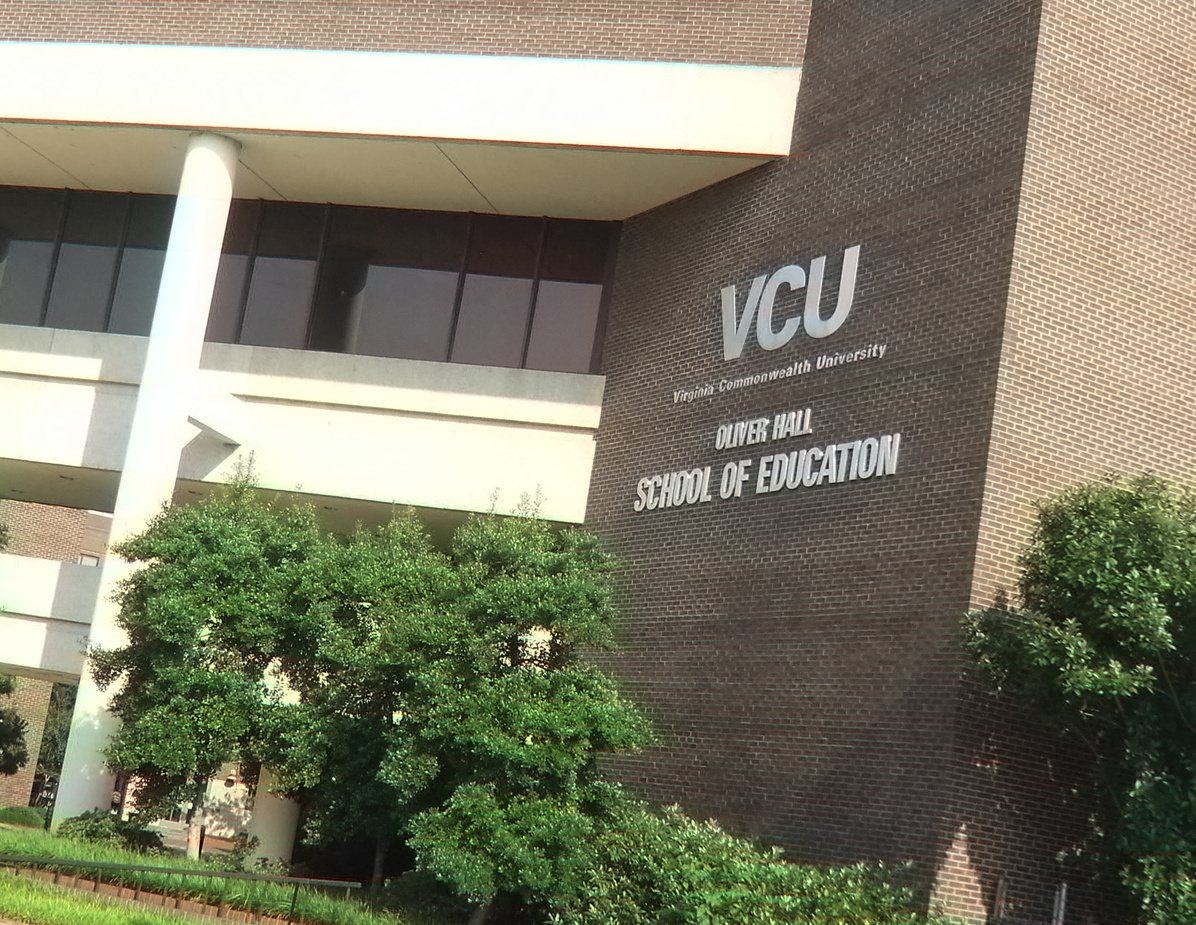
- Type: Public university
- Established: 1964
- Dean: Andrew P. Daire, Ph.D.
- Location: Richmond, Virginia, United States
- Campus: Monroe Park
- Website: soe.vcu.edu

Virginia Commonwealth University School of Education is a school of education located in the United States city of Richmond. It is a core institution for Virginia's teachers.

== History ==
The School of Education was created in 1964 in part of the Richmond Professional Institute. By the decision of the state legislature, that school became a part of VCU in 1968, along with the Medical College of Virginia. Roughly 3,800 students enrolled at VCU enroll in the School of Education.

== Departments ==
- Department of Counselor Education
- Department of Educational Leadership
- Department of Founders of Education
- Department of Health & Human Performance
- Department of Special Education & Disability Policy
- Department of Teaching and Learning
  - Child Development Center
