= VCU College of Health Professions =

Coordinates: 37°32′37.7″N 77°25′50.1″W

- Type: Public university
- Established: 1969
- Dean: Susan L. Parish, PhD, MSW
- Students: 1,300
- Location: Richmond, Virginia, United States
- Campus: MCV Campus
- Website: chp.vcu.edu

The Virginia Commonwealth University College of Health Professions, formerly known as the School of Allied Health Professions, is a school of health professions located in the United States city of Richmond. The school is part of Virginia Commonwealth University and is located on VCU's MCV Campus. It is one of only 116 member institutions in the Association of Schools of Allied Health Professions in the U.S.

== History ==
The College of Health Professions is located on VCU's MCV Campus and was created in 1969. The name of the college was formerly the "School of Allied Health Professions" but was changed to its current moniker in 2018. Today, the College enrolls approximately 1,300 students. All departments are headquartered in Richmond, Virginia. The Department of Nurse Anesthesia also offers its doctor of nurse anesthesia practice (DNAP) programs in Abingdon, Alexandria, and Roanoke, Virginia and in Richmond. The Department of Medical Laboratory Sciences offers BS and MS in medical laboratory science programs in Abingdon, Virginia and in Richmond.

Construction of a new 154,100 square foot building to house all of the academic and administrative units of the College was approved by the VCU Board of Visitors in May 2016. The various units and departments were previously spread across multiple VCU buildings and a rented facility near campus. Groundbreaking for the facility occurred in May 2017 on the site of former 1950s era dorms. Completed in March 2019, the 8-story building is a LEED Certified Silver facility.

== Departments ==
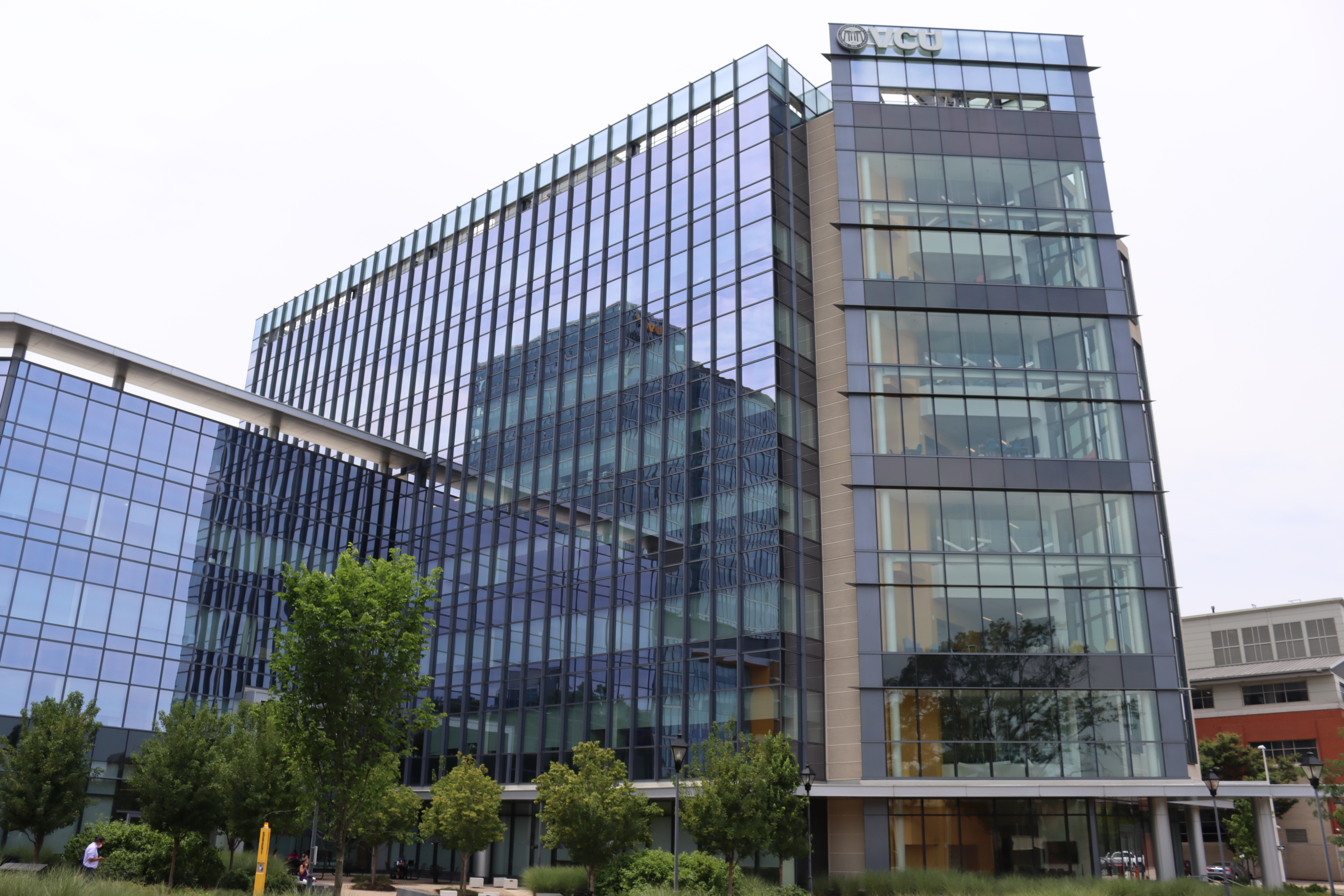
- College of Health Professions building, completed March 2019.
  Department of Medical Laboratory Sciences
- Department of Gerontology
- Department of Health Administration
- Department of Nurse Anesthesia
- Department of Occupational Therapy
- Department of Patient Counseling
- Department of Physical Therapy
- Department of Radiation Sciences
- Department of Rehabilitation and Mental Health Counseling

== Rankings ==
The multiple departments in the school have been repeatedly ranked as some of the best in the nation by multiple sources. Most recently, U.S. News & World Report has five of the departments ranked in the top twenty in their respective areas, with three of these being in the top five. These include:

- Health Services Administration 5th
- Rehabilitation Counseling 4th
- Nurse Anesthesia 1st
- Occupational Therapy 15th
- Physical Therapy 20th

Notably, the remaining four departments are in disciplines that U.S. News & World Report does not rank.
