= Richmond VA Medical Center =

Coordinates: 37.49796°N 77.46681°W

- Veterans Health Administration
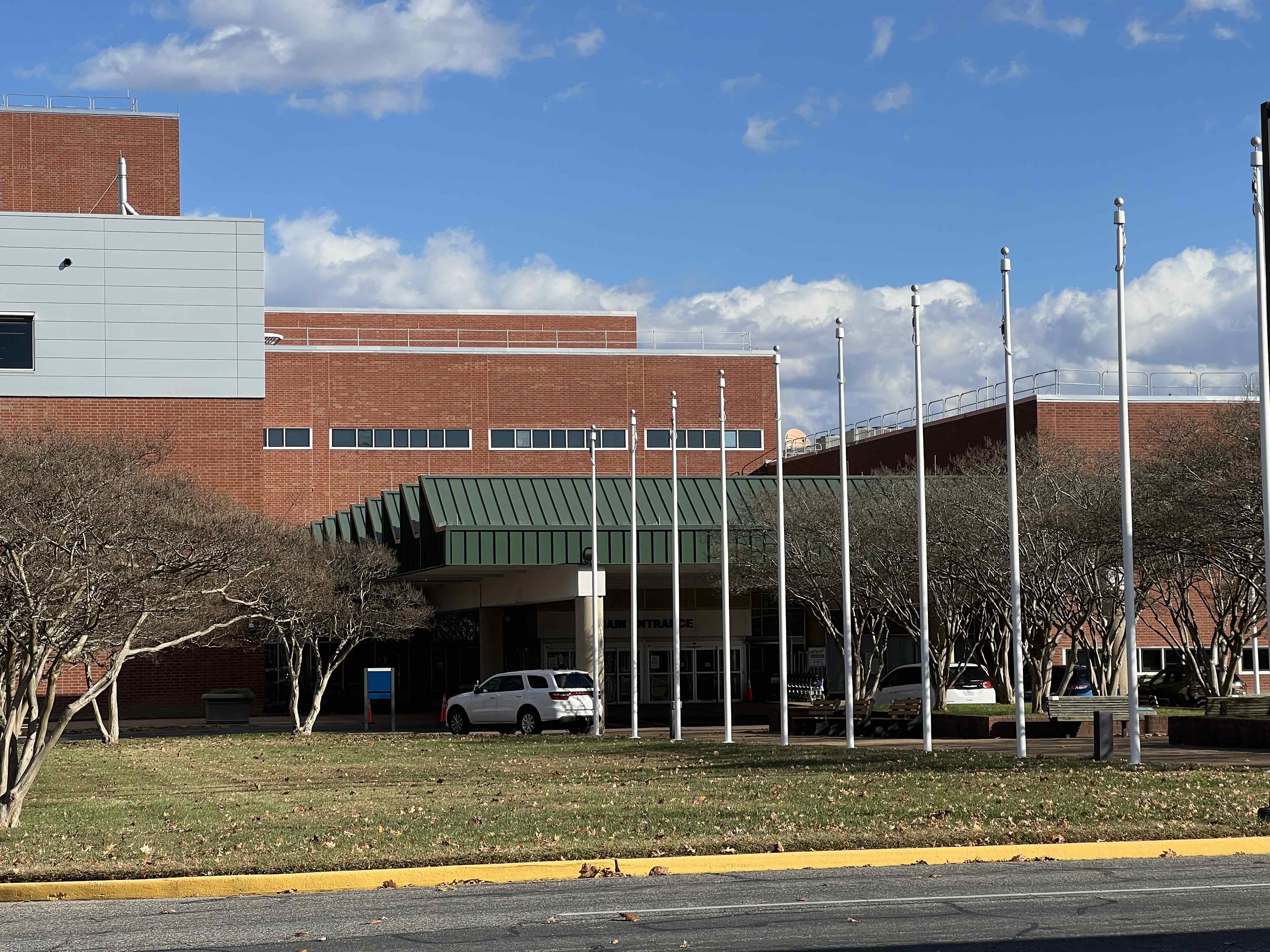

Geography
- Location: 1201 Broad Rock Boulevard, Richmond, Virginia, United States

History
- Opened: December 27, 1943

Links
- Lists: Hospitals in Virginia

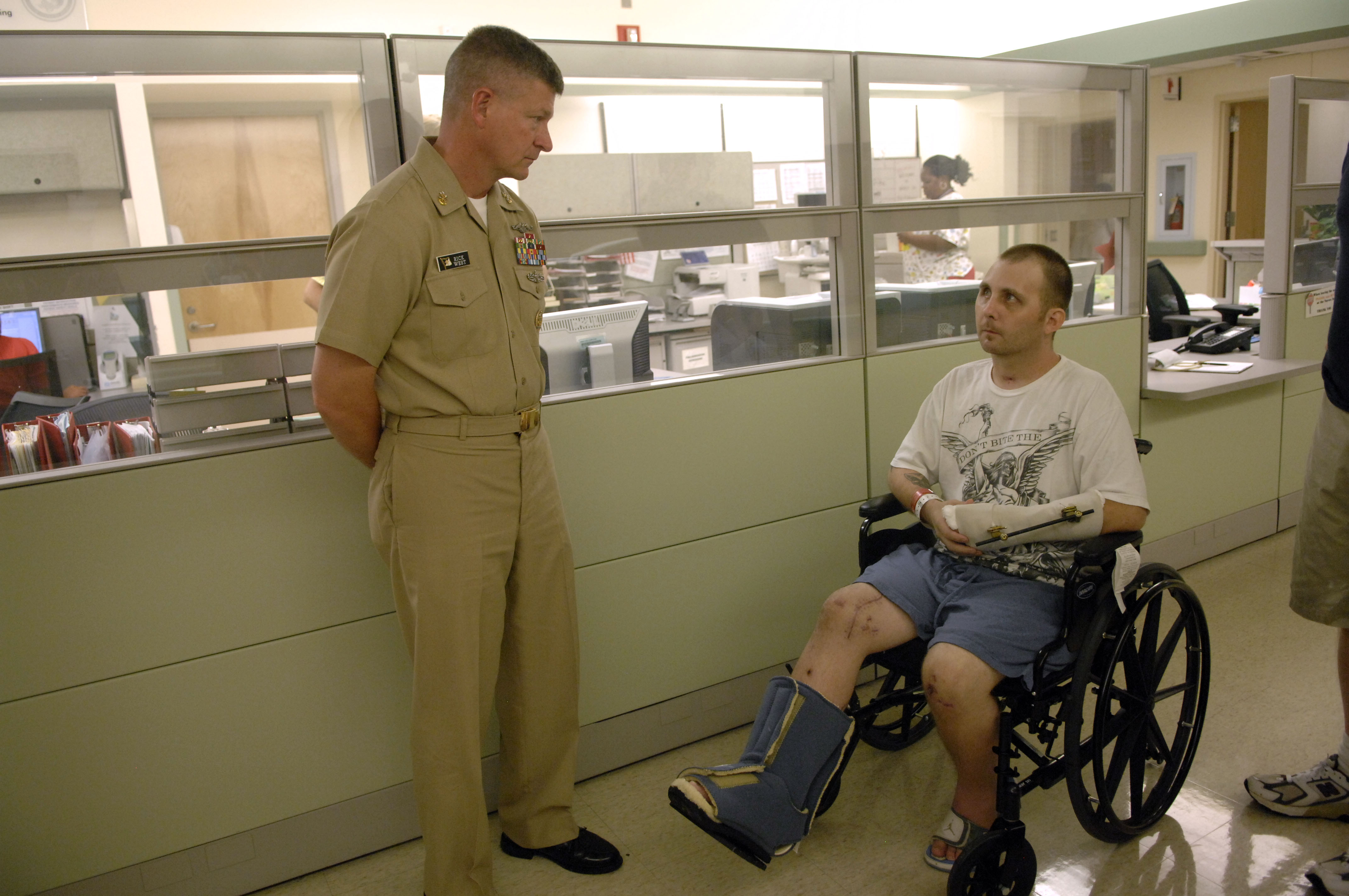
Master Chief Petty Officer of the Navy Rick West speaks with Construction Mechanic 2nd Class Michael Shepard at the Hunter Holmes McGuire Veterans Administration Medical Center

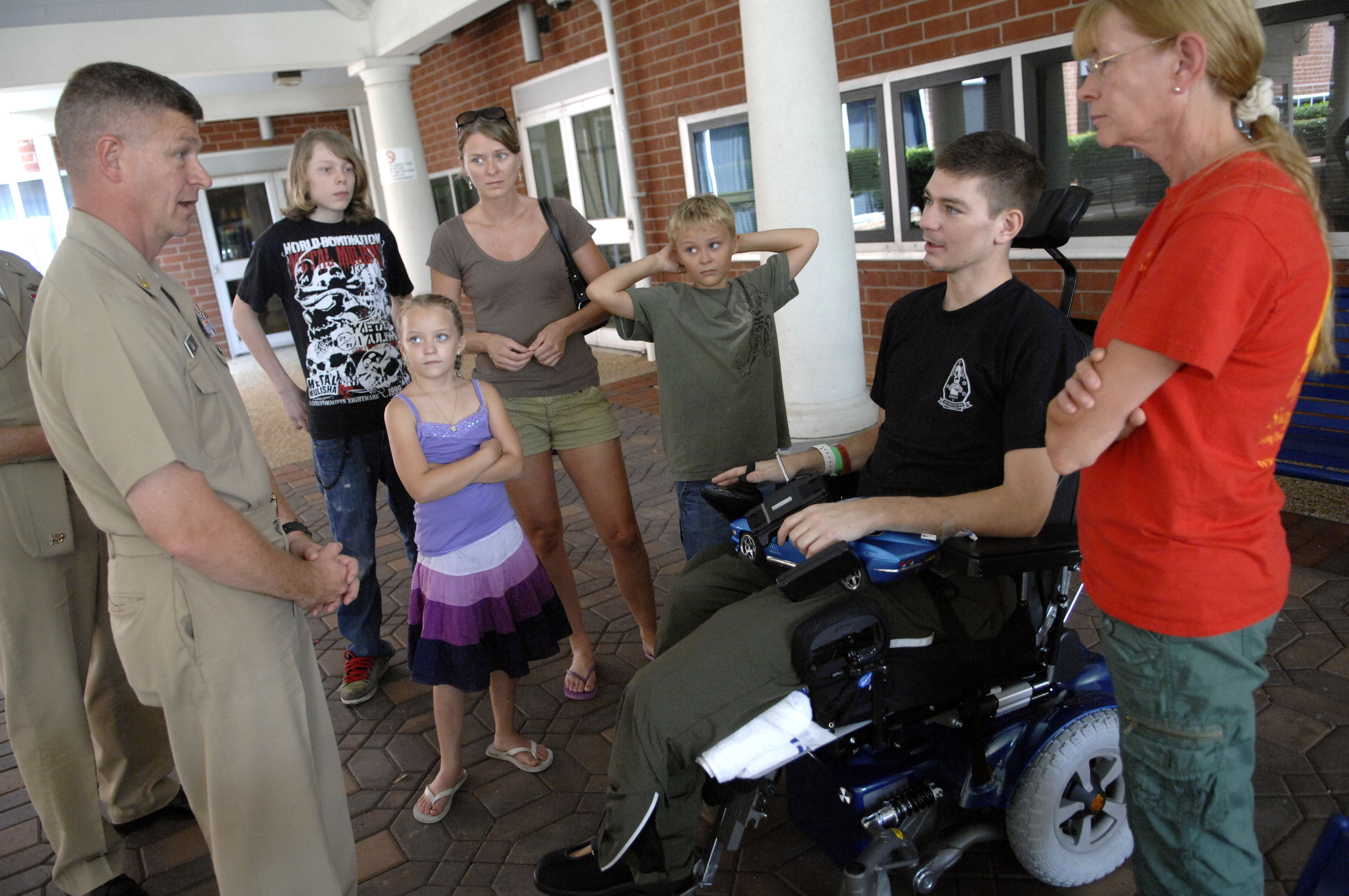
Marine Corps Sgt. Joshua Boucard and his family at the Hunter Holmes McGuire Veterans Administration Medical Center

Richmond Veterans Administration Medical Center, formerly known as Hunter Holmes McGuire VA Medical Center or McGuire VA Hospital, is located in Richmond, Virginia.

== History ==
The hospital was first activated on December 27, 1943, following four months of construction. Its first patients were received on June 30, 1944. The United States Army oversaw the hospital before it was handed over to the Veterans Administration on April 1, 1946.

In January 2023, The Department of Veterans Affairs (VA) medical center in Richmond, Virginia, officially changed its name from Hunter Holmes McGuire VA Medical Center to Richmond VA Medical Center.

VA Secretary Denis McDonough officially announced the change in a letter to the office of the late Rep. Donald McEachin, Virginia's 4th Congressional District, which also included notices to the Virginia Governor and Mayor of Richmond.

The change reflects the federal government's movement to rename facilities whose namesake honored Confederate Soldiers from the American Civil War, which lasted from 1861 to 1865. The facility was formerly named in honor of Hunter Holmes McGuire, M.D. (1835–1900), a famous Virginian notable for being the young personal physician to Confederate Major General Stonewall Jackson during the American Civil War (1861–1865).

The Richmond Veterans Administration Medical Center was established on the land of Broad Rock that was once a horse racing track built soon after the Civil War in Chesterfield County, Virginia. The land was purchased by Thomas Marcellous Cheatham in 1892 who built a home for himself and his new bride. The facility was established after World War II along State Route 10 and Richmond's Belt Boulevard, an early highway bypass. The Cheatham family had no choice but to give up their land under eminent domain. That area of the county, about 6 miles (10 km) from downtown Richmond in the Southside area, was annexed by the independent city in 1970.

The facility was the first Veterans Administration hospital to perform heart transplant surgery in the 1970s, under the leadership of Dr. Szabolcs Szentpetery. It is also a major facility for patients with spinal cord injuries. The physical plant was entirely rebuilt and expanded in the late 20th century. A building there is named for WW2 Medal of Honor recipient Van T. Barfoot.

Richmond Veterans Administration Medical Center offers alternative medicine such as acupuncture and a "zen den".
