= 1927 =

1927 in various calendars
- Gregorian calendar: 1927; MCMXXVII
- Ab urbe condita: 2680
- Armenian calendar: 1376; ԹՎ ՌՅՀԶ
- Assyrian calendar: 6677
- Baháʼí calendar: 83–84
- Balinese saka calendar: 1848–1849
- Bengali calendar: 1333–1334
- Berber calendar: 2877
- British Regnal year: 17 Geo. 5 – 18 Geo. 5
- Buddhist calendar: 2471
- Burmese calendar: 1289
- Byzantine calendar: 7435–7436
- Chinese calendar: 丙寅年 (Fire Tiger); 4624 or 4417 — to — 丁卯年 (Fire Rabbit); 4625 or 4418
- Coptic calendar: 1643–1644
- Discordian calendar: 3093
- Ethiopian calendar: 1919–1920
- Hebrew calendar: 5687–5688
- Hindu calendars
- Vikram Samvat: 1983–1984
- Shaka Samvat: 1848–1849
- Kali Yuga: 5027–5028
- Holocene calendar: 11927
- Igbo calendar: 927–928
- Iranian calendar: 1305–1306
- Islamic calendar: 1345–1346
- Japanese calendar: Shōwa 2 (昭和２年)
- Javanese calendar: 1857–1858
- Juche calendar: 16
- Julian calendar: Gregorian minus 13 days
- Korean calendar: 4260
- Minguo calendar: ROC 16 民國16年
- Nanakshahi calendar: 459
- Thai solar calendar: 2469–2470
- Tibetan calendar: མེ་ཕོ་སྟག་ལོ་ (male Fire-Tiger); 2053 or 1672 or 900 — to — མེ་མོ་ཡོས་ལོ་ (female Fire-Hare); 2054 or 1673 or 901

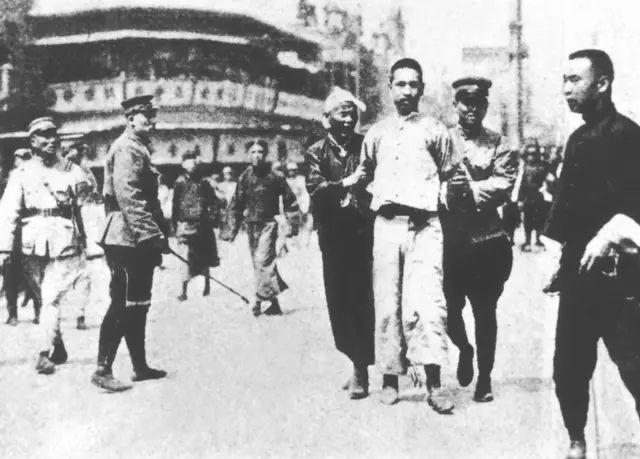
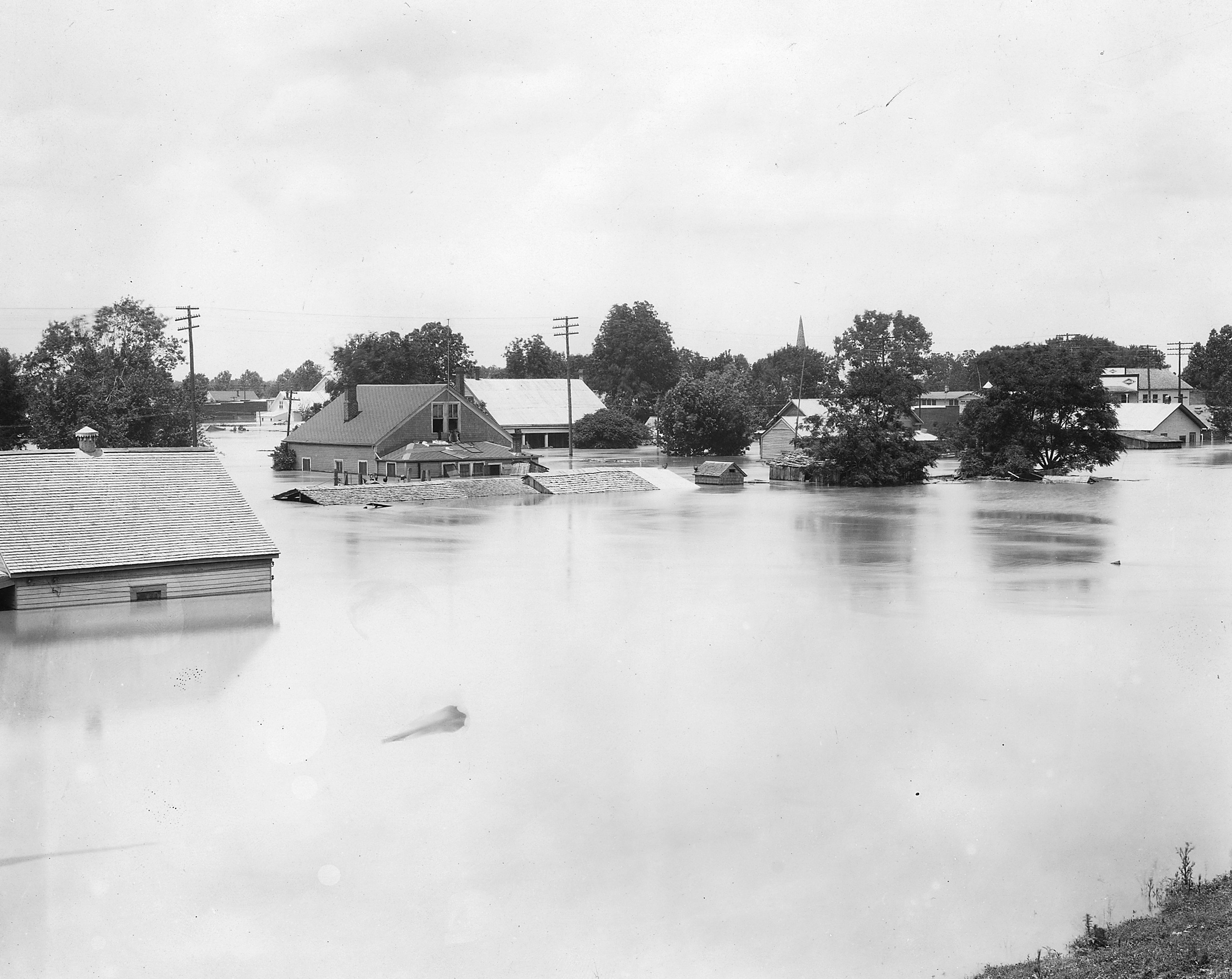
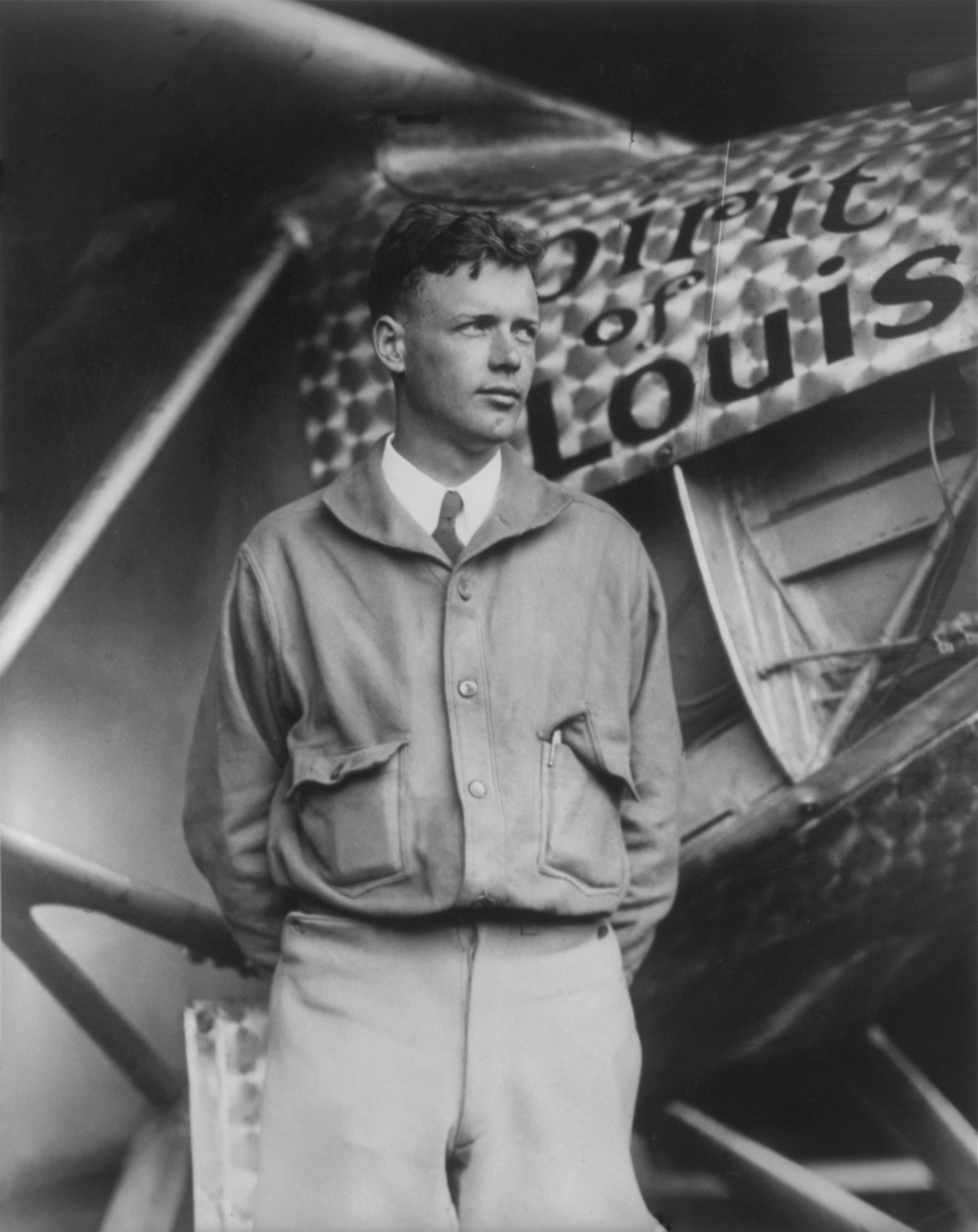
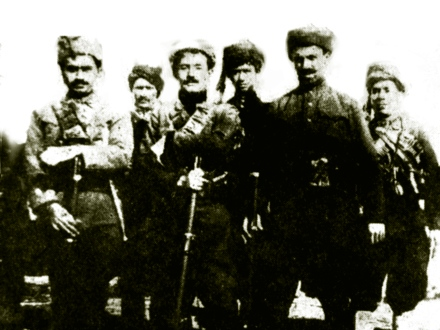
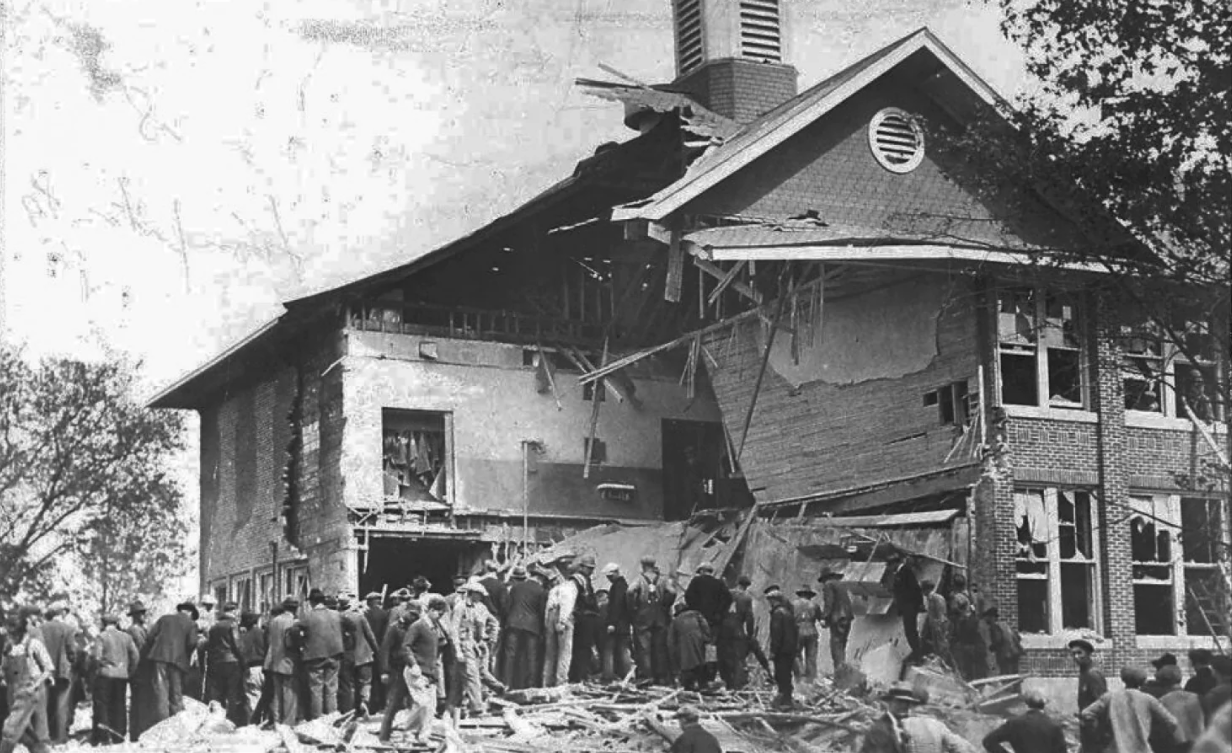
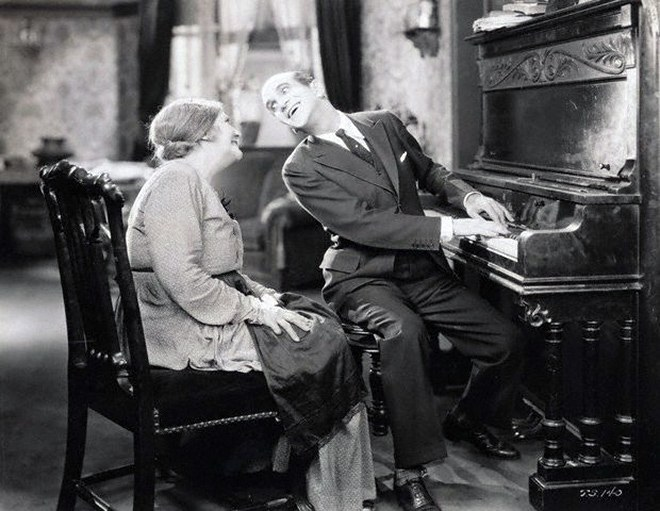
From top to bottom, left to right:
- The Chinese Civil War intensifies as the Shanghai massacre sees Chiang Kai-shek purge Communists from the Kuomintang, while the Autumn Harvest Uprising led by Mao Zedong marks an early Communist insurrection;
- The Great Mississippi Flood of 1927 devastates seven U.S. states, displacing hundreds of thousands;
- Aviator Charles Lindbergh completes the first solo nonstop transatlantic flight in the Spirit of St. Louis from New York to Paris;
- The Ararat rebellion erupts as Kurdish nationalists resist Turkish rule in eastern Anatolia;
- The Bath School disaster in Michigan kills 45 in the deadliest U.S. school bombing;
- The Jazz Singer introduces synchronized sound, launching the era of “talkies” and transforming cinema.

1927 (MCMXXVII) was a common year starting on Saturday of the Gregorian calendar, the 1927th year of the Common Era (CE) and Anno Domini (AD) designations, the 927th year of the 2nd millennium, the 27th year of the 20th century, and the 8th year of the 1920s decade.

== Events ==
=== January ===
- January 1 – The British Broadcasting Company becomes the British Broadcasting Corporation, when its royal charter of incorporation takes effect. John Reith becomes the first Director-General.
- January 7
  - The first transatlantic telephone call is made via radio from New York City, United States, to London, United Kingdom.
  - The Harlem Globetrotters exhibition basketball team play their first ever road game in Hinckley, Illinois.
- January 9 – The Laurier Palace Theatre fire at a movie theatre in Montreal, Quebec, Canada, kills 78 children.
- January 10 – Fritz Lang's futuristic film Metropolis is released in Germany.
- January 11 – Louis B. Mayer, head of film studio Metro-Goldwyn-Mayer (MGM), announces the creation of the Academy of Motion Picture Arts and Sciences, at a banquet in Los Angeles, California.
- January 24 – U.S. Marines invade Nicaragua by orders of President Calvin Coolidge, intervening in the Nicaraguan Civil War, and remaining in the country until 1933.

=== February ===
- February – Werner Heisenberg formulates his famous uncertainty principle, while employed as a lecturer at Niels Bohr's Institute for Theoretical Physics at the University of Copenhagen.
- February 7 – An attempted military coup in Lisbon, Portugal, is successfully put down.
- February 12 – British troops land in Shanghai as a result of UK government concerns about the safety of residents in the British settlement.
- February 14 – A magnitude 6.1 earthquake, with a maximum MSK intensity of VII–VIII (Very strong – Damaging), kills 50 in Yugoslavia.
- February 19
  - A general strike takes place in Shanghai in protest against the presence of British troops.
  - In the United States, the silent romantic comedy film It starring Clara Bow, is released, popularising the concept of the "It girl".
- February 23 – The U.S. Federal Radio Commission (later renamed the Federal Communications Commission) begins to regulate the use of radio frequencies.

=== March ===
- March 4 – A diamond rush in South Africa includes trained athletes, who have been hired by major companies to stake claims.
- March 7 – 1927 Kita Tango earthquake: A 7.0 M_{w} earthquake kills at least 2,925 in the Toyooka and Mineyama areas of western Honshu, in Japan.
- March 14 – Pan American World Airways is founded by Juan T. Trippe.
- March 24 – Nanking Incident: After six foreigners have been killed in Nanking, and it appears that Kuomintang and Chinese Communist Party forces will overrun the foreign consulates, warships of the U.S. Navy and the British Royal Navy fire shells and shoot to disperse the crowds.
- March 29 – Henry Segrave breaks the land speed record, driving the Sunbeam 1000 hp at Daytona Beach, Florida.

=== April ===
- April 7 – Bell Telephone Co. transmits an image of Herbert Hoover (then the Secretary of Commerce), which becomes the first successful long distance demonstration of television.
- April 12
  - The Royal and Parliamentary Titles Act 1927 renames the United Kingdom of Great Britain and Ireland as the United Kingdom of Great Britain and Northern Ireland. The change acknowledges that the Irish Free State is no longer part of the Kingdom.
  - April 12 Incident (Shanghai Massacre): Kuomintang troops kill a number of communist-supporting workers in Shanghai. The 1st United Front between the Nationalists and Communist ends, and the Civil War lasting until 1949 begins.
- April 18 – The Kuomintang (Nationalist Chinese) set up a government in Nanking, China.
- April 21 – A banking crisis hits Japan.
- April 22–May 5 – The Great Mississippi Flood of 1927 strikes 700,000 people, in the greatest natural disaster in American history through this time.
- April 23 – Cardiff City wins the FA Cup, beating Arsenal 1–0; it is the only time a team from outside England has won the competition.
- April 27
  - The Carabineros de Chile (Chilean national police force and gendarmerie) are created.
  - João Ribeiro de Barros becomes the first non-European to make a transatlantic flight, flying from Genoa, Italy, to Fernando de Noronha, Brazil.

=== May ===
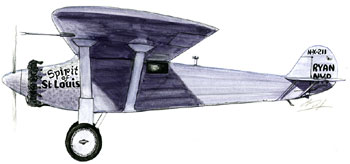
May 20: Solo flight New York to Paris

- May – Philo Farnsworth of the United States transmits his first experimental electronic television motion pictures, as opposed to the electromechanical TV systems that others have used before.
- May 9 – The Australian Parliament convenes for the first time in Canberra, Australian Capital Territory. Previously, the Parliament had met in Melbourne, Victoria.
- May 11 – The Academy of Motion Picture Arts and Sciences, which will create the Academy Awards, is founded in the United States.
- May 12 – British police officers raid the office of the Soviet trade delegation in London.
- May 17 – U.S. Army aviation pioneer Major Harold Geiger dies in the crash of his Airco DH.4 airplane, at Olmsted Field, Pennsylvania.
- May 18 – Bath School disaster: A series of violent attacks by a school official results in 45 deaths, mostly of children, in Bath Township, Michigan, United States.
- May 20 – By the Treaty of Jeddah, the United Kingdom recognizes the sovereignty of Ibn Saud over the Kingdom of Hejaz and Nejd, the future Saudi Arabia.
- May 20–21 – Charles Lindbergh makes the first solo, nonstop transatlantic airplane flight, from New York City to Paris, France, in his single-engined aircraft, the Spirit of St. Louis.
- May 22 – The 7.6 M_{w} Gulang earthquake affects Gansu in northwest China with a maximum Mercalli intensity of XI (Extreme), leaving over 40,000 dead.
- May 23 – Nearly 600 members of the American Institute of Electrical Engineers and the Institute of Radio Engineers view a live demonstration of television at the Bell Telephone Building in New York City, just over a year after John Logie Baird of Scotland had first demonstrated an electromechanical system to members of the Royal Society in London.
- May 24 – The United Kingdom cuts its diplomatic relations with the Soviet Union due to revelations of espionage and underground agitation.

=== June ===
- June – The volcanic island of Anak Krakatau begins to form in the Sunda Strait of Indonesia.
- June 4 – Yugoslavia severs diplomatic relations with Albania.
- June 4–6 – Clarence Chamberlin and Charles Albert Levine take off from Roosevelt Field, New York, and fly to Eisleben, Germany, in the Wright-Bellanca WB-2 Columbia aircraft Miss Columbia, two weeks after Charles Lindbergh's historic solo flight.
- June 9 – The Soviet Union executes 20 people for alleged espionage in retaliation for the assassination two days earlier of Pyotr Voykov, the Soviet ambassador to Poland, at the railway station in Warsaw. Voykov had been shot by 19-year-old Boris Kowerda, an exiled Russian, in retaliation for having signed the death warrants in 1918 for Tsar Nicholas II and the Russian Imperial Family.
- June 13 – Léon Daudet, the leader of the French monarchists, is arrested in France.
- June 29 – Solar eclipse of June 29, 1927: A total eclipse of the sun takes place over Wales, northern England, southern Scotland, Norway, northern Sweden, northmost Finland, and the northmost extremes of Russia.
- June 29–July 1 – Commander Richard E. Byrd, Bernt Balchen, George Noville and Bert Acosta take off from Roosevelt Field, New York, in the Fokker Trimotor airplane America, and cross the Atlantic to the coast of France, having to ditch there because of bad weather; all four men survive the emergency landing.

=== July ===
- July 1 – The Food, Drug, and Insecticide Administration (FDIA) is established as a United States federal agency.
- July 10 – Timothy Coughlan, Bill Gannon and Archie Doyle, members of the anti-Treaty Irish Republican Army, shoot dead Kevin O'Higgins, Vice-President of the Executive Council of the Irish Free State and Minister for Justice, as O'Higgins is walking to Mass in Dublin.
- July 11 – The 1927 Jericho earthquake strikes Palestine, killing around 300 people; it is the largest ever recorded in this part of the Middle East. The effects are especially severe in Nablus, but damage and fatalities are also reported in many areas of Palestine and Transjordan, such as Amman, Salt, Jordan, and Lydda.
- July 13 (Wednesday, Tamuz 13, 5687): 12:30 – Rebbe Yosef Yitzchak Schneersohn is freed from the imprisonment which began on June 15 (Wednesday, Sivan 15, 5687) at 02:15 in exile, in the Russian town of Kostroma.
- July 15 – July Revolt of 1927: After police in Vienna fire on an angry crowd, 85 protesters (mostly members of the Social Democratic Party of Austria) and 5 policemen are left dead; more than 600 people are injured.
- July 24 – The Menin Gate is dedicated as a war memorial at Ypres, Belgium.

=== August ===
- August 1 – The Communist Chinese People's Liberation Army is formed, during the Nanchang Uprising.
- August 2 – American electrical engineer Harold Stephen Black invents the negative-feedback amplifier.
- August 7 – The Peace Bridge opens between Fort Erie, Ontario, and Buffalo, New York.
- August 10 – The Mount Rushmore Park is rededicated in the United States. President Calvin Coolidge promises national funding for the proposed carving of the presidential figures.
- August 24–25 – The 1927 Nova Scotia hurricane hits the Atlantic Provinces of Canada, causing massive damage and at least 56 deaths.

=== September ===
- September – The Autumn Harvest Uprising occurs in China.
- September 7 – The first fully electronic television system is achieved by Philo Farnsworth.
- September 18 – The Columbia Phonographic Broadcasting System (later known as CBS) is formed in the United States, and goes on the air with 47 radio stations.
- September 25 – A treaty signed by the League of Nations Slavery Commission abolishes all types of slavery.
- September 29 – The East St. Louis Tornado kills 79 people and injures 550, the 2nd costliest and at least 24th deadliest tornado in U.S. history.

=== October ===
- October – Niels Bohr presents his theoretical principle of complementarity at the Fifth Solvay Conference on Physics.
- October 4 – Carving of the sculptures at Mount Rushmore, South Dakota, begins.
- October 6 – The Jazz Singer, starring Al Jolson, premieres at the Warner Theater in New York City. Although not the first sound film, and containing very little recorded speech, it is the first to become a box-office hit, popularizing "talkies" (although silent films continue to be made for some time).
- October 9 – The Mexican government crushes a rebellion in Veracruz.
- October 25 – The Italian ocean liner Principessa Mafalda capsizes off Porto Seguro, Brazil; at least 314 people are killed.

=== November ===
- November 1 – İsmet İnönü forms a new government in Turkey (the 5th government).
- November 3–4 – Great Vermont Flood of 1927: Floods devastating Vermont cause the "worst natural disaster in the state's history".
- November 12
  - Leon Trotsky is expelled from the Soviet Communist Party, leaving Joseph Stalin with undisputed control of the Soviet Union.
  - The Holland Tunnel opens to traffic, as the first vehicular tunnel under the Hudson River, linking New Jersey with New York City.
- November 14 – Pittsburgh gasometer explosion: Three Equitable Gas storage tanks in the North Side of Pittsburgh explode, killing 26 people and causing damage estimated between $4.0 million and $5.0 million.
- November 21 – The Columbine Mine massacre: Colorado state police open fire on 500 rowdy but unarmed miners during a strike, killing 6.

=== December ===
- December – The Communist Party Congress condemns all deviation from the general party line in the USSR.
- December 1 – Chiang Kai-shek marries Soong Mei-ling in Shanghai.
- December 14 – Iraq gains independence from the United Kingdom.
- December 17
  - United States Navy submarine S-4 is accidentally rammed and sunk by United States Coast Guard cutter John Paulding off Provincetown, Massachusetts, killing everyone aboard despite several unsuccessful attempts to raise the submarine.
  - Australian cricketer Bill Ponsford makes 437 runs to break his own world record for the highest first-class cricket score at Melbourne Cricket Ground.
- December 19 – Three members of the revolutionary movement for Indian independence – Pandit Ram Prasad Bismil, Thakur Roshan Singh and Ashfaqulla Khan – are executed by the British Raj. Rajendra Nath Lahiri had been executed two days before.
- December 29 – Eruption of the Perboewatan and Danan undersea volcanoes near Krakatoa, create the foundation for Anak Krakatau Island.
- December 30 – The first Asian commuter metro line, the Tokyo Metro Ginza Line, opens in Japan.

== Births ==
=== January–February ===
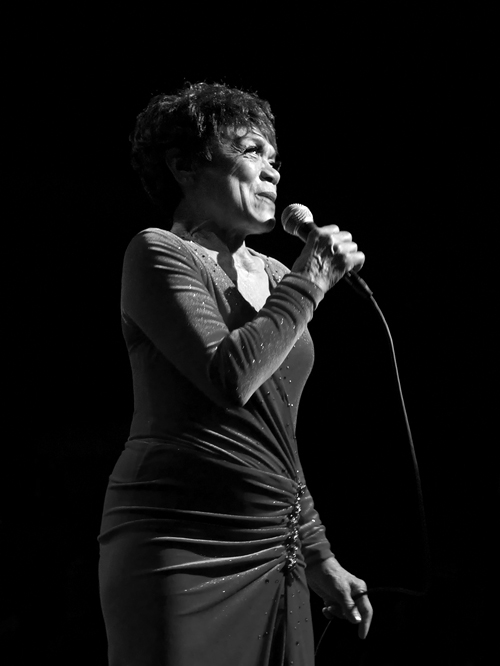
Eartha Kitt

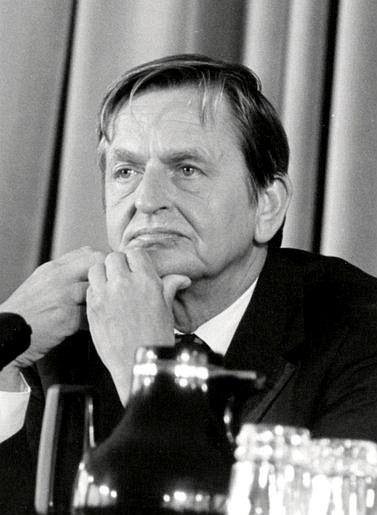
Olof Palme

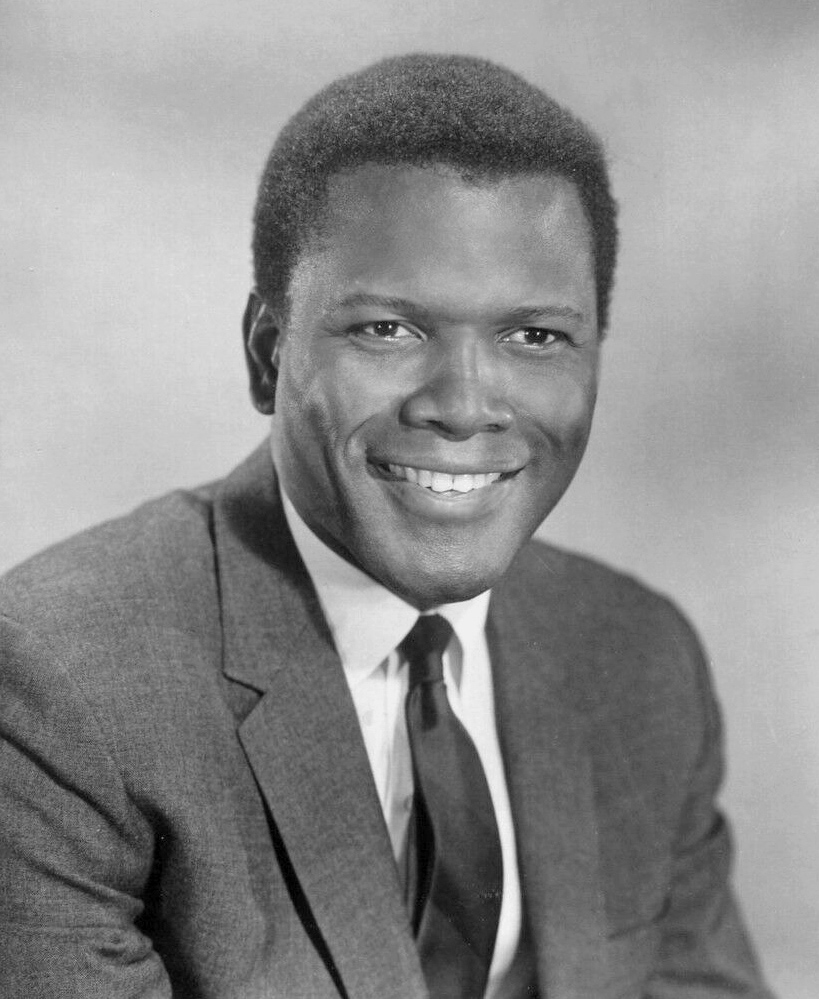
Sidney Poitier

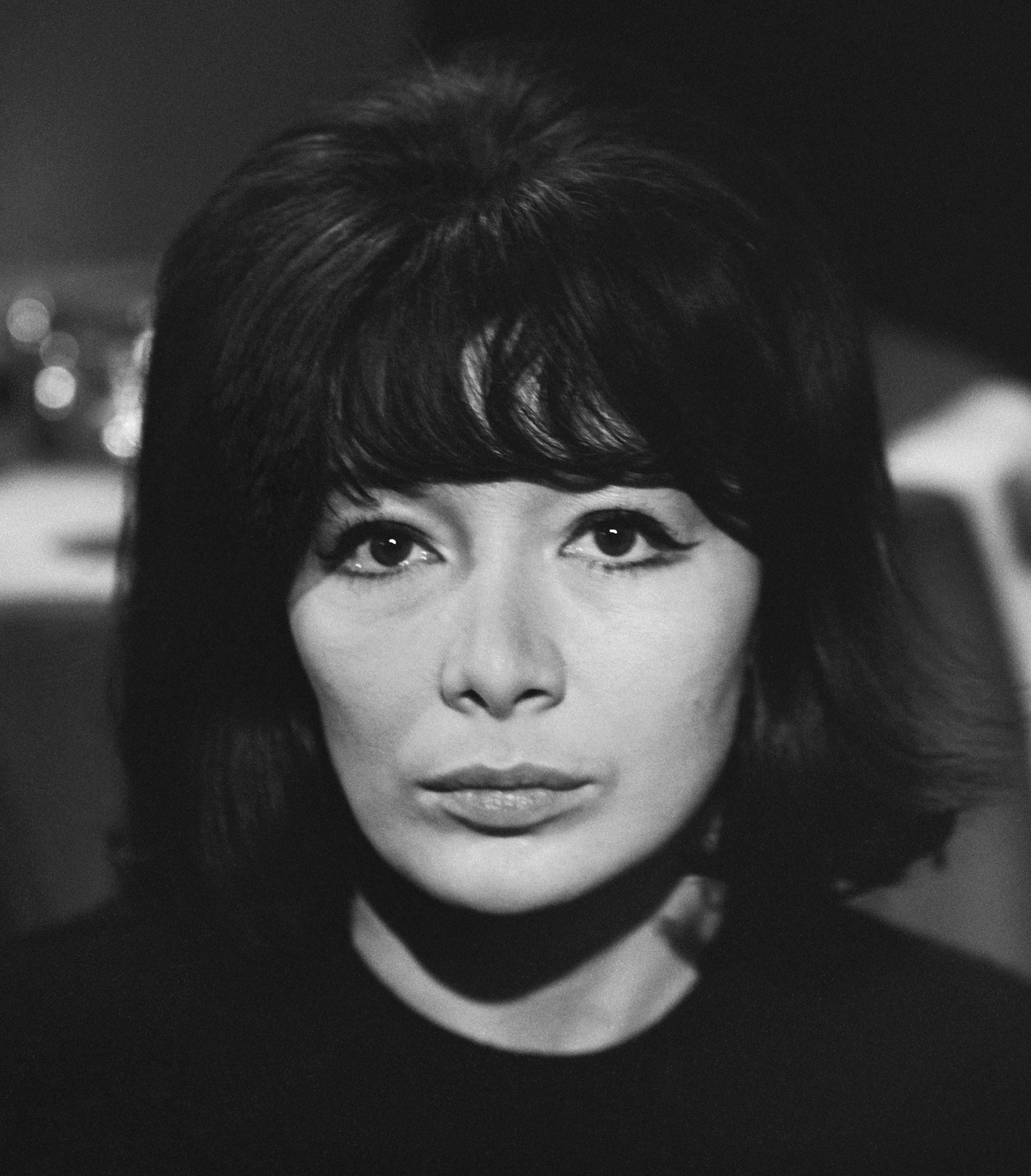
Juliette Gréco

- January 1
  - Maurice Béjart, French-Swiss dancer, choreographer and director (d. 2007)
  - Vernon L. Smith, American economist, Nobel laureate
  - Kazi M Badruddoza, Bangladeshi agronomist, Independence Award laureate (d. 2023)
- January 4 – Barbara Rush, American actress (d. 2024)
- January 10
  - Johnnie Ray, American singer (d. 1990)
  - Otto Stich, member of the Swiss Federal Council (d. 2012)
- January 13 – Sydney Brenner, South African biologist, Nobel Prize laureate (d. 2019)
- January 15
  - Kirti Nidhi Bista, Nepali politician, three times prime minister (d. 2017)
  - Yaakov Heruti, Israeli Zionist militant and political activist (d. 2022)
- January 17 – Eartha Kitt, African-American singer, actress, activist and author (d. 2008)
- January 20 – Qurratulain Hyder, Indian journalist and academic (d. 2007)
- January 25 – Antônio Carlos Jobim, Brazilian composer (d. 1994)
- January 26 – José Azcona del Hoyo, 26th President of Honduras (d. 2005)
- January 28
  - Per Oscarsson, Swedish actor (d. 2010)
  - Ronnie Scott, English jazz saxophonist (d. 1996)
- January 29 – Lewis Urry, Canadian inventor (d. 2004)
- January 30 – Olof Palme, Prime Minister of Sweden (d. 1986)
- February 1 – Galway Kinnell, American poet (d. 2014)
- February 2 – Stan Getz, American musician (d. 1991)
- February 3 – Kenneth Anger, American actor, director and screenwriter (d. 2023)
- February 7 – Juliette Gréco, French singer, actress (d. 2020)
- February 8 – George Taliaferro, American football player (d. 2018)
- February 10 – Leontyne Price, African-American soprano
- February 12 – Ejaz Azim, Pakistani lieutenant general, diplomat (d. 1998)
- February 15 – Harvey Korman, American actor, comedian (d. 2008)
- February 16 – June Brown, English actress (d. 2022)
- February 17 – John Selfridge, American mathematician (d. 2010)
- February 18 – John Warner, American politician (d. 2021)
- February 20
  - Roy Cohn, American lawyer, anti-Communist (d. 1986)
  - Sidney Poitier, Bahamian-American actor, film director, (Oscar winner for Lilies of the Field) (d. 2022)
- February 21 – Hubert de Givenchy, French fashion designer (d. 2018)
- February 22
  - Emil Bobu, Romanian Communist activist, politician (d. 2014)
  - Guy Mitchell, American singer and actor (d. 1999)
- February 24 – Emmanuelle Riva, French actress (d. 2017)
- February 25 – Ralph Stanley, American bluegrass banjo player and vocalist (d. 2016)
- February 27 – Peter Whittle, New Zealand mathematician (d. 2021)

=== March–April ===
- March 1
  - George O. Abell, American astronomer, professor at UCLA, science popularizer, and skeptic (d. 1983)
  - Harry Belafonte, Jamaican-American musician, actor, and civil rights activist (d. 2023)
- March 2 – Roger Walkowiak, French road bicycle racer (d. 2017)
- March 4 – Dick Savitt, American tennis player (d. 2023)
- March 5 – Jack Cassidy, American stage, screen and television actor (d. 1976)
- March 6
  - Gordon Cooper, American astronaut (d. 2004)
  - Gabriel García Márquez, Colombian author, Nobel Prize laureate (d. 2014)
- March 8
  - Dick Hyman, American jazz pianist and composer
  - Stanisław Kania, Polish communist politician (d. 2020)
- March 10 – Jupp Derwall, German football player and manager (d. 2007)
- March 12
  - Raúl Alfonsín, former President of Argentina (d. 2009)
  - Sudharmono, 5th Vice President of Indonesia (d. 2006)
- March 16
  - Vladimir Komarov, Russian cosmonaut (d. 1967)
  - Daniel Patrick Moynihan, American author, politician, and statesman (d. 2003)
- March 17 – Roberto Suazo Córdova, President of Honduras (d. 2018)
- March 18 – John Kander, American composer
- March 21 – Hans-Dietrich Genscher, German politician (d. 2016)
- March 25 – Tina Anselmi, Italian politician (d. 2016)
- March 27
  - Mstislav Rostropovich, Russian cellist and conductor (d. 2007)
  - Karl Stotz, Austrian football player (d. 2017)
- March 29 – John Vane, British pharmacologist, Nobel Prize laureate (d. 2004)
- March 31
  - César Chávez, American labor activist, United Farm Workers founder (d. 1993)
  - William Daniels, American actor
- April 1
  - Ferenc Puskás, Hungarian footballer (d. 2006)
  - Dennis Stanfill, American film studio executive.
- April 3 – Éva Székely, Hungarian swimmer (d. 2020)
- April 5 – Thanin Kraivichien, Thai lawyer and politician, Prime Minister 1976–77 (d. 2025)
- April 6
  - Gerry Mulligan, American musician (d. 1996)
  - Fethia Mzali, Tunisian teacher and politician (d. 2018)
- April 9 – Tiny Hill, New Zealand rugby union player and selector (d. 2019)
- April 10 – Marshall Warren Nirenberg, American scientist, Nobel Prize laureate (d. 2010)
- April 11 – Abd al-Majid al-Rafei, Lebanese politician (d. 2017)
- April 12 – Alvin Sargent, American screenwriter (d. 2019)
- April 14
  - Alan MacDiarmid, New Zealand chemist, Nobel Prize laureate (d. 2007)
  - Agnes Ullmann, Hungarian-French microbiologist, worked at National Centre for Scientific Research and the Pasteur Institute (d. 2019)
- April 15 – Robert Mills, American physicist (d. 1999)
- April 16 – Pope Benedict XVI (d. 2022)
- April 17 – Margot Honecker, East German politician (d. 2016)
- April 18
  - Samuel P. Huntington, American political scientist (d. 2008)
  - Tadeusz Mazowiecki, 1st Prime Minister of Poland (d. 2013)
  - Charles Pasqua, French businessman, politician (d. 2015)
- April 20
  - Phil Hill, American race car driver (d. 2008)
  - Karl Alexander Müller, Swiss physicist, Nobel Prize laureate (d. 2023)
- April 24
  - Josy Barthel, Luxembourgish athlete (d. 1992)
  - Trudi Birger, German Holocaust survivor and writer (d. 2002).
- April 25 – Albert Uderzo, French author and illustrator (d. 2020)
- April 27
  - Coretta Scott King, African-American civil rights leader, wife of Rev. Dr. Martin Luther King Jr. (d. 2006)
  - Yao Xian, Chinese general (d. 2018)
- April 29 – Dorothy Manley, English athlete (d. 2021)

=== May–June ===
- May 1
  - Greta Andersen, Danish Olympic swimmer (d. 2023)
  - Rusli Noor, 8th Secretary-General of the Association of Southeast Asian Nations
  - Albert Zafy, 3rd President of Madagascar (d. 2017)
- May 4 – Marella Agnelli, Italian art collector and socialite (d. 2019)
- May 9
  - Manfred Eigen, German biophysicist, recipient of the Nobel Prize in Chemistry (d. 2019)
  - Juan Jose Pizzuti, Argentine football striker and football manager (d. 2020)
- May 10 – Nayantara Sahgal, Indian author
- May 11 – Mort Sahl, Canadian-born comedian and political commentator (d. 2021)
- May 13 – Herbert Ross, American film director (d. 2001)
- May 14
  - Herbert W. Franke, Austrian scientist, author (d. 2022)
  - Frank Miller, Canadian politician, Premier of Ontario 1985 (d. 2018)
- May 20 – David Hedison, American actor (d. 2019)
- May 22 – George Andrew Olah, Hungarian-born chemist, Nobel Prize laureate (d. 2017)
- May 25 – Robert Ludlum, American author (d. 2001)
- May 26
  - Jacques Bergerac, French actor (d. 2014)
  - Endel Tulving, Estonian-Canadian psychologist and cognitive neuroscientist (d. 2023)
- May 30 – Clint Walker, American actor (d. 2018)
- June 3 – Boots Randolph, American saxophone player (d. 2007)
- June 6 – Elijah Mudenda, Zambian politician, prime minister 1975–1977 (d. 2008)
- June 8
  - Pavel Kharin, Soviet Olympic canoeist (d. 2023)
  - Jerry Stiller, American comedian, actor (d. 2020)
- June 10 – László Kubala, Hungarian football player and manager (d. 2002)
- June 13
  - Slim Dusty, Australian country singer (d. 2003)
  - Yoshiro Hayashi, Japanese politician (d. 2017)
  - Franco Maria Malfatti, Italian politician (d. 1991)
- June 16 – Ya'akov Hodorov, Israeli footballer (d. 2006)
- June 20 – Bernard Cahier, French photojournalist (d. 2008)
- June 23 – Bob Fosse, American choreographer, director (d. 1987)
- June 24 – Martin Lewis Perl, American physicist, Nobel Prize laureate (d. 2014)
- June 27 – Cino Tortorella, Italian television presenter (d. 2017)
- June 28
  - Frank Sherwood Rowland, American chemist, Nobel Prize laureate (d. 2012)
  - Boris Shilkov, Soviet speed skater (d. 2015)
  - Ann Aldrich, American district judge from 1980 to 2010 (d. 2010)
- June 30
  - Sleim Ammar, Tunisian neuropsychiatrist and poet (d. 1999)
  - Shirley Fry Irvin, American tennis player (d. 2021)

=== July–August ===
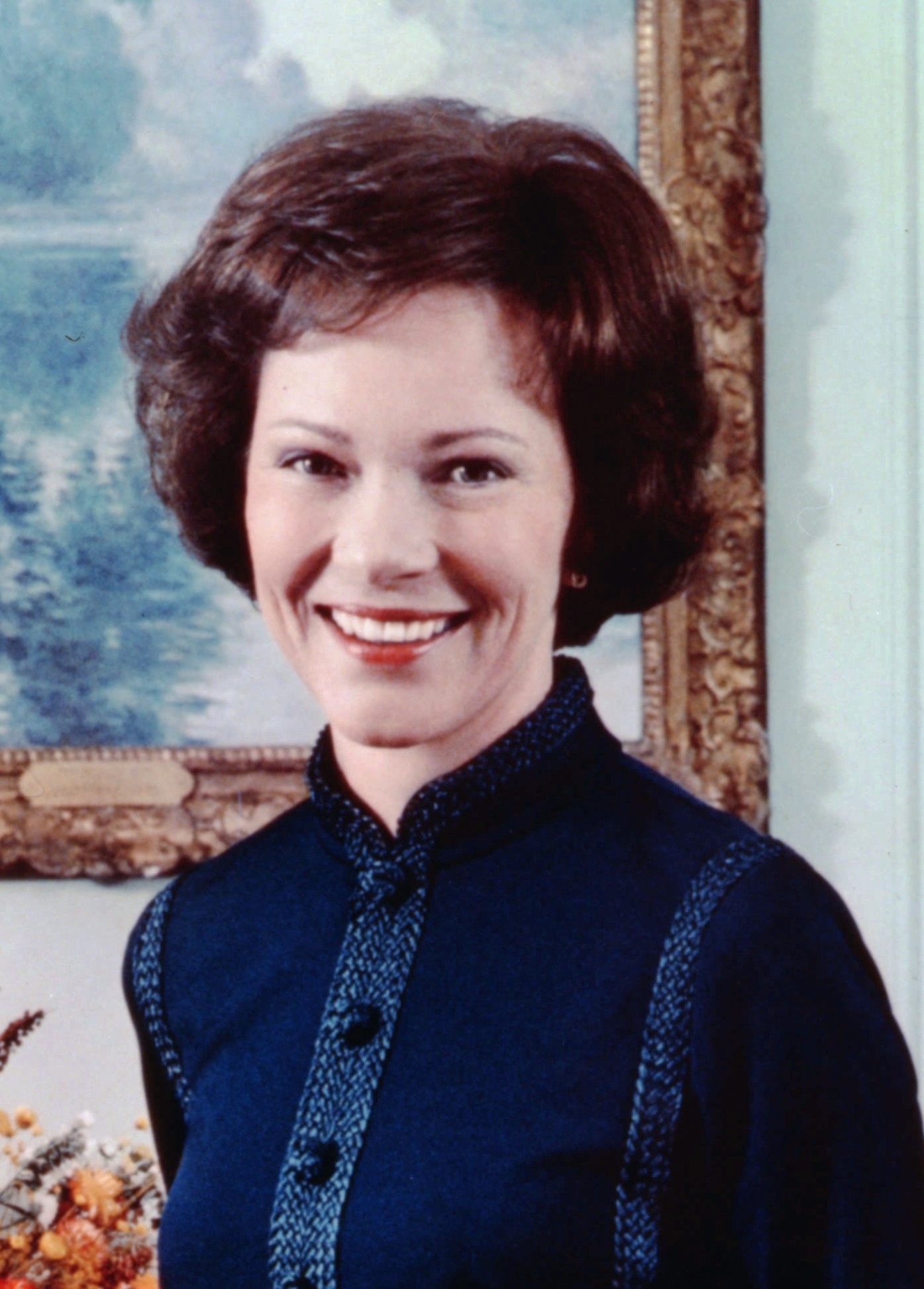
Rosalynn Carter

- July 1
  - Chandra Shekhar, 8th Prime Minister of India (d. 2007)
  - Mirghani Alnasri, Sudanese politician (d. 2010)
  - Leo Klejn, Russian archaeologist, anthropologist and philologist (d. 2019)
- July 3 – Salome Þorkelsdóttir, Icelandic politician
- July 4
  - Gina Lollobrigida, Italian actress (d. 2023)
  - Neil Simon, American playwright, screenwriter and author (d. 2018)
- July 6 – Janet Leigh, American actress (d. 2004)
- July 7 – Carl "Doc" Severinsen, American jazz trumpeter and bandleader
- July 9 – Red Kelly, Canadian ice hockey player (d. 2019)
- July 10
  - Grigory Barenblatt, Russian mathematician (d. 2018)
  - David Dinkins, African-American Mayor of New York City (1989–93) (d. 2020)
- July 11
  - Theodore H. Maiman, American inventor, physicist who developed the laser (d. 2007)
  - Gregorio Salvador Caja, Spanish linguist (d. 2020)
- July 13 – Simone Veil, French lawyer and politician (d. 2017)
- July 15
  - Håkon Brusveen, Norwegian cross-country skier (d. 2021)
  - Nan Martin, American actress (d. 2010)
  - Carmen Zapata, American actress (d. 2014)
- July 18 – Kurt Masur, German conductor (d. 2015)
- July 21
  - Albert Zwaveling, Dutch Surgeon (d. 2023)
  - Lyudmila Alexeyeva, Russian historian and human rights activist (d. 2018)
  - Michael Gielen, Austrian conductor and composer (d. 2019)
- July 28 – John Ashbery, American poet and critic (d. 2017)
- August 2 – Andreas Dückstein, Austrian chess player (d. 2024)
- August 6
  - Arturo Armando Molina, President of El Salvador (d. 2021)
  - Theodor Wagner, Austrian footballer and manager (d. 2020)
- August 7 – Dušan Čkrebić, Serbian politician, President 1984–86 (d. 2022)
- August 8 – Giuseppe Moioli, Italian rower (d. 2025)
- August 9
  - Marvin Minsky, American computer scientist, Turing Award winner (Artificial intelligence) (d. 2016)
  - Robert Shaw, British actor (d. 1978)
- August 13 – David Padilla, 53rd President of Bolivia (d. 2016)
- August 16 – Ann Blyth, American actress (d. 2026)
- August 18 – Rosalynn Carter, First Lady of the United States (d. 2023)
- August 19 – Hsing Yun, Chinese Buddhist monk (d. 2023)
- August 21 – Thomas S. Monson, 16th president of the Church of Jesus Christ of Latter-day Saints (d. 2018)
- August 23
  - Dick Bruna, Dutch artist, graphic designer (d. 2017)
  - Philippe Mestre, French high-ranking civil servant, media executive and politician (d. 2017)
- August 24 – Harry Markowitz, American economist (d. 2023)
- August 25 – Althea Gibson, African-American tennis player (d. 2003)
- August 26
  - Jill Amos, New Zealand politician and community leader (d. 2017)
  - B. V. Doshi, Indian architect (d. 2023)

=== September–October ===
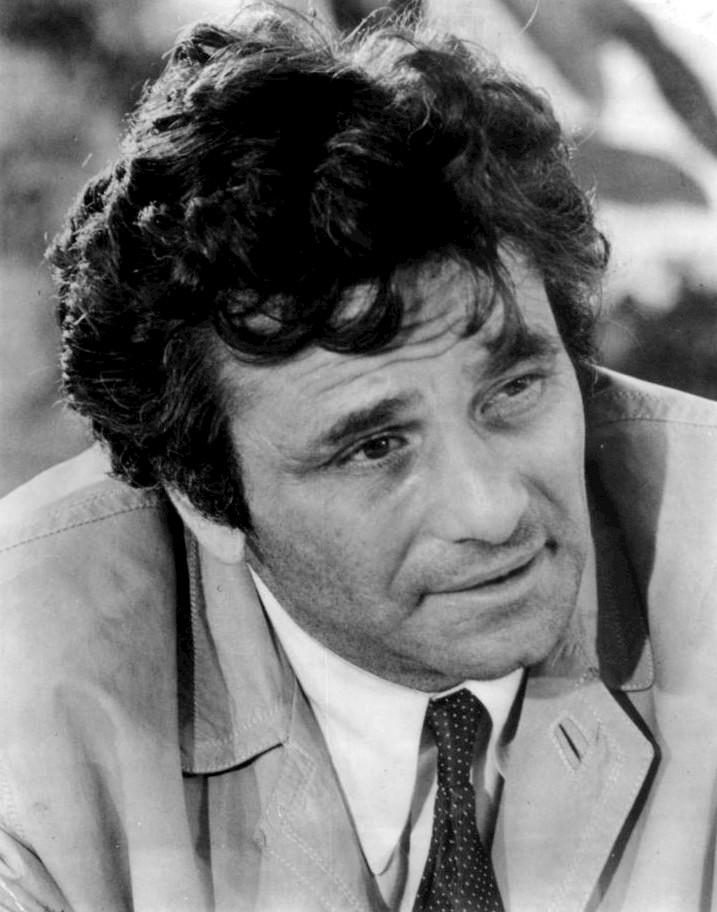
Peter Falk

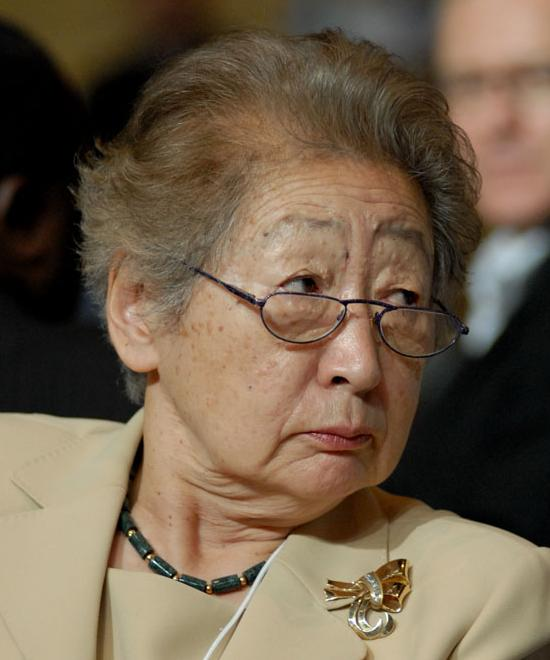
Sadako Ogata

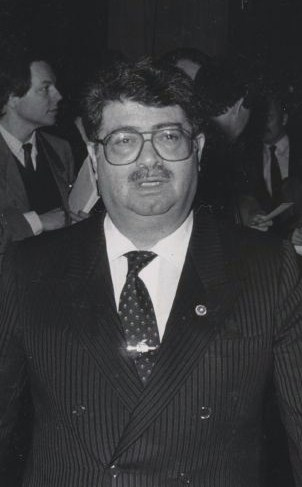
Turgut Özal

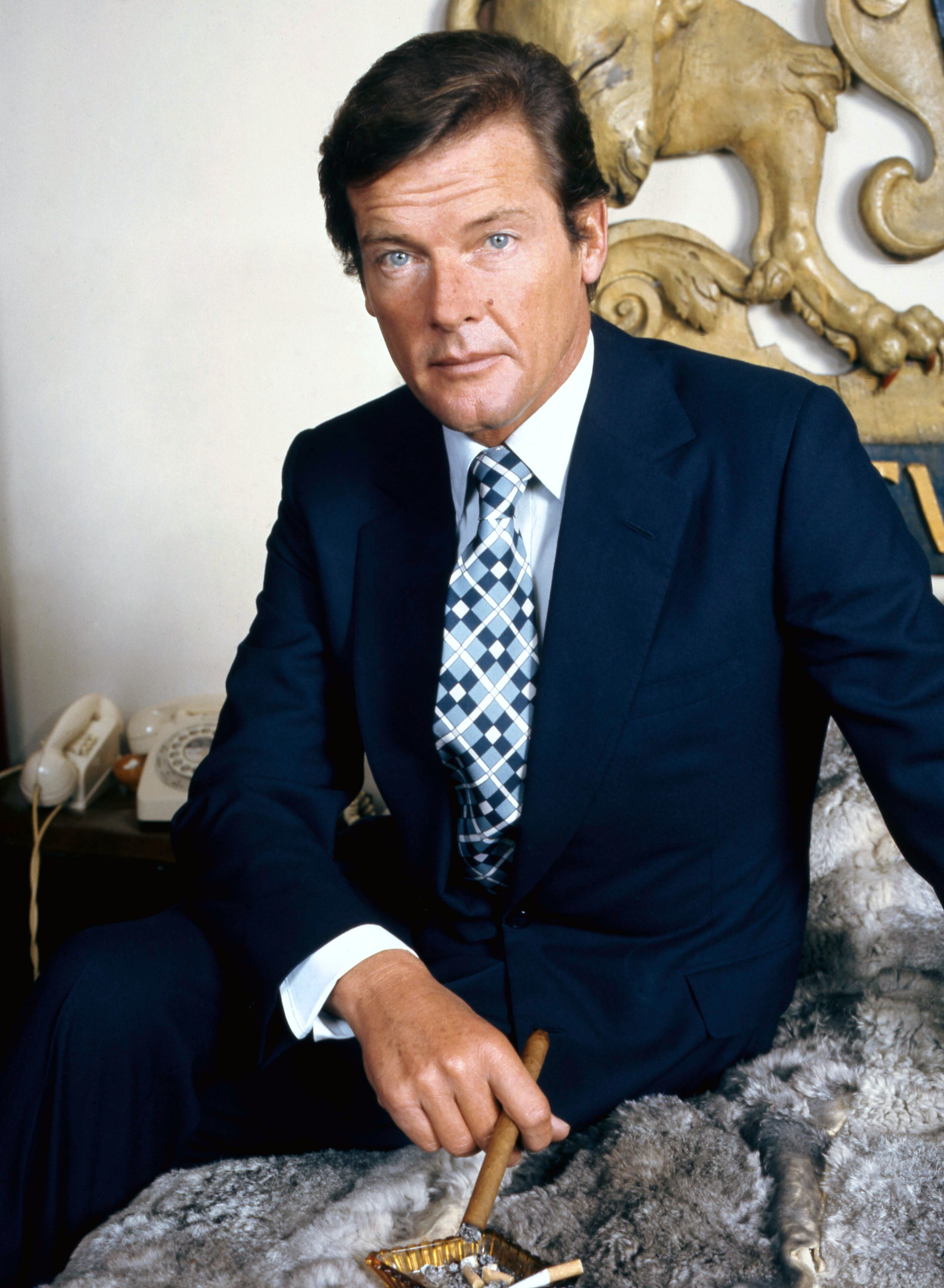
Sir Roger Moore

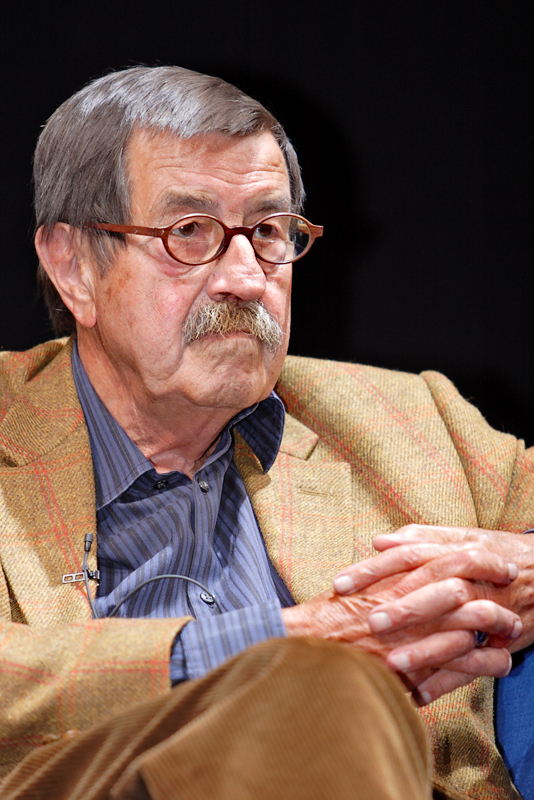
Günter Grass

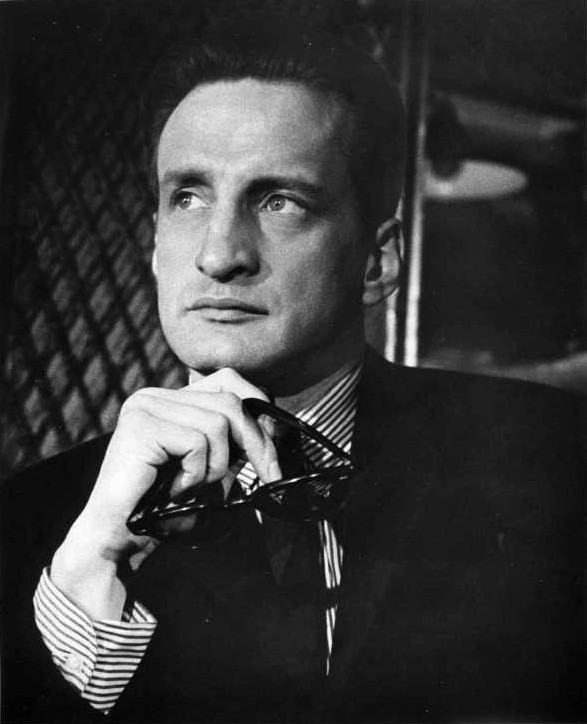
George C. Scott

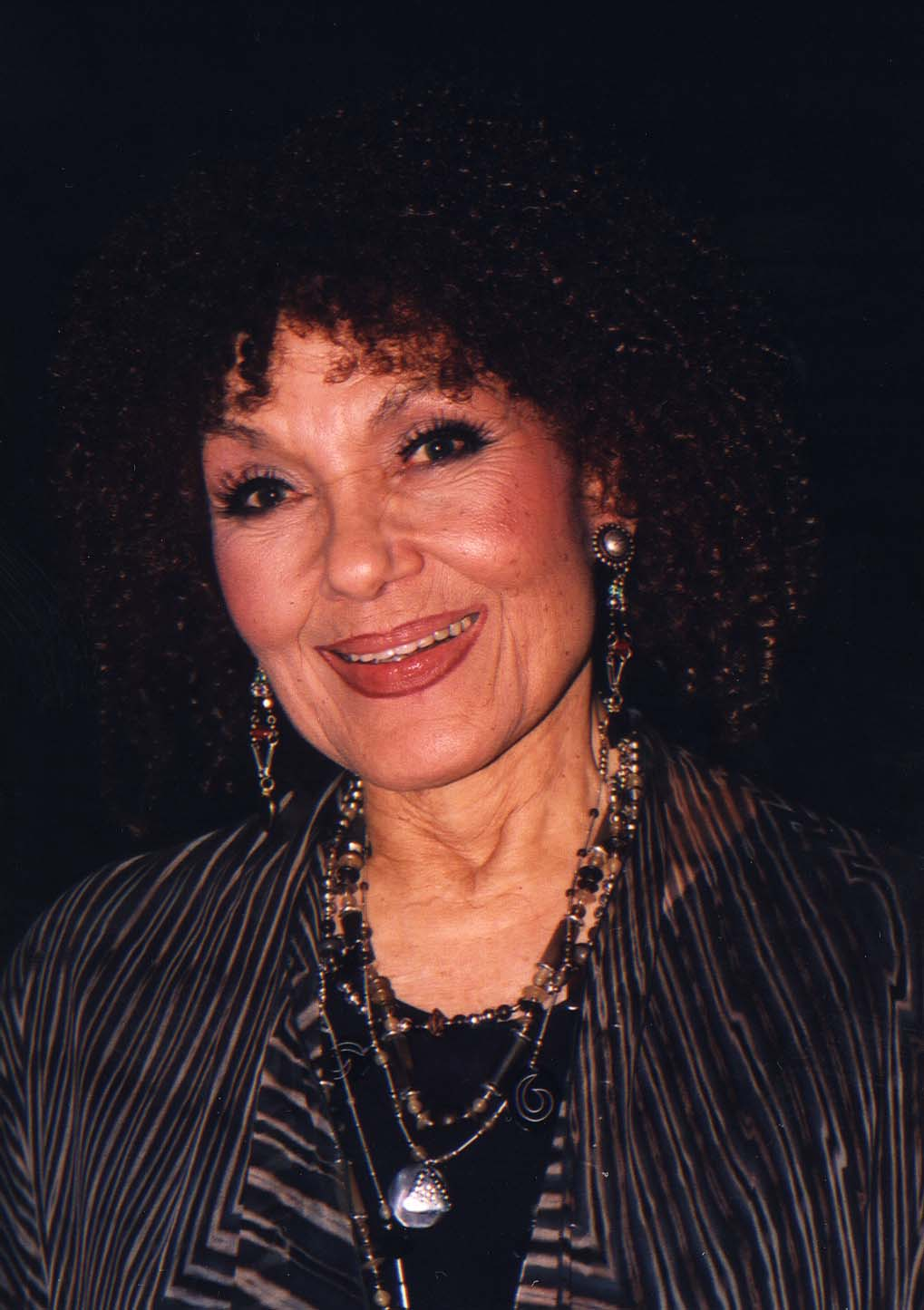
Cleo Laine

- September 2 – Trude Beiser, Austrian alpine skier
- September 5 – Paul Volcker, American economist, academic (d. 2019)
- September 8 – Marguerite Frank, American-French mathematician (d. 2024)
- September 10 – Sachiko, Princess Hisa, Japanese princess (d. 1928)
- September 12 – Freddie Jones, English actor (d. 2019)
- September 13 – Laura Cardoso, Brazilian actress (d. 2026)
- September 15 – Margaret Keane, American artist (d. 2022)
- September 16
  - Peter Falk, American actor (d. 2011)
  - Sadako Ogata, Japanese diplomat, United Nations High Commissioner for Refugees (d. 2019)
- September 19
  - Harold Brown, American nuclear physicist, 14th United States Secretary of Defense (d. 2019)
  - Rosemary Harris, English actress
- September 23 – Abdel Khaliq Mahjub, Sudanese politician (d. 1971)
- September 25 – Sir Colin Davis, English conductor (d. 2013)
- September 29
  - Josefina Echánove, Mexican actress, model and journalist (d. 2020)
  - Adhemar Ferreira da Silva, Brazilian athlete (d. 2001)
- September 30 – W. S. Merwin, American poet (d. 2019)
- October 1
  - Tom Bosley, American actor (d. 2010)
  - Márta Kurtág, Hungarian classical pianist (d. 2019)
- October 4 – Margaret Varner Bloss, American athlete
- October 6 – Paul Badura-Skoda, Austrian pianist (d. 2019)
- October 7 – Al Martino, American singer, actor (d. 2009)
- October 8 – César Milstein, Argentine scientist, Nobel Prize in Physiology or Medicine recipient (d. 2002)
- October 11
  - Princess Joséphine Charlotte of Belgium, Grand Duchess of Luxembourg (d. 2005)
  - William Perry, American mathematician, engineer and businessman
- October 13
  - Lee Konitz, American jazz composer, alto saxophonist (d. 2020)
  - Turgut Özal, 8th President, 26th Prime Minister of Turkey (d. 1993)
- October 14 – Sir Roger Moore, English actor (d. 2017)
- October 16 – Günter Grass, German writer, Nobel Prize laureate (d. 2015)
- October 18 – George C. Scott, American actor (Patton) (d. 1999)
- October 22 – Oscar Furlong, Argentine basketball player, and tennis player and coach (d. 2018)
- October 23 – Leszek Kołakowski, Polish philosopher (d. 2009)
- October 25
  - Jorge Batlle, President of Uruguay (d. 2016)
  - Barbara Cook, American singer and actress (d. 2017)
  - Bud Held, American athlete
- October 27 – Dominick Argento, American composer and educator (d. 2019)
- October 28
  - Dame Cleo Laine, English jazz singer and actress (d. 2025)
  - Roza Makagonova, Russian actress (d. 1995)
- October 29 – Frank Sedgman, Australian tennis player

=== November–December ===
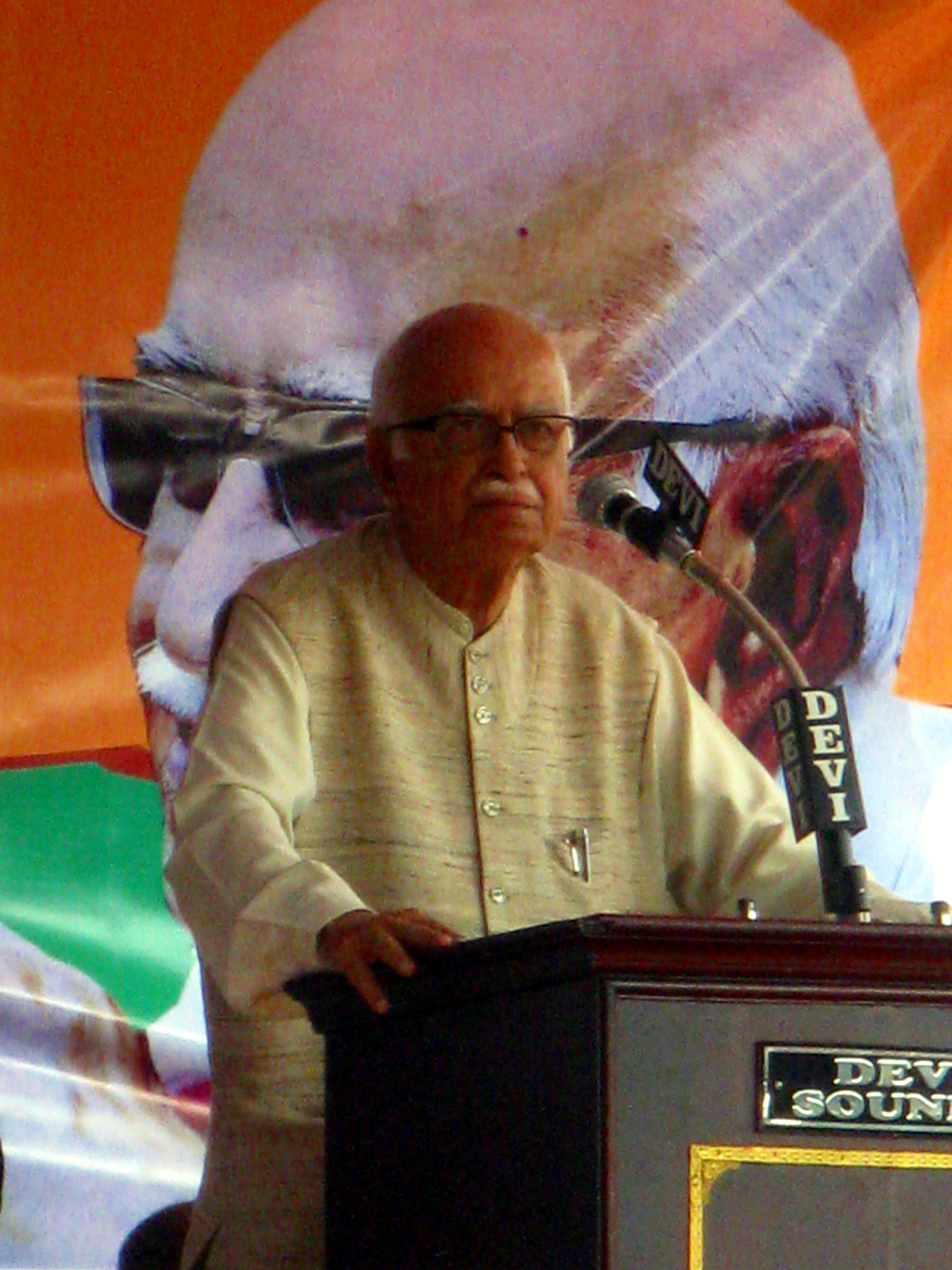
L. K. Advani

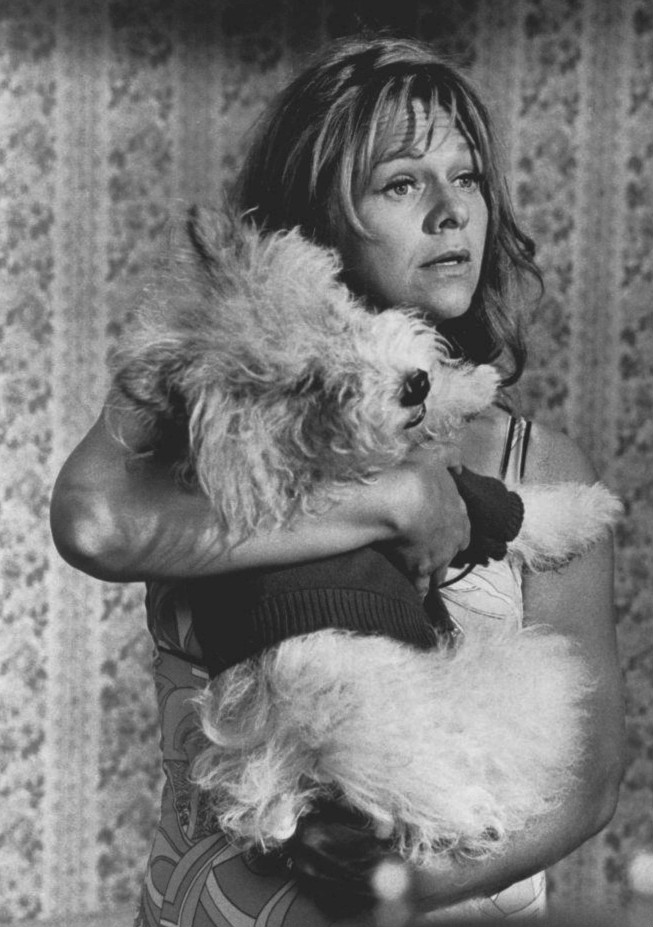
Estelle Parsons

- November 2 – Steve Ditko, American comic-book writer and artist (d. 2018)
- November 3
  - Marius Barnard, South African cardiac surgeon (d. 2014)
  - Odvar Nordli, Norwegian politician and 10th Prime Minister of Norway (d. 2018)
- November 7 – Hiroshi Yamauchi, Japanese businessman, president of Nintendo (d. 2013)
- November 8
  - L. K. Advani, Indian lawyer and politician
  - Patti Page, American pop singer (d. 2013)
- November 14
  - George Bizos, Greek-born human rights lawyer (d. 2020)
  - McLean Stevenson, American actor (M*A*S*H, Hello, Larry) (d. 1996)
- November 15 – Bill Rowling, 30th Prime Minister of New Zealand (d. 1995)
- November 18 – Hank Ballard, American musician (d. 2003)
- November 20 – Estelle Parsons, American actress
- November 23 – Angelo Sodano, Italian Catholic cardinal, Dean of the College of Cardinals (d. 2022)
- November 24 – Alfredo Kraus, Spanish tenor (d. 1999)
- November 28 – Abdul Halim of Kedah, Malaysian sultan, 5th & 14th Yang di-Pertuan Agong (d. 2017)
- November 30 – Robert Guillaume, African-American actor and singer (d. 2017)
- December 3 – Andy Williams, American singer (d. 2012)
- December 5
  - Bhumibol Adulyadej, King Rama IX of Thailand (d. 2016)
  - Óscar Míguez, Uruguayan football player (d. 2006)
  - Erich Probst, Austrian football player (d. 1988)
- December 6 – Marcel Pelletier, Canadian ice hockey player (d. 2017)
- December 8 – Vladimir Shatalov, Russian cosmonaut (d. 2021)
- December 9 – Pierre Henry, French composer (d. 2017)
- December 11 – Stein Eriksen, Norwegian Olympic skier (d. 2015)
- December 12 – Robert Noyce, American co-founder of Intel (d. 1990)
- December 16 – Akihiko Hirata, Japanese actor (d. 1984)
- December 18 – Roméo LeBlanc, 25th Governor General of Canada (d. 2009)
- December 20 – Kim Young-sam, South Korean politician, 7th President of the Republic of Korea (d. 2015)
- December 24 – Mary Higgins Clark, American novelist (d. 2020)
- December 25 – Ram Narayan, Indian sarangi player (d. 2024)
- December 28 – Edward Babiuch, Polish Communist politician (d. 2021)
- December 29 – Andy Stanfield, American athlete (d. 1985)
- December 30
  - Robert Hossein, French film director and actor (d. 2020)
  - Hamed Karoui, 16th Prime Minister of Tunisia (d. 2020)

== Deaths ==
=== January–February ===
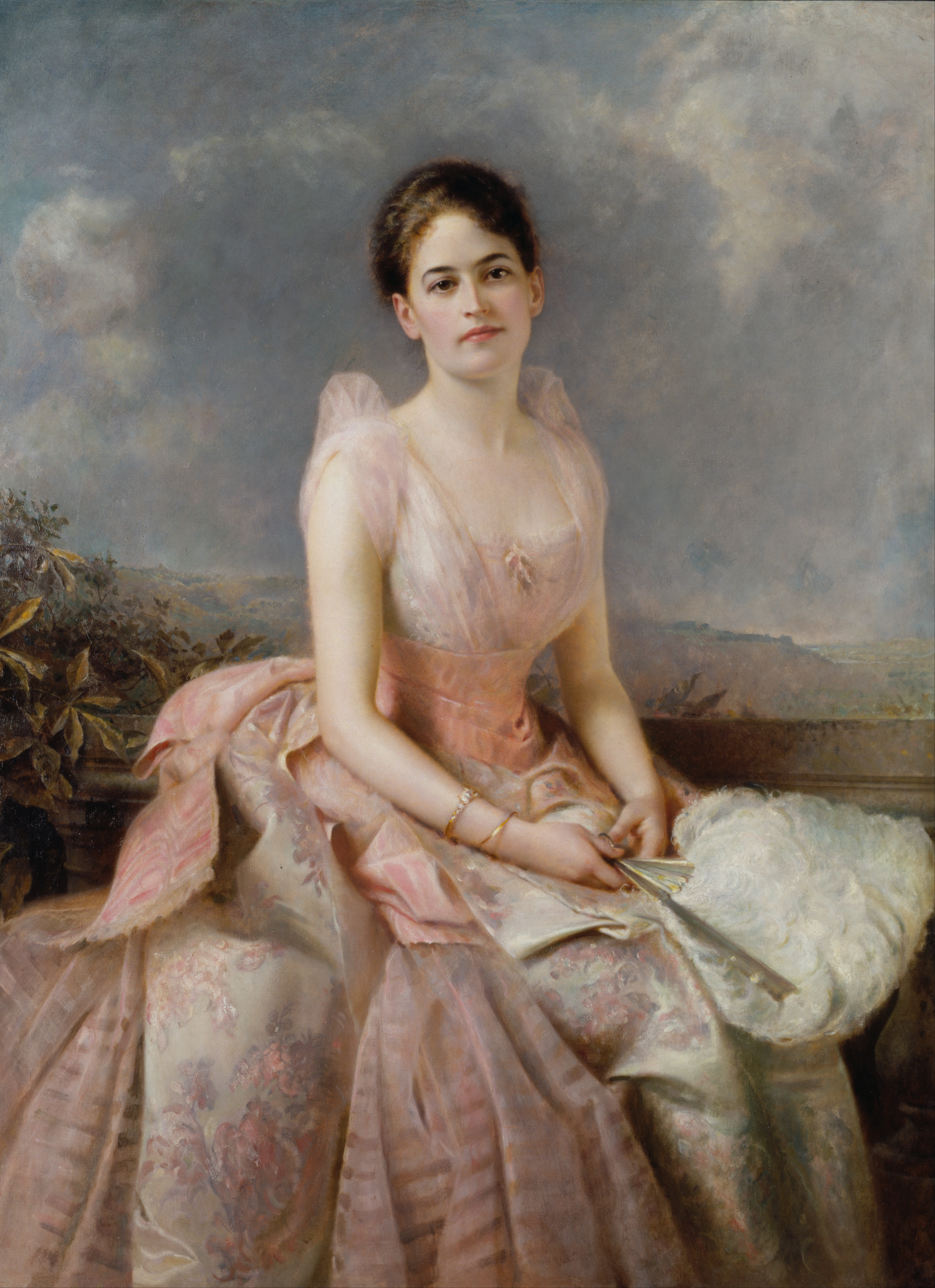
Juliette Gordon Low

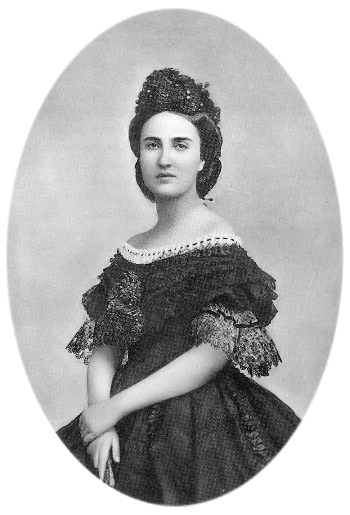
Carlota of Mexico

Blessed Jurgis Matulaitis-Matulevičius

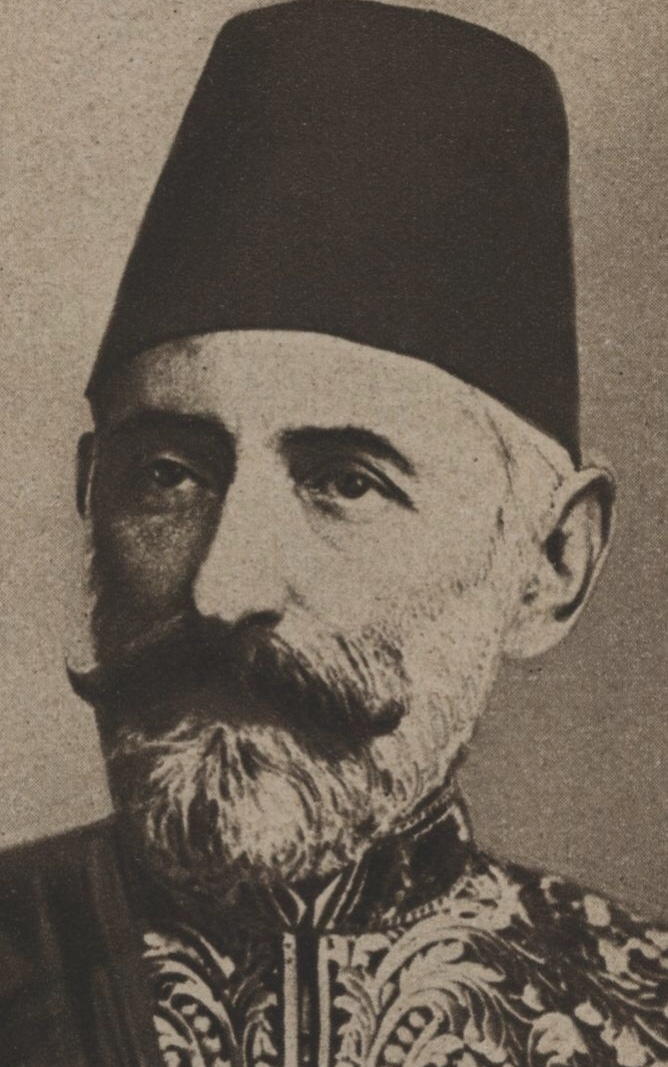
Turhan Përmeti

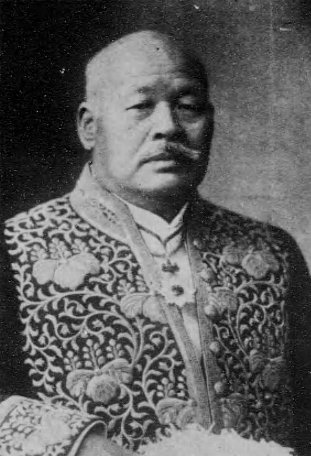
Noda Utarō

- January 4 – Süleyman Nazif, Turkish poet (b. 1870)
- January 9 – Houston Stewart Chamberlain, English-born German author (b. 1855)
- January 16 – Jovan Cvijić, Serbian geographer (b. 1865)
- January 17 – Juliette Gordon Low, founder of the Girl Scouts USA (b. 1860)
- January 19
  - Empress Carlota of Mexico (b. 1840)
  - Carl Gräbe, German chemist (b. 1841)
- January 27 – Jurgis Matulaitis-Matulevičius, Lithuanian Roman Catholic bishop and blessed (b. 1871)
- January 30
  - Friedrich Koch, German composer (b. 1862)
  - Ferdinando Russo, Italian journalist (b. 1866)
- February 4 – Janko Vukotić, Montenegrin general (b. 1866)
- February 6 – Mateo Correa Magallanes, Mexican Roman Catholic priest, martyr and saint (b. 1866)
- February 9 – Charles Doolittle Walcott, American paleontologist (b. 1850)
- February 10 – Laura Netzel, Swedish composer and conductor (b. 1839)
- February 16
  - Jonas Basanavičius, Lithuanian-Soviet activist (b. 1851)
  - Friedrich Reinitzer, Austrian botanist (b. 1857)
- February 18
  - Turhan Pasha Përmeti, Albanian politician, 3rd Prime Minister of Albania, leader of the World War I (b. 1846)
  - Abd-al Karim, Afghan emir (b. 1897)
- February 19
  - Georg Brandes, Danish critic and scholar (b. 1842)
  - Fernand de Langle de Cary, French general (b. 1849)
  - Robert Fuchs (composer), Austrian composer (b. 1847)
- February 23 – Noda Utarō, Japanese entrepreneur and politician (b. 1853)
- February 25 – Kōgyo Tsukioka, Japanese artist (b. 1869)
- February 26
  - Austin M. Knight, American admiral (b. 1854)
  - Hermann Obrist, German sculptor (b. 1862)

=== March–April ===
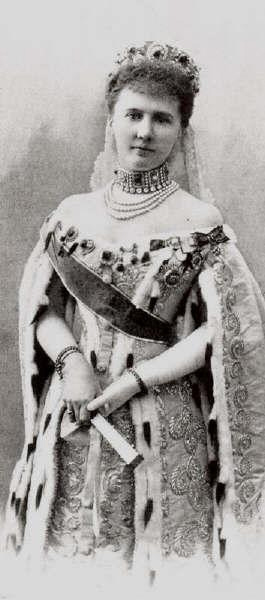
Elisabeth of Saxe-Altenburg

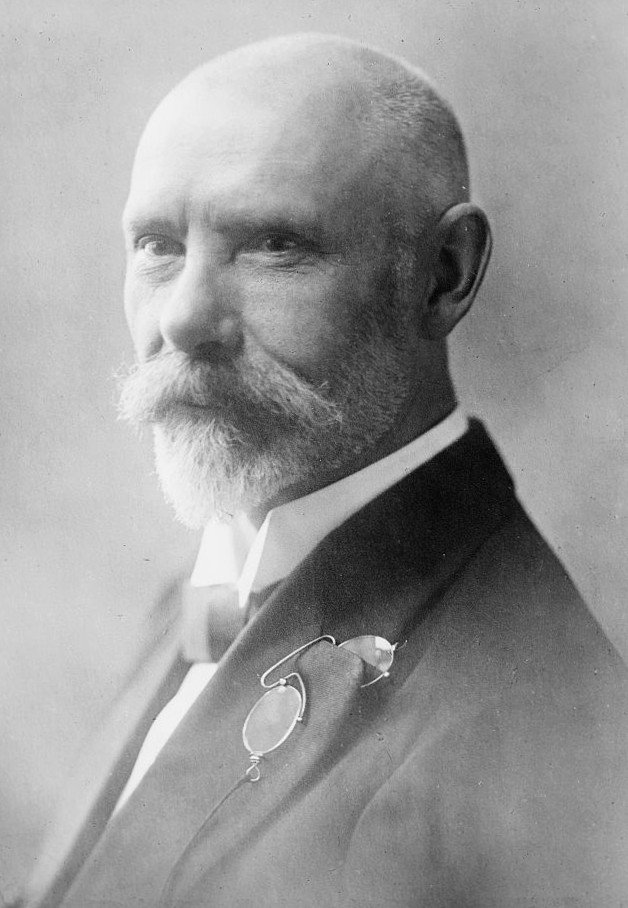
Jānis Čakste

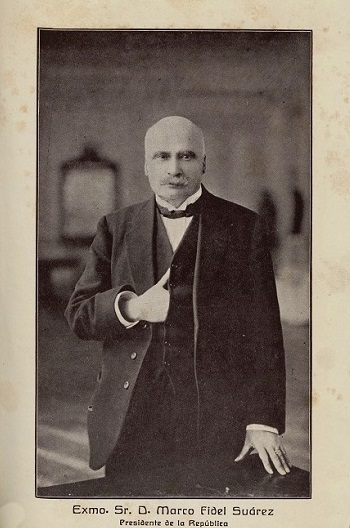
Marco Fidel Suárez

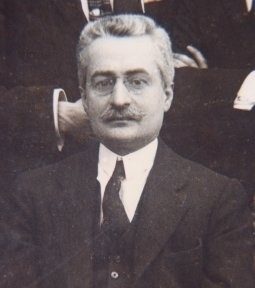
Saint Giuseppe Moscati

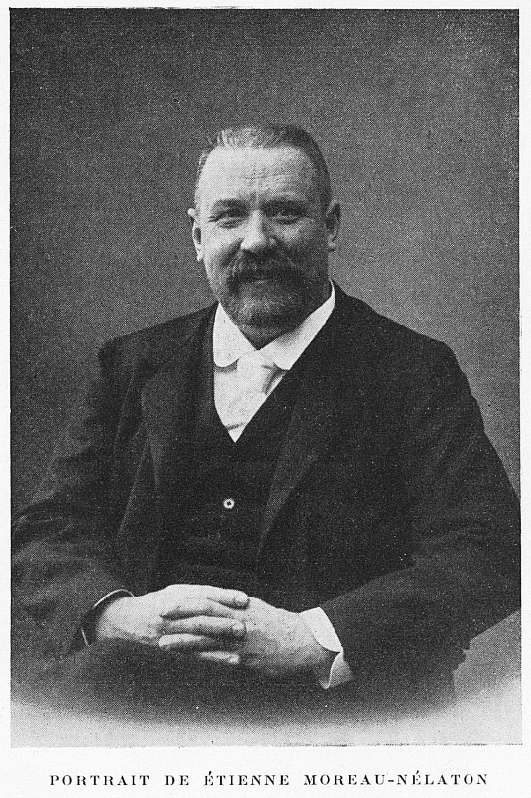
Étienne Moreau-Nélaton

- March 1 – Nakamura Yoshikoto, Japanese politician, Mayor of Tokyo (b. 1867)
- March 3 – Mikhail Artsybashev, Russian writer (b. 1878)
- March 4 – Ira Remsen, American chemist, discoverer of saccharin (b. 1846)
- March 6 – Marie Spartali Stillman, British painter (b. 1844)
- March 8 – Manuel Gondra, Paraguayan author and journalist, 21st President of Paraguay (b. 1871)
- March 9 – Lucrecia Arana, Spanish opera singer (b. 1871)
- March 11 – Xenophon Stratigos, Greek general (b. 1869)
- March 14 – Jānis Čakste, Latvian politician, 1st President of Latvia (b. 1859)
- March 16 – Marie Magdeleine Real del Sarte, French painter (b. 1853)
- March 22 – Templin Potts, American naval officer; 11th Naval Governor of Guam (b. 1855)
- March 23
  - Dietrich Barfurth, German anatomist and embryologist (b. 1849)
  - Paul César Helleu, French artist (b. 1859)
- March 24 – Princess Elisabeth of Saxe-Altenburg (b. 1865)
- March 25 – Marie-Alphonsine Danil Ghattas, Palestinian Roman Catholic nun and saint (b. 1843)
- March 27
  - Alexandru Bădărău, Romanian journalist (b. 1859)
  - William Healey Dall, American malacologist and explorer (b. 1845)
- March 29
  - Patriarch Ambrosius of Georgia (b. 1861)
  - Luigi Luzzatti, Italian economist, financier, jurist and philosopher, 20th Prime Minister of Italy (b. 1841)
- April 1 – Anacleto González Flores, Mexican Roman Catholic layman and blessed (b. 1888)
- April 3 – Marco Fidel Suárez, Colombian political figure, 9th President of Colombia (b. 1855)
- April 4 – Albert Van Coile, Belgian footballer (b. 1900)
- April 7 – Domingo Iturrate Zubero, Spanish Roman Catholic priest and blessed (b. 1901)
- April 12 – Giuseppe Moscati, Italian doctor, researcher, professor and Roman Catholic saint (b. 1880)
- April 15 – Gaston Leroux, French journalist and author (b. 1868)
- April 20 – Enrique Simonet, Spanish painter (b. 1866)
- April 25 – Étienne Moreau-Nélaton, French painter (b. 1859)
- April 28
  - M. P. Bajana, Indian cricketer (b. 1886)
  - Li Dazhao, Chinese intellectual, co-founder of the Chinese Communist Party (executed) (b. 1888)
- April 29 – Juan Ángel Arias Boquín, 16th President of Honduras (b. 1859)
- April 30 – Friedrich von Scholtz, German general (b. 1851)

=== May–June ===
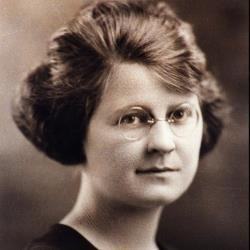
Blessed Teresa Demjanovich

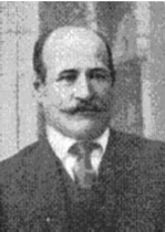
Nikifor Begichev

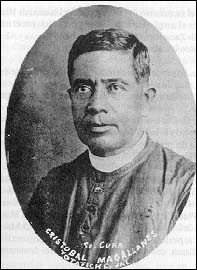
Saint Cristóbal Magallanes Jara

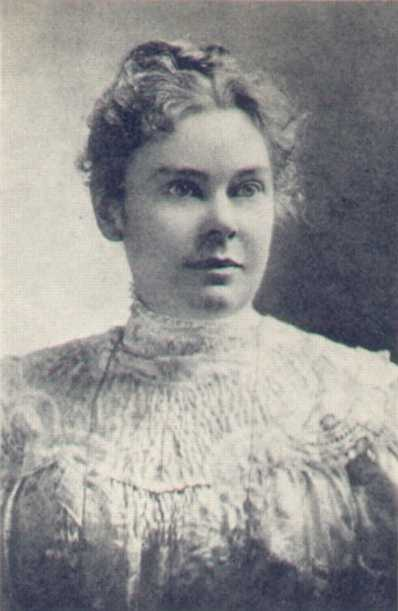
Lizzie Borden

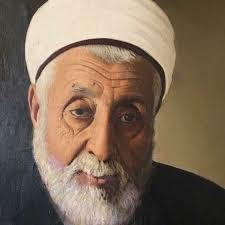
Abd Al-Rahman Al-Gillani

- May 2 – Ernest Starling, English physiologist (b. 1866)
- May 5 – Ana Echazarreta, First Lady of Chile (b. 1864)
- May 8
  - Charles Nungesser, French aviator, World War I fighter ace (date of disappearance) (b. 1892)
  - Francois Coli, French aerial navigator, WW1 veteran (date of disappearance) (b. 1882)
  - Teresa Demjanovich, American Catholic religious sister and blessed (b. 1901)
- May 11 – Juan Gris, Spanish sculptor, painter (b. 1887)
- May 12 – Giuseppe Bagnera, Italian mathematician (b. 1865)
- May 13 – Heinrich Peer, Austrian film actor (b. 1867)
- May 17 – Harold Geiger, American aviator (b. 1884)
- May 20 – John J. O'Connor, American Roman Catholic bishop and reverend (b. 1855)
- May 23 – Henry E. Huntington, American railroad magnate (b. 1850)
- May 25
  - Agustín Caloca Cortés, Mexican Roman Catholic layman and martyr (killed in action) (b. 1898)
  - Henri Hubert, French archaeologist, sociologist (b. 1872)
  - Cristóbal Magallanes Jara, Mexican Roman Catholic priest, martyr and saint (killed in battle) (b. 1869)
- May 28 – Boris Kustodiev, Soviet painter and designer (b. 1878)
- June 1
  - Lizzie Borden, American woman accused and acquitted of parricide (b. 1860)
  - J. B. Bury, Irish historian (b. 1861)
  - Annibale Maria di Francia, Italian Roman Catholic priest and saint (b. 1851)
- June 3 – Princess Clotilde of Saxe-Coburg and Gotha (b. 1846)
- June 4
  - Julia Hurley, American actress (b. 1848)
  - Robert McKim, American actor (b. 1886)
- June 6 – Robert C. Hilliard, American stage actor (b. 1857)
- June 7
  - František Dvořák, Czechoslovak painter (b. 1862)
  - José Pedro Montero, 27th President of Paraguay (b. 1878)
  - Pyotr Voykov, Bolshevik revolutionary and Soviet diplomat (assassinated) (b. 1888)
- June 9
  - Adolfo León Gómez, Colombian politician (b. 1857)
  - Victoria Woodhull, American feminist, spiritualist and first woman to ever run for U.S. President (b. 1838)
- June 13
  - Abd Al-Rahman Al-Gillani, Iraqi politician, 1st Prime Minister of Iraq (b. 1841)
  - Giuseppe Primoli, Italian collector and photographer (b. 1851)
- June 14 – Jerome K. Jerome, English writer (b. 1859)
- June 15 – Dashi-Dorzho Itigilov, Chinese Buddhist leader (b. 1852)
- June 20 – Clara Louise Burnham, American novelist (b. 1854)
- June 24 – Johann Büttikofer, Swiss zoologist (b. 1850)
- June 26
  - Armand Guillaumin, French painter and lithographer (b. 1841)
  - José María Robles Hurtado, Mexican Roman Catholic priest, martyr and saint (b. 1888)
- June 27 – Sir James Macdonald, Scottish engineer and explorer (b. 1862)
- June 28 – Rafaél Manuel Almansa Riaño, Colombian Roman Catholic priest and venerable (b. 1840)
- June 29 – Ida Gerhardi, German painter (b. 1862)

=== July–August ===
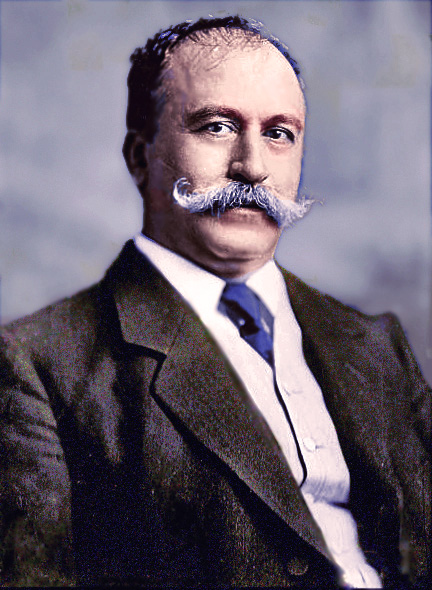
Pedro Nel Ospina Vázquez

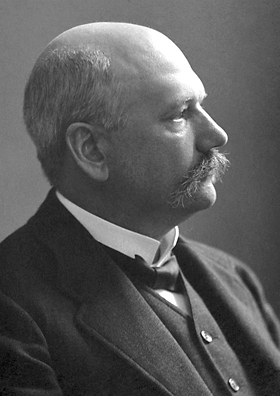
Albrecht Kossel

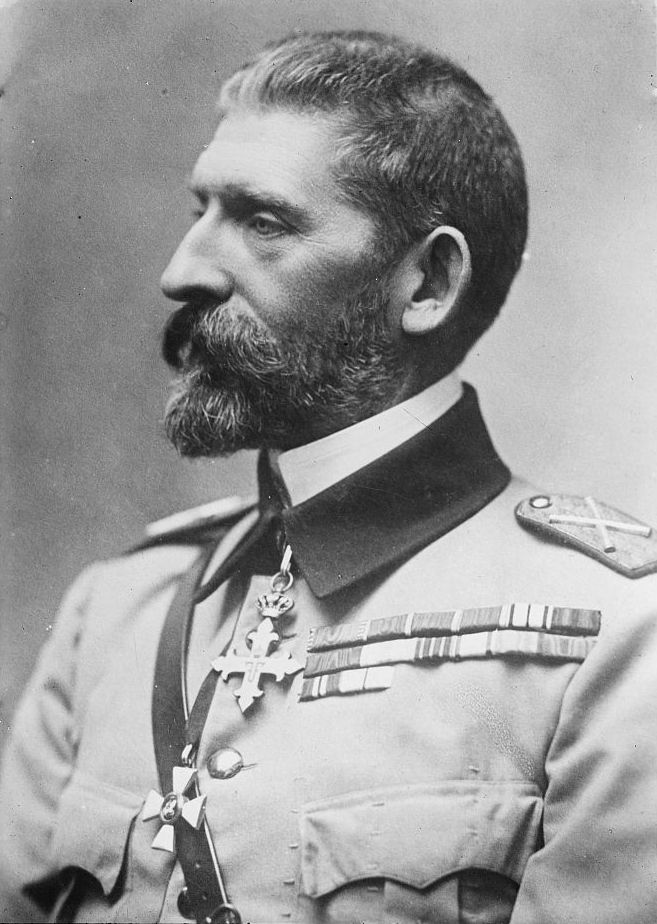
King Ferdinand of Romania

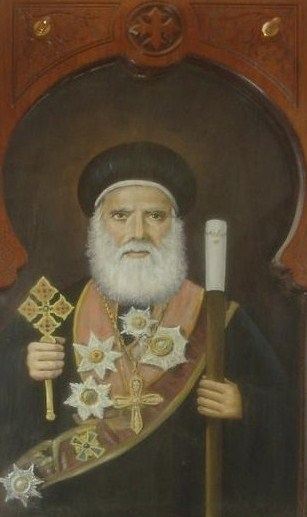
Pope Cyril V of Alexandria

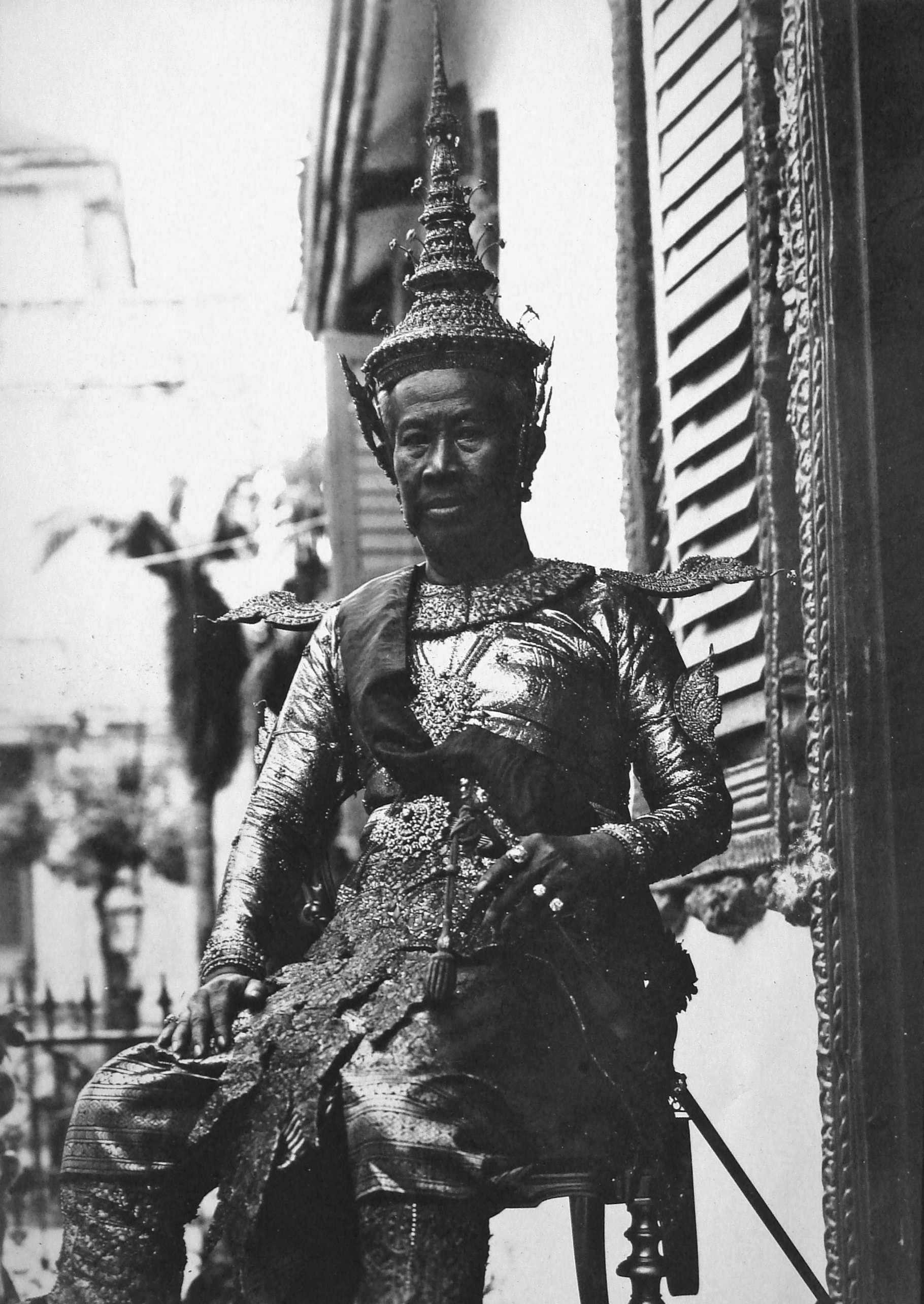
King Sisowath of Cambodia

- July 1 – Pedro Nel Ospina Vázquez, Colombian general and political figure, 11th President of Colombia (b. 1858)
- July 2 – Joseph Gaudentius Anderson, American Roman Catholic bishop (b. 1869)
- July 5 – Albrecht Kossel, German physician, recipient of the Nobel Prize in Physiology or Medicine (b. 1853)
- July 6
  - Prince Friedrich Sigismund of Prussia (b. 1891)
  - Frederick Van Voorhies Holman, American lawyer (b. 1852)
- July 8 – Max Hoffmann, German general (b. 1869)
- July 9 – John Drew Jr., American stage actor (b. 1853)
- July 11 – Ottavio Cagiano de Azevedo, Italian Roman Catholic cardinal (b. 1845)
- July 12 – Thomas F. Porter, American politician, 32nd Mayor of Lynn, Massachusetts (b. 1847)
- July 13 – Otto Blehr, Norwegian editor and politician, 7th Prime Minister of Norway (b. 1847)
- July 15 – Constance Markievicz, Irish politician (b. 1868)
- July 20 – King Ferdinand I of Romania (b. 1865)
- July 23 – Reginald Dyer, British army officer, perpetrator of Jallianwala Bagh massacre (b. 1864)
- July 24 – Ryūnosuke Akutagawa, Japanese poet and writer (b. 1892)
- July 25 – Joseph Adélard Descarries, French-born Canadian lawyer (b. 1853)
- July 26
  - Federico De Roberto, Italian novelist (b. 1861)
  - June Mathis, American screenwriter (b. 1889)
- July 27 – Charles Fuller Baker, American botanist (b. 1872)
- July 29 – Louise Abbéma, French painter, sculptor and designer of the Belle Époque (b. 1853)
- July 30 – James Emman Kwegyir Aggrey, Ghanaian-born educationalist (b. 1875)
- July 31 – Sir Harry Johnston, British explorer and colonial administrator (b. 1858)
- August 3 – Edward B. Titchener, English psychologist (b. 1867)
- August 4 – Ġużè Muscat Azzopardi, Maltese lawyer, poet and novelist (b. 1853)
- August 7
  - Pope Cyril V of Alexandria (b. 1831)
  - Leonard Wood, American general (b. 1860)
- August 9 – King Sisowath of Cambodia (b. 1840)
- August 13 – James Oliver Curwood, American writer and conservationist (b. 1878)
- August 17
  - Johannes Theodor Baargeld, German painter and poet (b. 1892)
  - Sir Ernest Hatch, British politician (b. 1859)
- August 22 – Louis Agassiz Fuertes, American ornithologist (b. 1874)
- August 23
  - Nicola Sacco, Italian anarchist (b. 1891) (executed)
  - Bartolomeo Vanzetti, Italian anarchist (b. 1888) (executed)
- August 24 – Manuel Díaz Rodríguez, Venezuelan writer (b. 1871)
- August 25 – Elizabeth Maria Molteno, South African activist (b. 1852)
- August 28 – Émile Haug, French geologist and paleontologist (b. 1861)

=== September–October ===
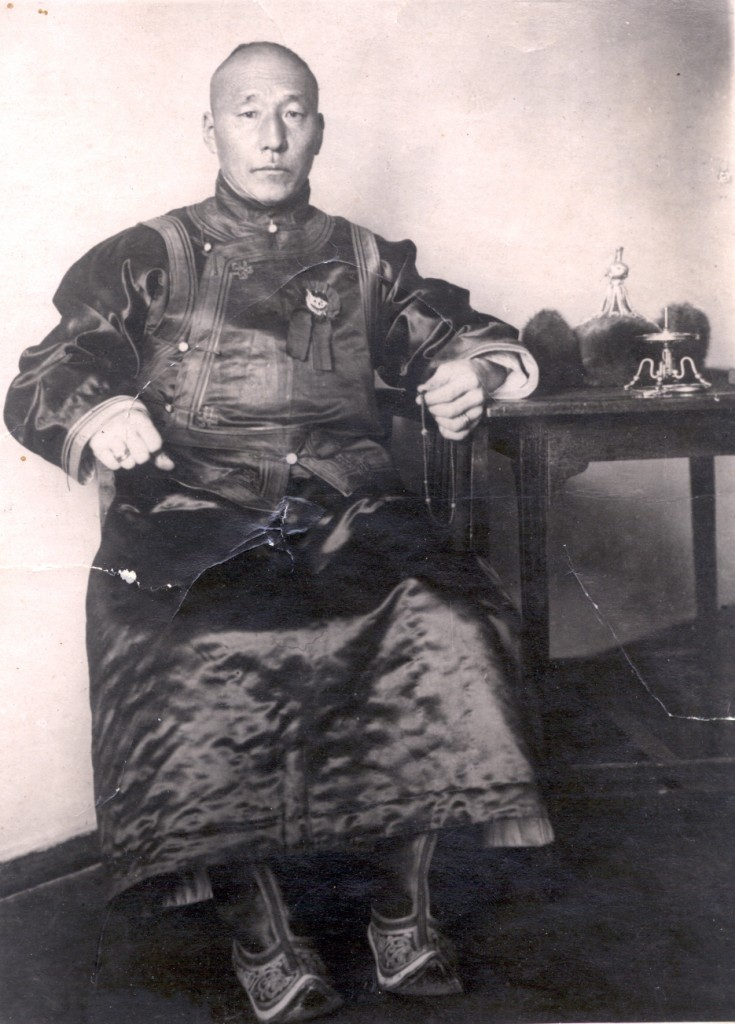
Khatanbaatar Magsarjav

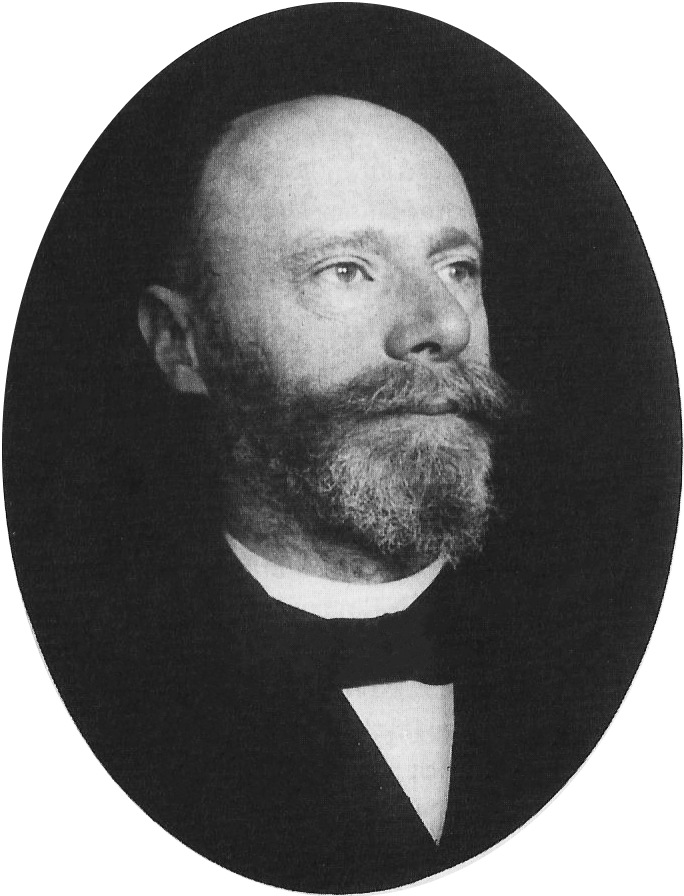
Willem Einthoven

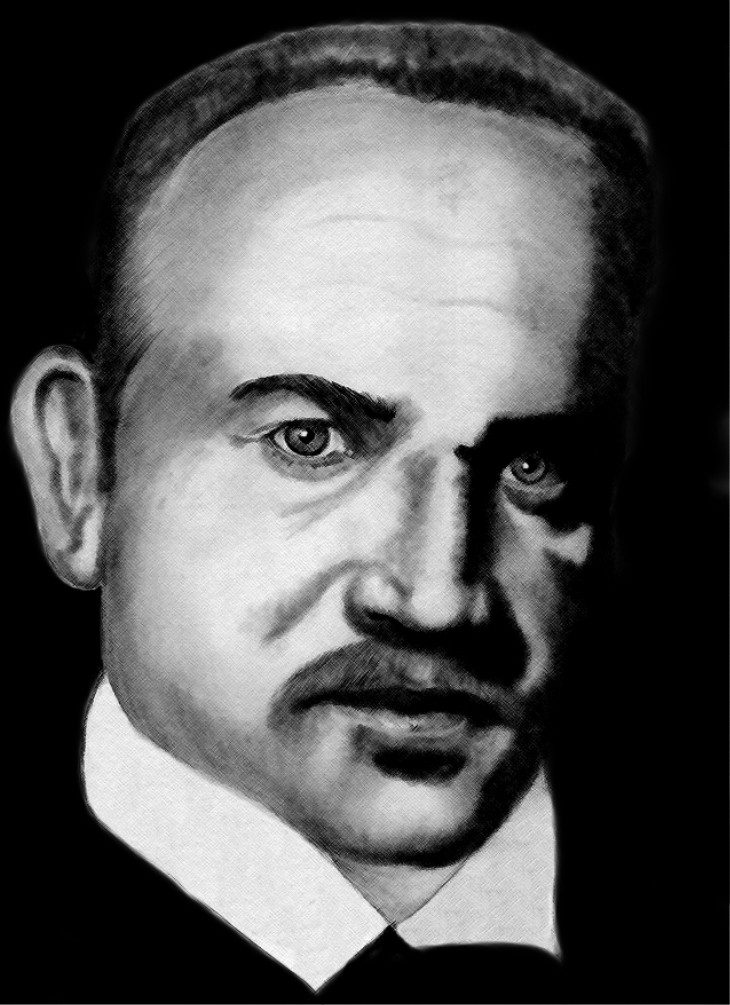
Miguel R. Dávila

- September 1
  - Amelia Bingham, American stage actress (b. 1869)
  - Emil Müller, Austrian mathematician (b. 1861)
- September 2 – Aleksei Aleksandrovich Bobrinsky, Soviet historian and politician (b. 1852)
- September 3 – Khatanbaatar Magsarjav, Mongolian general (b. 1877)
- September 5
  - Marcus Loew, American theatre chain founder (b. 1870)
  - Wayne Wheeler, American temperance movement leader (b. 1869)
- September 10 – Winfield Scott Edgerly, American army officer (b. 1846)
- September 11 – Paola Renata Carboni, Italian Roman Catholic nun and venerable (b. 1908)
- September 14
  - Hugo Ball, German poet, founder of Dadaism (b. 1886)
  - Isadora Duncan, British-born American dancer (b. 1877)
  - Countess Sophie of Merenberg (b. 1868)
- September 17 – Eugene Lamb Richards, American football player (b. 1863)
- September 19 – Michael Ancher, Danish painter (b. 1849)
- September 22 – Édouard Kirmisson, French surgeon (b. 1848)
- September 23 – Iustin Frățiman, Romanian historian and activist (b. 1870)
- September 27 – Mary Canfield Ballard, American poet (b. 1852)
- September 29
  - Willem Einthoven, Dutch inventor, recipient of the Nobel Prize in Physiology or Medicine (b. 1860)
  - August von Heeringen, Prussian admiral (b. 1855)
- September 30 – Samuel Garman, American naturalist and zoologist (b. 1843)
- October 2
  - Svante Arrhenius, Swedish chemist, Nobel Prize laureate (b. 1859)
  - John Dalzell, U.S. Representative from Pennsylvania (b. 1845)
  - Foqion Postoli, Albanian novelist and playwright (b. 1889)
- October 5 – Sam Warner, American Hollywood studio executive (b. 1887)
- October 7 – Edward Guinness, 1st Earl of Iveagh, Irish businessman and philanthropist (b. 1847)
- October 8
  - Ricardo Güiraldes, Argentine novelist and poet (b. 1886)
  - Johann Sahulka, Austrian scientist (b. 1857)
  - Mary Webb, English novelist (b. 1881)
- October 9 – João Marques de Oliveira, Portuguese painter (b. 1853)
- October 10 – Gustave Whitehead, German-born aviation pioneer (b. 1874)
- October 11 – Miguel R. Dávila, Honduranian general, 18th President of Honduras (b. 1856)
- October 13
  - Caroline Brown Buell, American activist (b. 1843)
  - Heinrich XXIV, Prince Reuss of Greiz (b. 1878)
- October 17
  - Harry Jonathan Park, American politician (b. 1868)
  - Thomas Hyland Smeaton, Australian politician and trade unionist (b. 1857)
- October 19 – Beatrice Green, Welsh labour activist (b. 1894)
- October 22
  - Borisav Stanković, Serbian realist writer (b. 1876)
  - Ross Youngs, American baseball player (b. 1897)
- October 27 – Squizzy Taylor, Australian gangster (b. 1888)
- October 29 – Hermann Muthesius, German architect, author and diplomat (b. 1861)
- October 30
  - Maximilian Harden, German editor and journalist (b. 1861)
  - Arthur Nash, American businessman (b. 1870)

=== November–December ===
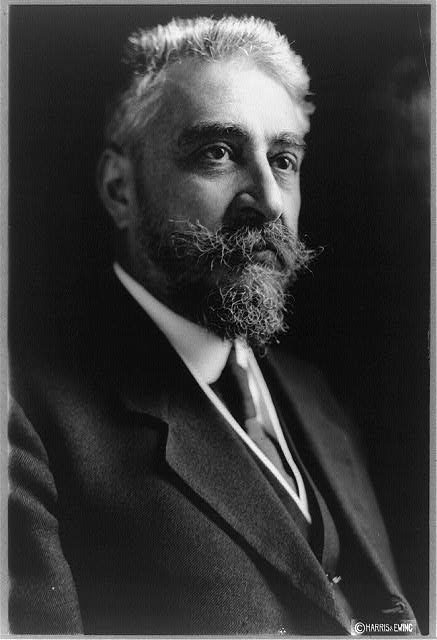
Ion I. C. Brătianu

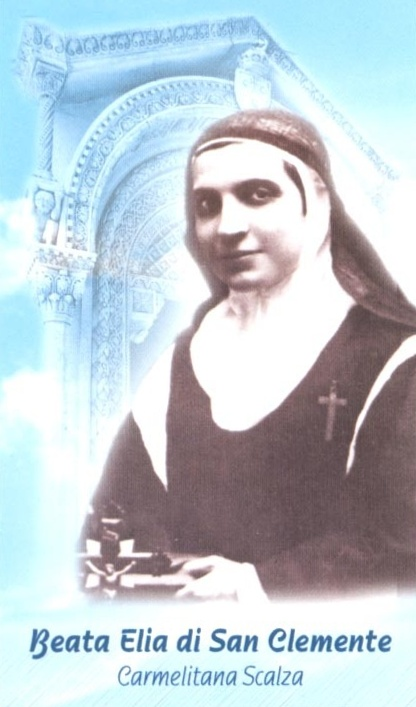
Blessed Teodora Fracasso

- November 1 – Florence Mills, American cabaret singer (b. 1896)
- November 4 – Hawthorne C. Gray, American balloonist (b. 1889)
- November 5 – Augusta Déjerine-Klumpke, American-born French doctor (b. 1859)
- November 6 – Édouard Laguesse, French pathologist and histologist (b. 1861)
- November 7
  - Arvid Gerhard Damm, Swedish engineer and inventor (b. 1869)
  - Augusto Novelli, Italian journalist and writer (b. 1867)
- November 11 – Wilhelm Johannsen, Danish botanist, physiologist and geneticist (b. 1857)
- November 12 – Feliciano Viera, 22nd President of Uruguay (b. 1872)
- November 13 – Friedrich Oskar Giesel, German chemist (b. 1852)
- November 20 – Agnelo de Souza, Portuguese Roman Catholic priest, missionary and venerable (b. 1869)
- November 23
  - Alfred III, Prince of Windisch-Grätz, former Prime Minister of Austria (b. 1851)
  - Miguel Pro, Mexican Jesuit and Roman Catholic priest, martyr and blessed (executed) (b. 1891)
  - Stanisław Przybyszewski, Polish poet and novelist (b. 1868)
- November 24 – Ion I. C. Brătianu, Romanian politician, 22nd Prime Minister of Romania (b. 1864)
- November 29 – Enrique Gómez Carrillo, Guatemalan journalist and writer (b. 1864)
- December 1 – P. Rajagopalachari, Indian administrator (b. 1862)
- December 3 – Orrin Dubbs Bleakley, member of the United States House of Representatives from Pennsylvania (b. 1854)
- December 4 – Joseph Amasa Munk, American physician (b. 1847)
- December 5 – Fyodor Sologub, Soviet poet and novelist (b. 1863)
- December 7
  - Louis Cheikho, Lebanese Jesuit priest and venerable (b. 1859)
  - Gustave Fougères, French archaeologist (b. 1846)
  - Ernesto Noboa y Caamaño, Ecuadoran poet (b. 1889)
- December 9 – Franz Rohr von Denta, Austro-Hungarian field marshal (b. 1854)
- December 14 or 15 – Elsa von Freytag-Loringhoven, German artist and poet (b. 1874)
- December 17
  - Hubert Harrison, American writer, critic, and activist (b. 1883)
  - Rajendra Lahiri, Indian revolutionary, Hindustan Republican Association (b. 1901)
- December 19
  - Ram Prasad Bismil, Indian revolutionary, Hindustan Republican Association (b. 1897)
  - Ashfaqulla Khan, Indian revolutionary, Hindustan Republican Association (b. 1900)
  - Thakur Roshan Singh, Indian revolutionary, Hindustan Republican Association (b. 1892)
- December 23 – Nathan Barnert, American businessman and politician, Mayor of Paterson, New Jersey (b. 1838)
- December 25 – Teodora Fracasso, Italian Roman Catholic religious professed and blessed (b. 1901)
- December 29 – Hakim Ajmal Khan, Indian physician (b. 1868)
- December 30 – Gian Maria Rastellini, Italian painter (b. 1869)

== Nobel Prizes ==

- Physics – Arthur Holly Compton, Charles Thomson Rees Wilson
- Chemistry – Heinrich Otto Wieland
- Physiology or Medicine – Julius Wagner-Jauregg
- Literature – Henri Bergson
- Peace – Ferdinand Buisson, Ludwig Quidde

== See also ==
- One Summer: America, 1927, a book by Bill Bryson
