= Poème de la folie =

1993 novel by Sleim Ammar

Poem of madness
- Author: Sleim Ammar
- Original title: Poème de la folie
- Language: French
- Publisher: L'Art de la composition
- Publication date: 1993
- Publication place: Tunisia
- Pages: 302 pp (first edition)
- ISBN: 9782846280174

Poème de la folie is a novel in verses by Tunisian author Sleim Ammar published in 1993.

== Plot ==
Written in 1992, the poem tells the story of mental illness through the centuries and is intended to be a defense of its changing nature and complexity.
