= Pittsburgh gasometer explosion =

1927 incident in Pittsburgh, Pennsylvania, USA

Coordinates: 40.4472°N 80.0210°W

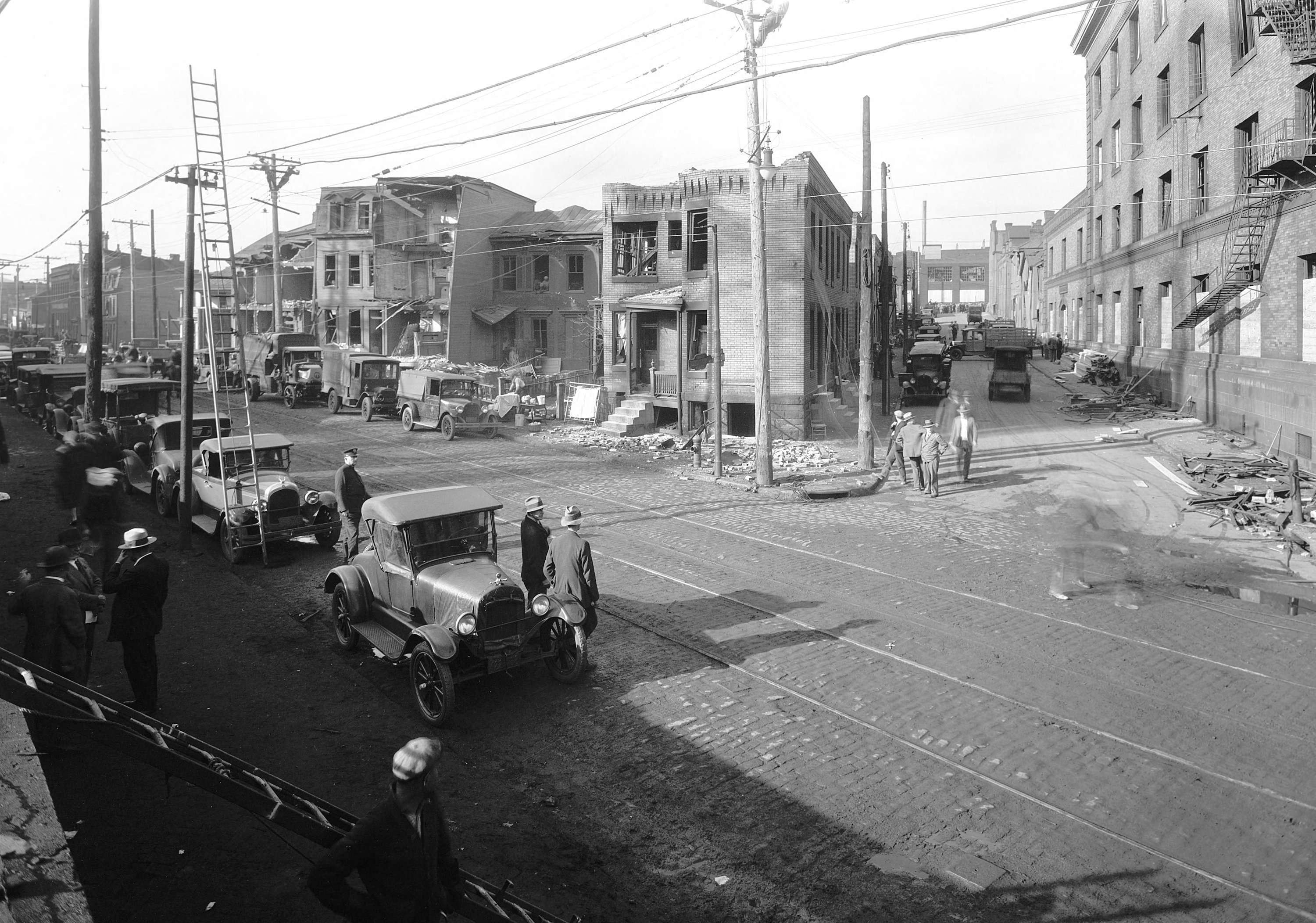
Damage caused by the explosion

The Pittsburgh gasometer explosion, or Equitable Gas explosion, was an accident that took place in Pittsburgh, Pennsylvania on the morning of November 14, 1927.

== History ==
A huge cylindrical gasometer, the largest in the world at that time at 5 million cubic feet (140,000 m^{3}), developed a leak, and repairmen were sent to fix it. The exact cause of the explosion is not known, but some of those repairing the leak were using acetylene torches.

There was a loud explosion, and three gasometers at the site exploded. A "dense mass of dust and smoke" rose from the ruins before igniting into a ball of fire reported as 100 feet in diameter, which rose further before burning out at a height of 1000 feet. Most buildings within a radius of half a mile were damaged, with windows being broken a mile away, causing upwards of $4 million worth of damage.

It was reported that the explosion "caused lofty downtown skyscrapers to tremble and sway as if hit by an earthquake". 28 people were killed and hundreds were injured.
