= Dennis Stanfill =

American business executive (born 1927)

Dennis Carothers Stanfill (born April 1, 1927) is an American business executive, Rhodes Scholar, and philanthropist. He is best known for his stewardship of the 20th Century Fox Film Corporation from 1971 to 1981 as chairman and chief executive officer, succeeding Darryl F. Zanuck.

== Biography ==
=== Early life ===
Stanfill was born in Centerville, Tennessee, the son of Sam Broome and Hattie (Carothers) Stanfill. Stanfill's mother played basketball at the University of Tennessee earning a varsity letter. She was interviewed in Hoop Tales: Tennessee Lady Volunteers by Randy Moore After graduating valedictorian from Lawrenceburgh High School he attended the US Naval Academy. President Harry Truman awarded Stanfill the Class of 1897 Sword for outstanding leadership. In 1949 he won a Rhodes Scholarship to Oxford University. He served as vice president at the Times Mirror Company, and at Lehman Brothers in New York as a corporate finance specialist.

=== 20th Century Fox ===
He joined Fox in 1969 in the newly created post of executive Vice President-finance, and at the same time became a member of Fox’s board of directors and executive committee. In 1971, he succeeded Darryl F. Zanuck as chairman and chief executive officer.

During his tenure at Fox, the studio was turned around from near bankruptcy, partly as a result of the extravagant prior managements. Under Stanfill’s guidance, Fox became a diversified, prosperous company largely through internal development and acquisition activities. The market value of Fox’s common stock in the early 1970s was approximately $40 million; its 1980 sales were $865 million with after-tax profits of $55 million. Stanfill was alleged to have said during his time that "I like power. I am 20th Century Fox."

When Fox was sold to Marvin Davis in June 1981, stockholders received over $800 million in cash and stock. Stanfill cashed in stock options worth $8 million. Later in 1981, Stanfill tried to fire 20th Century Fox Television head Harris L. Katleman for an irregular $2,500 purchase submitted on his expense account (while overseas at an industry event), but the decision was overturned by new Fox owner Davis. With his authority undermined, Stanfill walked away from his 12 years with the studio, citing “a matter of business ethics.”

=== KCET ===
After leaving Fox in 1981 Stanfill, who was already on the Board of Directors of KCET, Los Angeles public television affiliate station, was asked to take the non-salaried position of Chairman. KCET was in considerable financial difficulty. The station had over-spent and over-expanded. Stanfill's reputation in the financial world gave KCET much needed breathing room with its creditors. Stanfill cut staff, got the other expenses under control and went on a fundraising drive. KCET moved to put its Hollywood production facility and offices up for sale while the station's top executives took a 10% cut in salary. When Stanfill accepted his position in 1982, the station was $5.5 million in debt. By the time he stepped down in 1986 KCET was in the black and in active production in both local and national programing.

== Personal life ==
He is married to Therese Olivieri. They had three children. Their daughter, Francesca Stanfill Nye, is a novelist and journalist; she first married inside trader Andrian Antoniu (now known as "Adrian A. Alexander"), but the marriage was annulled 30 days later after his arrest; she then married Peter Tufo; after getting divorced from Tufo, she married Richard Nye. Their son, Dennis, is partner and managing director of HBDesign, Singapore. Another daughter, Michaela Sara Stanfill, was a historical researcher in Boston. The Stanfills have two grandchildren, Serena Tufo Robinson and Peter Stanfill Tufo.
