= M. P. Bajana =

Indian amateur cricketer (1886–1927)

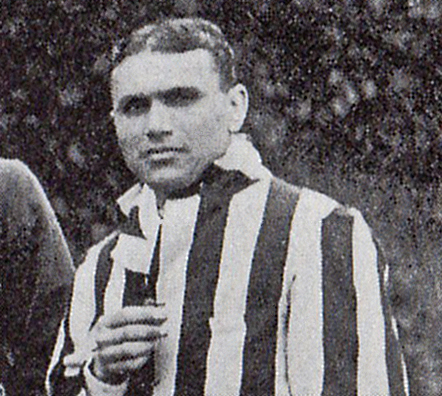
- Bajana with the Somerset team in 1912

Personal information
- Full name: Manek Pallon Bajana
- Born: 14 September 1886; India
- Died: 28 April 1927 (aged 40); London, England
- Nickname: Pyjamas
- Batting: Right-handed
- Role: Opening batsman

Domestic team information
- Years: Team
- 1911: Indians
- 1912–1920: Somerset
- First-class debut: 29 June 1911 Indians v Surrey
- Last First-class: 18 August 1920 Somerset v Middlesex

Career statistics
| Competition | First-class |
|---|---|
| Matches | 55 |
| Runs scored | 1975 |
| Batting average | 20.78 |
| 100s/50s | 3/7 |
| Top score | 115 |
| Balls bowled | 233 |
| Wickets | 4 |
| Bowling average | 33.00 |
| 5 wickets in innings | 0 |
| 10 wickets in match | 0 |
| Best bowling | 2/14 |
| Catches/stumpings | 36/– |
- Source: CricketArchive, 2 February 2010

Manek Pallon Bajana (14 September 1886 – 28 April 1927) was an Indian amateur cricketer who played 55 first-class cricket matches between 1911 and 1920. Originally a member of the Indian team which toured England in 1911, he remained in the country and joined Somerset County Cricket Club, for which he played as an opening batsman until 1920. During his nine-year first-class cricket career, Bajana scored 1,975 runs at an average of 20.78. He scored three centuries, and made his highest score in 1920, scoring 115 runs against Cambridge University.

== Early life and Indian tour ==
Manek Pallon Bajana was born on 14 September 1886 in India. Leading up to 1911, he was employed in India by Maharaja Nripendra Narayan of Cooch Behar, and early that year, Bajana travelled as part of the Maharajah's retinue to England, where Narayan was attending the coronation of King George V. In England, he joined up with the touring Indian cricket team, as one of seven Parsi players in the side. The 1911 tour was the first by a representative Indian team, and included a mix of Hindus, Parsis, Muslims, and two members of the untouchable Chamar caste. Bajana appeared in seven matches during the tour, of which four had first-class status. The team did not fare very well in their contests; the captain of the side, Maharaja Bhupinder Singh of Patiala, only played three matches and spent the rest of his time socialising with the British high society, and there were rumours of sectarianism between the Parsi and Hindu members of the team. In twenty-three matches, they won six and lost fifteen, the remaining two being drawn. Bajana was one of four batsmen to score a first-class century for the Indians; he struck 108 against Somerset at Taunton. On his first-class debut, Bajana suffered the ignominy of a pair – dismissed without scoring in both innings. During the tour, Bajana made it known that he was looking to remain in England and play county cricket. His century against Somerset drew the attention of that county, and he joined them in 1912.

== County cricketer ==
At the time of Bajana's arrival in the Somerset team, the county were struggling to compete in the County Championship, and were making a financial loss. In three of the four years prior to 1912, Somerset had finished bottom of the championship table, and there was little improvement in the final three years before the First World War, each of which resulted in a bottom-three finish. The Somerset cricket historian, David Foot, records that at this time, the county's recruitment policy was "susceptible to exotic grandeur and haughty lineage," and suggested that a player's cricketing ability was often a secondary consideration to their social standing. Bajana made his debut for Somerset in May 1912, opening the batting for the county against Sussex. He scored twenty-two and seven in a six-wicket victory for his county. In the subsequent match, against Hampshire, Bajana scored his first half-century in county cricket, hitting 71 runs in the second innings; the highest score of any Somerset batsman in the match. He passed 50 on three further occasions that year, and along with Len Braund and Ernie Robson, was ever-present in the Somerset team that season. His year's aggregate of 575 runs in the County Championship, and his score of 95, made against Worcestershire in August, were both the county's best that season, in a year in which no player scored a century for Somerset.

Bajana appeared less frequently for Somerset in 1913, playing ten matches for the county. He only scored one half-century, accruing 78 runs against Derbyshire. His batting average of 19.75 in 1913 placed him fourth in the Somerset batting averages.

He did not play for Somerset in 1914, as business interests had taken him to London. Instead he played regularly for Shepherd's Bush, for whom he had appeared on occasion from his first arrival in England, and for whom in 1914 he made two centuries over one bank holiday weekend; 134 against Brixton and 121 against North London.

At the outbreak of the First World War county cricket was suspended, but Bajana continued to play for Shepherd's Bush until in 1916 he became involved in the foundation of the Indian Gymkhana club in Mill Hill, north London, scoring a century in the club's first match against Australian Imperial Forces. Thereafter Bajana played, and captained, in a number of matches for Indian Gymkhana, scoring another century for the team against a New Zealand APS side in 1918.

In 1919 he returned to the Somerset team, playing in six of their twelve County Championship matches. His batting average of 27.55 in that competition was the second-highest amongst his team, bettered only by Jack MacBryan. Bajana hit two half-centuries during the season, scoring 77 against Derbyshire, and 59 against Essex. The following 1920 season was Bajana's last with Somerset. He appeared fifteen times for the county in first-class cricket, averaging just over twenty. In a match against Cambridge University, he achieved his highest first-class score, hitting 14 fours on his way to a total of 115 runs in 135 minutes. In his next match, he scored a second century for Somerset, and his only one in the County Championship, scoring 106 runs against Warwickshire. Bajana played his final first-class match against Middlesex in August 1920, scoring six and a duck. In all, Bajana scored 1,975 first-class runs at an average of 20.78. He scored three centuries and seven half-centuries in 96 innings. He was rarely used as a bowler, and took four wickets at an average of 33.00.

== Personal and later life ==
In his history of Somerset cricket, David Foot describes Bajana as a "smallish solidly built opening bat". During his time at Somerset, he was known as "Pyjamas", which sounds similar to his surname. For a time, he ran an antiques and art dealership in Bayswater, London with Constantine Diamandis, but they dissolved their partnership in early 1920. After the conclusion of his first-class cricket career, he continued to play for Indian Gymkhana, including matches at Lord's against the Marylebone Cricket Club in each of 1922, 1923 and 1924. He died in Bethnal Green, London on 28 April 1927 at the age of 40.

== Bibliography ==
- Roebuck, Peter (1991). From Sammy to Jimmy: The Official History of Somerset County Cricket Club. London: Partridge Press. ISBN 1-85225-085-2.
