= Sleim Ammar =

Sleim Ammar سليم عمار
- Born: Abdessalem Ben Hedi Ammar; June 30, 1927; Sousse, Tunisia
- Died: November 6, 1999 (aged 72); Le Plessis-Robinson
- Education: Paris School of Medicine
- Years active: 1954-1999
- Medical career
- Field: Neurology; Neuropsychiatry
- Notable works: Autopsie de la guerre Poème de la folie Problèmes de notre temps

Sleim Ammar (Arabic: سليم عمار), born 30 June 1927 in Sousse, and died on 6 November 1999 in Le Plessis-Robinson, was a Tunisian neuropsychiatrist and poet.

He was one of the founders of Maghreb psychiatry and also a corresponding member of the Arab Academy of Damascus.

== Works ==
- En souvenir de la médecine arabe - Quelques-uns de ses grands noms, Tunis, Imprimerie Bascone & Muscat, 1965.
- Poème de la médecine arabe, Tunis, Alif, 1990, 153 p. (ISBN 978-9973716187).
- Autopsie de la guerre, Tunis, L'Art de la composition, 1992, 168 p. (ISBN 978-9973172563).
- Poème de la folie, Tunis, L'Art de la composition, 1993, 302 p. (ISBN 978-9973173843).
- Ibn Al Jazzar et l'école médicale de Kairouan, Sousse, Faculté de médecine Ibn El Jazzar de Sousse, 1994, 135 p. (ISBN 978-9973174802).
- Itinéraires: 153 poèmes écrits de 1987 à 1993, 1995, 387 p. (ISBN 978-9973175243).
- Problèmes de notre temps: 167 poèmes écrits de 1988 à 1995, Ben Arous, Imprimerie principale, 1996, 479 p. (ISBN 978-9973176493).
- Abû Bekr Er-Razi, Rhazès: le Galien des arabes, 1997, 200 p. (ISBN 978-9973177575).
- Ibn Sina Avicenne: la vie et l'œuvre, Tunis, L'Or du Temps, 1998, 134 p. (ISBN 978-9973757432).

== Awards ==
- 1966: Académie Nationale de Médecine, Paris
- 1973: Premier prix intermaghrébien de médecine, Tunis
- 1984: Prix Médecine Maghreb, Paris
- 1986: Prix national de la vulgarisation scientifique, Tunis
- 1992: Prix international de psychiatrie de la Fondation Saugstad (shared), Oslo

== Bibliography ==
- Hommage à Sleïm Ammar: l'homme et l'œuvre, Carthage, Beït El Hikma, 2000, 192 p. (ISBN 978-9973929600).
