= Joseph Amasa Munk =

American physician and author (1847–1927)

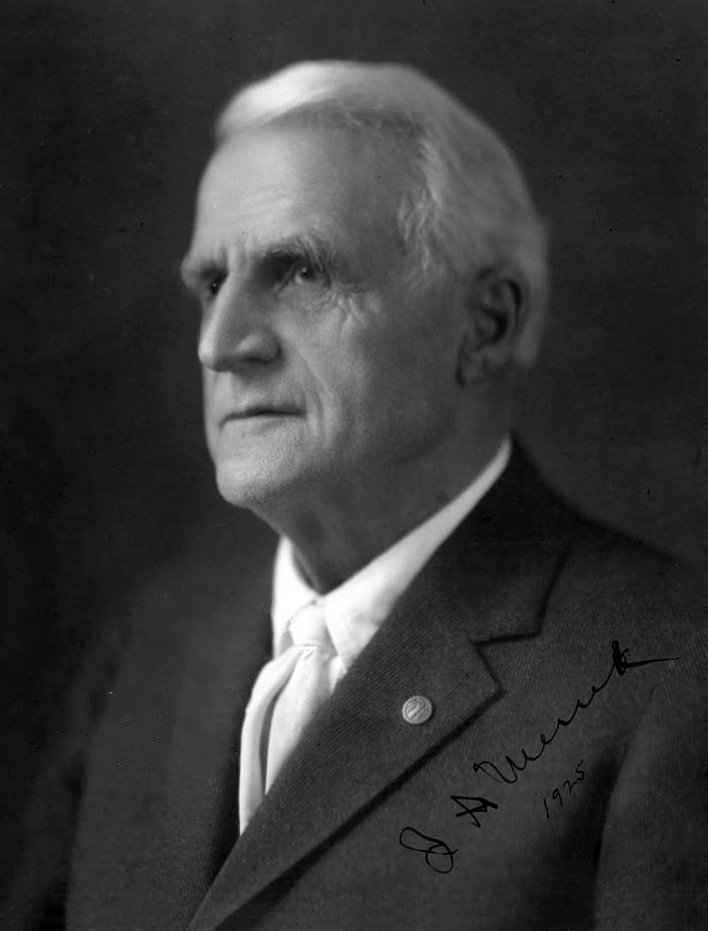
- Joseph Amasa Munk in 1925
- Born: November 9, 1847; Columbiana Co., Ohio
- Died: December 4, 1927 (aged 80)
- Occupation: Doctor (Eclectic Medicine)
- Known for: Collection and authorship of books on Arizona.

Joseph Amasa Munk (November 9, 1847 – December 4, 1927) was a Los Angeles, California, physician who had an interest in a Willcox, Cochise County, Arizona ranch, who became greatly interested in the history and lore of Arizona. He accumulated a large and important collection of books about Arizona, which he donated to the University of Arizona in Tucson. (The collection was later acquired by the Southwest Museum in Los Angeles.) He also wrote a copiously illustrated guide, Arizona Sketches, to some of the more important landmarks in the state.

Munk was born in Columbiana County, Ohio on Nov 9, 1847, son of Joseph and Maria Rosenberry Munk. He fought in Civil War, and after he returned home in 1865 he attended Mount Union College in Alliance, Ohio and then at Eclectic Medical Institute of Cincinnati, where he graduated in 1869. He first practiced in Lindsey, Ohio, then in Chillicothe, Missouri (1871), Topeka, Kansas (1881), and finally settled in Los Angeles, California (1892). In 1876 he was elected vice president of the National Eclectic Medical Association. He was also professor and dean of climatology of the Los Angeles Eclectic Policinic, of which he was a founder. Munk married Emma Beazall in 1873. He died ("of angina pectoris") in Los Angeles 4 Dec 1927.

In 1883 Munk became partners in a cattle ranch located near Willcox, Arizona. In 1884 he made his first trip to the state. In order to learn more about the area, he bought Richard Josiah Hinton's The Handbook to Arizona and then bought books mentioned in it. This marked the beginning of his career as a bibliophile and what was to become a large and important collection of books about Arizona. By 1900 this collection was large enough for him to publish a bibliography describing it. In order to find a home for his library and collection, Munk donated it in 1908 to the University of Arizona Library where the collection was described in a bibliography written by Hector Alliot. The collection was later acquired by the Southwest Museum, Los Angeles

Munk's brother was Edward R. Monk, who, in addition to being Munk's partner in Arizona business, was a judge in Cochise County, Arizona from 1886 to 1890, and a regent of the university in 1895.

== Works ==
- Arizona Sketches (1905)
- Arizona Bibliography: Private Collection of Arizoniana (1908)
- Southwest Sketches (1920)
- Activities of a Lifetime (1924)
- History of Arizona Literature (1925)
- Story of the Munk Library of Arizoniana (1927)
