= Foqion Postoli =

Albanian writer and activist

- Born: 23 July 1889; Korçë, Manastir Vilayet, Ottoman Empire
- Died: 2 October 1927 (aged 38); Korçë, Albania
- Occupation: Writer
- Known for: Flower of Remembrance

Foqion Postoli (23 July 1889 – 2 October 1927) was an Albanian novelist and playwright best known for his novel, Flower of Remembrance (Albanian: Lulja e kujtimit).

== Life ==
Postoli was born to a merchant family in Korçë and studied commerce in Istanbul for two years, living with relatives. He later emigrated to the United States, settling in Massachusetts. In his new home he joined the Vatra, the Pan-Albanian Federation of America, was secretary for the Vatra branch in Brockton and worked on Dielli (The Sun, published by Vatra). Portions of his novels would be published as supplements to Dielli before their publication in book form.

Postoli wrote during the final years of the Albanian National Awakening and Albanian independence. Although he lived in a different era than other rilindas writers, he reflected similar themes: patriotism, opposition to Ottoman rule and pride to the country's history. His 1919 In Defense of the Homeland was typical of his nationalistic, romantic work. His novels were often inspired by problems he observed.

On 4 January 1919, Postoli was a signatory of a memorandum sent to the United States government by the Congress of Vatra. The congress, held at Winthrop Hall in Boston, demanded the demarcation of borders based on the 1913 Treaty of London. In 1921, he returned in his home town in Albania to help establish the Orthodox Autocephalous Church of Albania. He died on 2 October 1927, at age 38.

== Flower of Remembrance ==
Postoli's novel, Flower of Remembrance, has a political background, and scholar Robert Elsie called it a slight improvement on a predictable plot. The novel, primarily written in 1919, was published in Korçë in 1924. Its romantic conflict has elements of the late-19th-century Albanian National Awakening. It became one of the best-known Albanian novels of the 1920s and 1930s. It later inspired an opera by Kristo Kono, with a libretto by Andon Mara and Aleko Skali. The opera premiered in 1961 and was revived in 1978 and 2012.

The novel takes place in a commercial environment blanketed with Greek propaganda. Young Dhimitri, who works at Kristo's shop, loves Kristo's only daughter Olimbia. Olimbia loves him, despite his poverty. To improve his business Kristo hires Niko, a secretary from Greece. Niko insinuates himself with Kristo, engineering a marriage proposal. Although Olimbia protests that she loves Dhimitri, Kristo conspires with Niko to turn Dhimitri in to the Ottoman authorities as a nationalist sympathizer connected to insurgents.

Dhimitri, warned by Olimbia, flees from Korçë to Monastir (where insurgents are stationed). In the middle of a wild winter night a pack of wolves attacks Dhimitri, killing his horse, and he barely escapes with the help of the insurgents. News reaches Korçë that Dhimitri is dead, and Olimbia despairs. Two years later Dhimitri is seen again in Korçë as commander of the movement to liberate Albania, foiling Niko's plans to steal Kriso's wealth by marrying Olimbia (with Kristo's blessing) and planning to open his own business.
