= Paola Renata Carboni =

Venerable Paola Renata Carboni
- Born: 21 February 1908; Italy
- Died: 11 September 1927 (aged 19); Italy

Paola Renata Carboni (21 February 1908 - 11 September 1927) was an Italian teenager. In her beatification process, she was declared venerable in 1993.

== Life ==
Carboni was the fourth of eight children of a physician who refused to permit his children to attend church or be instructed in religion. An aunt secretly had the girl baptised and taught her the beginnings of the catechism. When she was fourteen, she and one of her sisters were sent to a separate school and lived near a devout Catholic family who took them to Mass. Both Carboni and her sister began attending church and studying with a priest, who secretly bestowed them the sacrament of Holy Communion and confirmation. The girls eventually told their father, who continued to object to their religious practice but reluctantly allowed them to continue attending church.

Carboni had hoped to become a missionary, but her weak health, including a form of colic she suffered from age thirteen, prevented it. She became a teacher instead at a Catholic school, where she taught for two years. She also joined the group Catholic Action and served as the diocesan secretary of the Female Youth. Younger girls often came to her for help with their problems and spiritual counsel. She and her sister made a pilgrimage to Rome in the spring of 1927 and visited places frequented by their favourite saint, Therese of Lisieux. During the pilgrimage, Carboni made a vow of virginity.

In August 1927, Carboni contracted typhus and developed a high fever. She faced death peacefully, to the dismay of her relatives, especially her father, who was helpless to end her suffering or make her well. She was said to have offered up her suffering for the conversion of sinners and for her father, who she hoped would convert to Catholicism. When she died, her father refused to enter the church for her funeral, but did go to the graveyard for the service. He remarked, "Now she is with her God". Some years later, her father did decide to convert to Catholicism.

Carboni was declared venerable by the Roman Catholic Church in 1993. Her remains are interred in the Church of the Madonna of Mercy in Fermo.
