= Egyptian Building =

Historic college building in Richmond, Virginia, USA

- U.S. National Register of Historic Places
- U.S. National Historic Landmark
- Virginia Landmarks Register
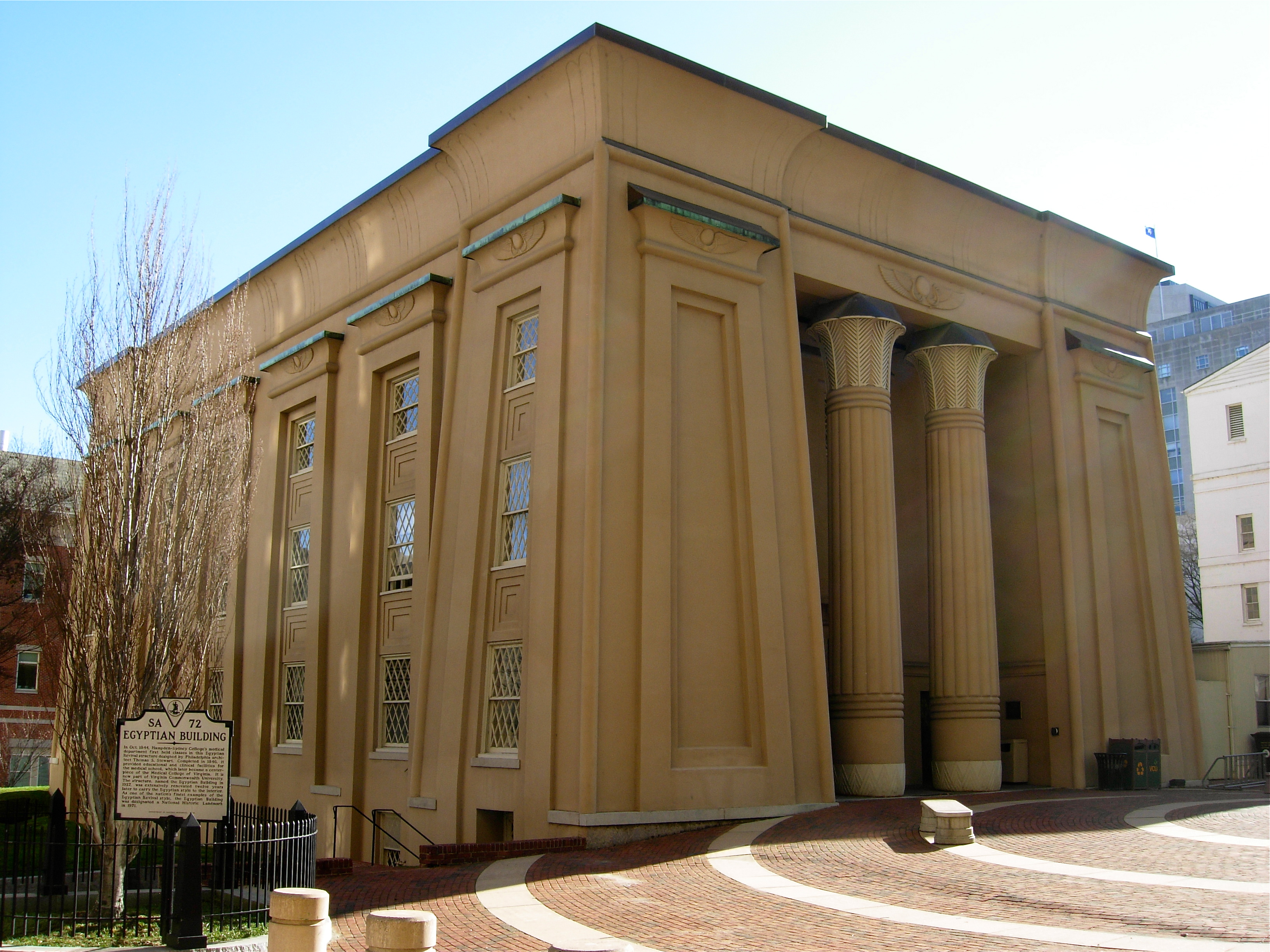
- Front view of the Egyptian Building

- Location within Virginia Location within the United States
- Location: Richmond, Virginia
- Coordinates: 37°32′25″N 77°25′45″W
- Built: 1845
- Architect: Thomas Stewart
- Architectural style: Egyptian Revival
- NRHP reference No.: 69000321
- VLR No.: 127-0087

Significant dates
- Added to NRHP: April 16, 1969
- Designated NHL: November 11, 1971
- Designated VLR: November 5, 1968

The Egyptian Building is a historic college building in Richmond, Virginia constructed in 1845. It was the first permanent home of the Medical Department of Hampden-Sydney College. In 1854, they received an independent charter after parting ways with the college. In 1893, the building became the inaugural home for the Medical College of Virginia (MCV) and now is a part of Virginia Commonwealth University. It is considered by architectural scholars to be one of the finest surviving Egyptian Revival-style buildings in the United States. The Egyptian Building was added to the Virginia Landmarks Register in 1968, the National Register of Historic Places in 1969, and designated as a National Historic Landmark in 1971. It is the oldest medical college building in the South.

== History ==
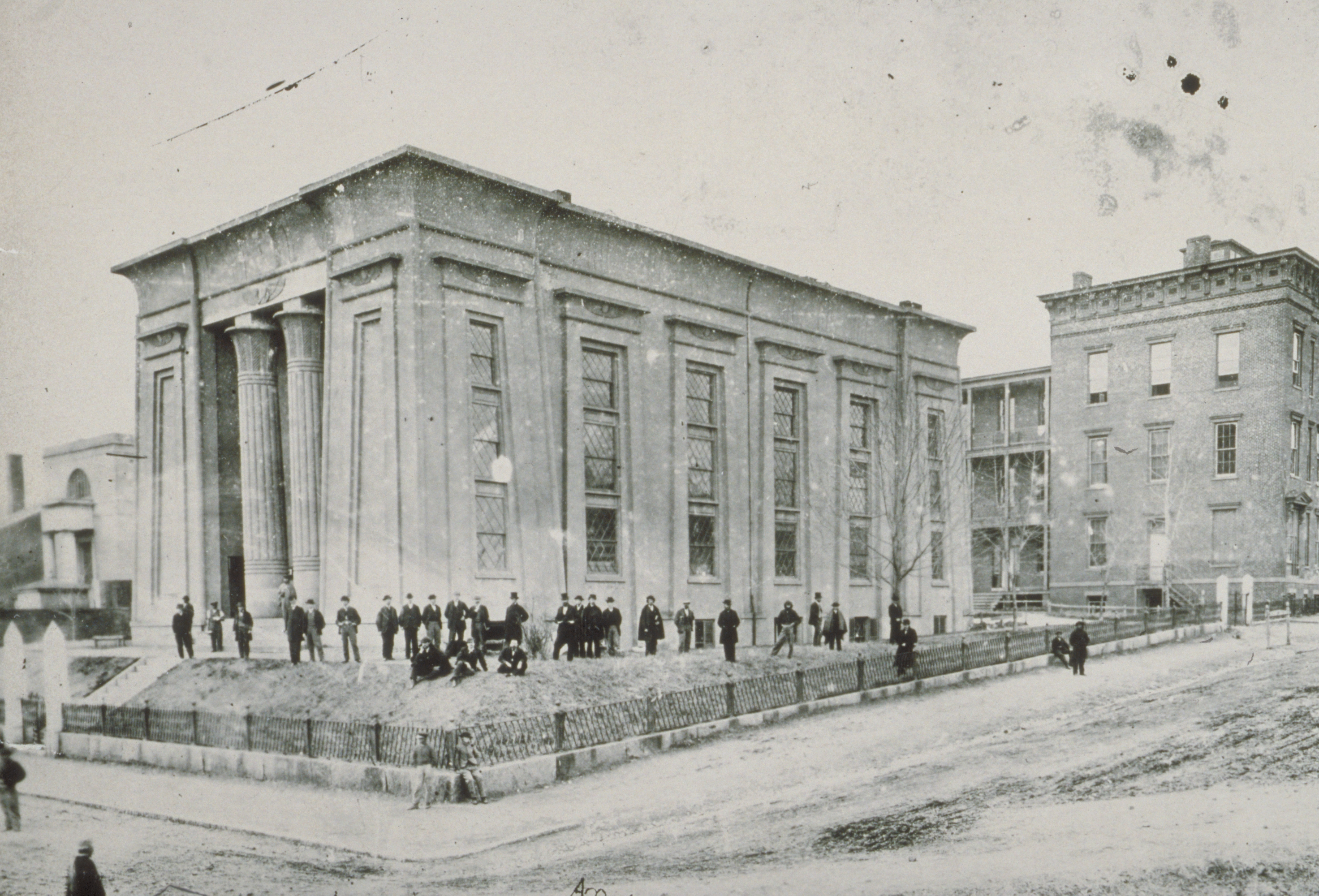
Students and faculty in front of the Egyptian Building in the late 19th century.

After several years based in the Union Hotel since the medical department's establishment in 1838, the Hampden-Sydney College board decided they needed a space specifically created for medical education. Aid was sought to pay for the structure, and the Commonwealth offered a $25,000 loan while the City of Richmond donated $2,000. The board chose the noted Philadelphia architect, Thomas Somerville Stewart, who had just completed the new St Paul's Episcopal Church, to construct the new building. Stewart chose for his design the Egyptian Revival mode, considered to be an exotic style. This choice was deemed appropriate by the board because it was considered that the origins of medicine went back to the Egyptian physician, Imhotep. Sir William Osler wrote that Imhotep was the "first figure of a physician to stand out clearly from the mists of antiquity."

The Egyptian Building was originally called College Building, and later the Old College Building. The National Register of Historic Places considers it to be the oldest medical college building in the South. The battered corners of the walls of the structure recall the temples of ancient Egypt.

The building housed most educational activities until the 1890s and included medical lecture halls, a dissecting room, an infirmary, and hospital beds for medical and surgical cases. The building was restored in 1939 by the architects, Baskervill and Son, in honor of Dr. Simon Baruch, an 1862 graduate of the Medical College of Virginia who served as a Confederate surgeon during the Civil War. Unfortunately, none of the original interiors have survived.

The building has been in continuous use since it was built in 1845. In 1969, it became a historic landmark, and in 1995, it celebrated its 150th anniversary. It has at one time or another been used by every school in the Medical College. The MCV campus has a strong sentimental attachment to the Egyptian Building, and it is the most prominent feature of the VCU seal. At Founders' Day exercises held at the Egyptian Building in December 1940, historian Dr. Wyndham Blanton commented to alumni and guests:

What old Nassau Hall is to Princeton, what the Wren Building is to William and Mary, what the Rotunda is to the University of Virginia, the Egyptian Building is to the Medical College of Virginia. It is a shrine, a sanctuary of tradition, the physical embodiment of our genius. It is a spiritual heritage. In a world often accused of cold materialism, with an ideology of human self-sufficiency, and an adoration of objects that can be handled and seen, there is a need for things of the spirit, if science is to do more than make life safer, longer and more comfortable.

== Architecture ==
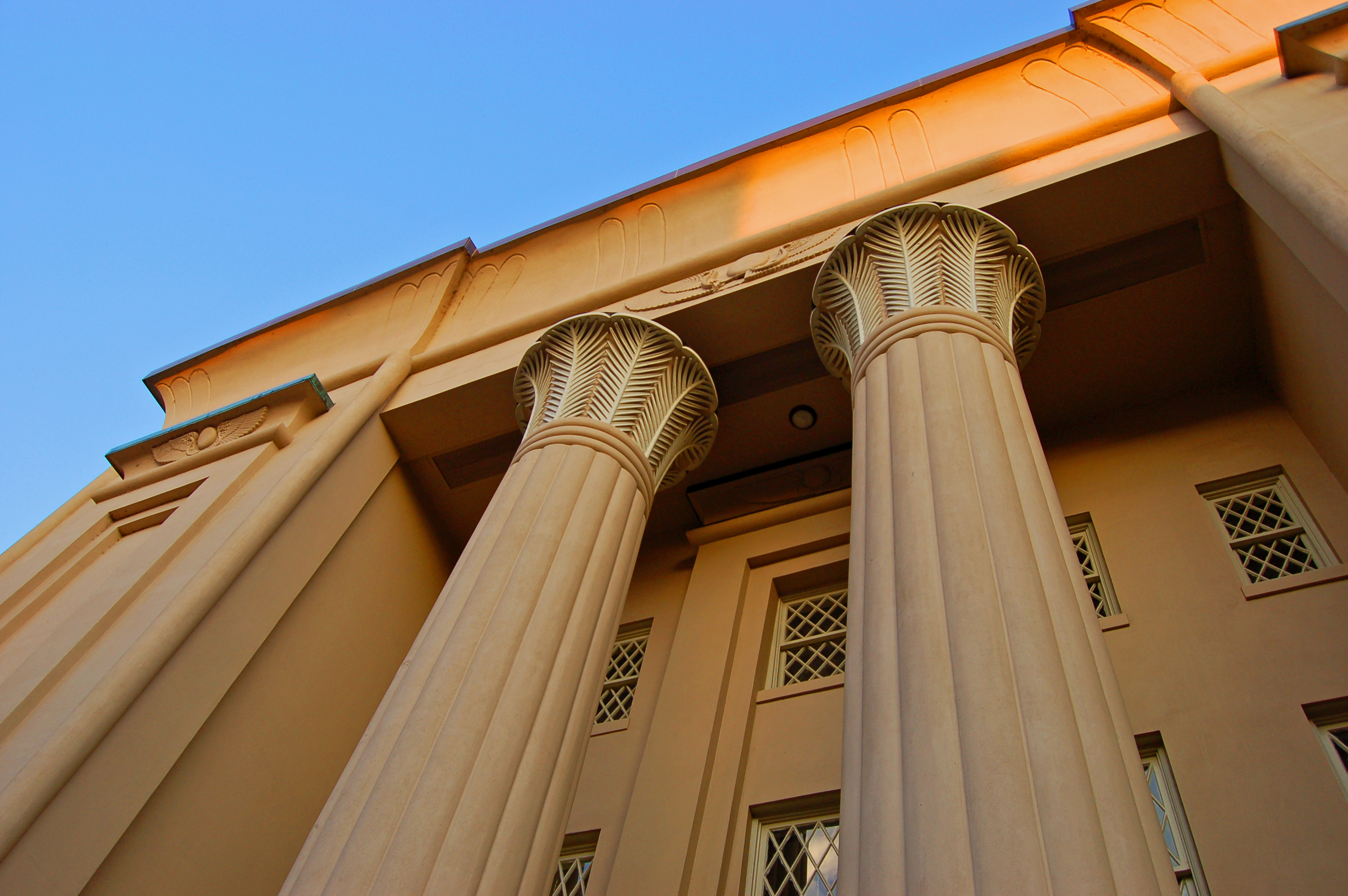
Detail of east portico.

The building is constructed from brick, stucco and cast iron. Its battered walls—thinner at the top than at the bottom—give an impression of solidity and height. This effect is emphasized by the relatively minimal windows for a five-story building. These windows are diamond paned and incorporated without a style break. A primary feature of the building is its distyle in antis porticoes with monumental columns at each end. The columns have intricate palm frond capitals. The shafts of each column represent bundles of reeds. Several obelisks flank the structure and are connected by a cast-iron fence that incorporates what appears to be hermai, resembling sarcophagi (mummy cases), forged by R. W. Barnes of Richmond.

Also prominent throughout the building is the use of the Winged sun disk. On the exterior it is found repeated in the cavetto cornices that cap the pylons. This winged disk represents Horus, as a sun disk with outstretched wings, flanked by the goddesses Bekbet and Uaset in the form of snakes. This is the form Horus took in Egyptian mythology when he battled the god Set.

On the interior, the lotus flower design is used repeatedly. The interior colors have intentional symbolic meaning: red represents divine love; blue represents divine intelligence; and the golden yellow represents the mercy of God. Hieroglyphs are incorporated in the antechamber decorations and the floor tiles depict a large scarab beetle.

The lintel, or horizontal part of the doorjamb, bears a different set of messages. On the left is reads, "Tutankhamen: To whom life is given forever" and on the right it reads,"Tutankhamen: Living image of Amon." This message likely represents the fervor with which the public associated Egypt with the child Pharaoh, King Tut (Tutankhamen), who was discovered in 1922, very near to when this interior was remodeled.

== See also ==
- List of National Historic Landmarks in Virginia
- National Register of Historic Places listings in Richmond, Virginia
