= Arthur Nash =

Arthur Nash may refer to:

- Arthur Nash (businessman) (1870–1927)
- Arthur Nash (architect) (1871–1969)
- Arthur Nash (ice hockey) (1914–2000)
