= Church of St. Luke and The Epiphany (Philadelphia) =

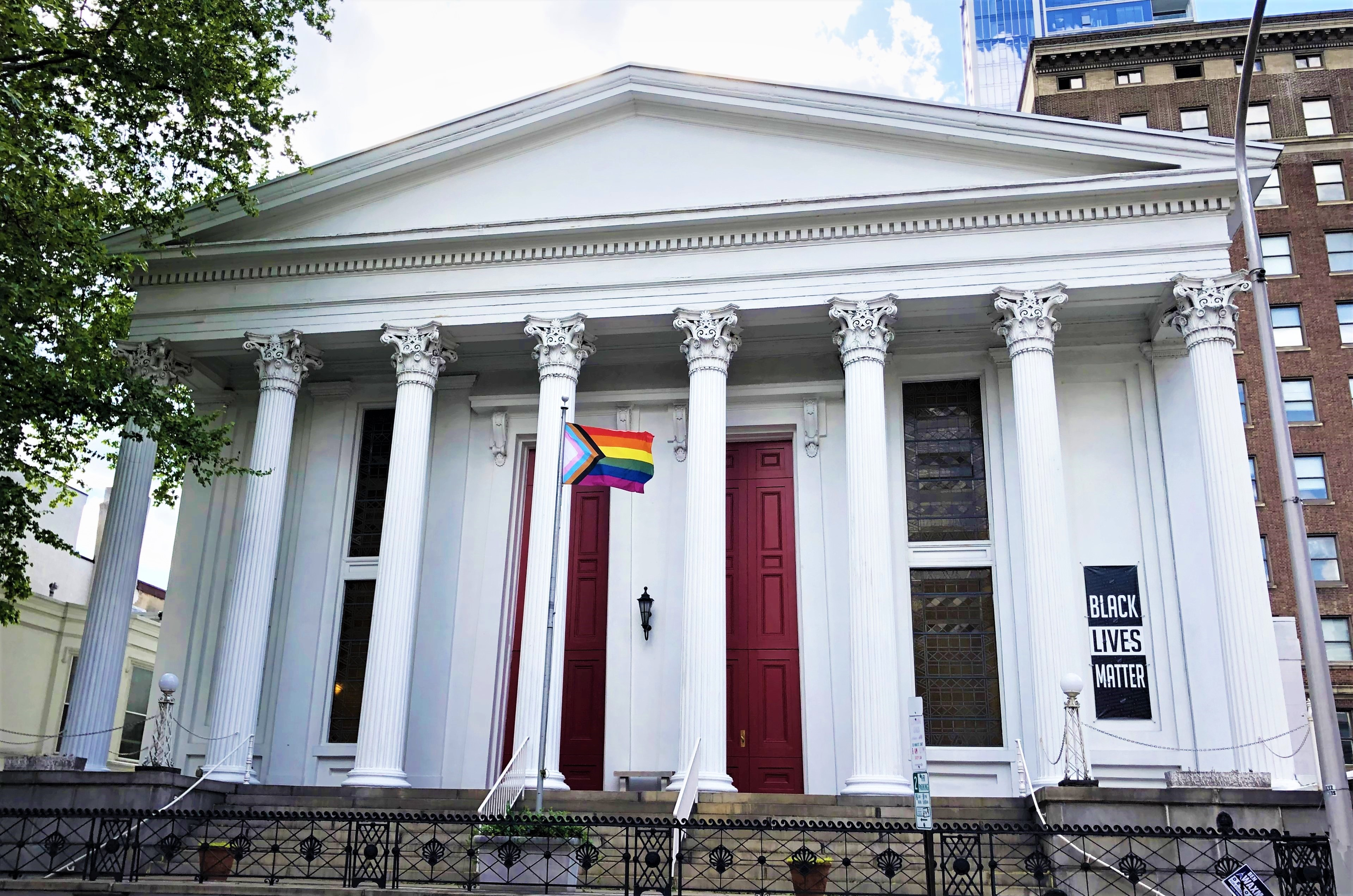
- (2022)
- Church of St. Luke and The Epiphany
- 39°56′45″N 75°09′47″W
- Location: Philadelphia, Pennsylvania
- Country: United States
- Denomination: Episcopal
- Churchmanship: Broad church
- Website: http://www.slatechurch.org/

Philadelphia Register of Historic Places
- Designated: 1961

History
- Former name: St. Luke’s Church (1839–1898)
- Founded: April 6, 1898
- Consecrated: October 16, 1840

Architecture
- Architect(s): Thomas Somerville Stewart; Furness & Hewitt (1875, chapel and parish house); Wilson Eyre, Jr. (1906 renovation)
- Style: Greek Revival
- Groundbreaking: May 24, 1839
- Construction cost: $58,000

Specifications
- Capacity: about 1,000

Administration
- Province: Three
- Diocese: Pennsylvania (1784)
- Deanery: Southwark

The Church of Saint Luke and The Epiphany is an Episcopal congregation located at 330 South 13th Street between Spruce and Pine Streets in the Center City neighborhood of Philadelphia. It is part of the Diocese of Pennsylvania. The church was formed in 1898 as a result of the merger of St. Luke's Church (1839) and The Church of The Epiphany (1834), which consolidated at St. Luke's location.

The church building was constructed in 1839–1840 for St. Luke's and was designed by Thomas Somerville Stewart in the Greek Revival style. Additions and renovations were made in 1875 and 1906. The building was listed on the Philadelphia Register of Historic Places in 1961.

In 2025, the parish reported average Sunday attendance of 68 with plate and pledge income of $239,360; in 2015, it reported average Sunday attendance of 140 and annual income of $262,943. As an urban parish, the congregation reflects the racial, cultural, and gender diversity found in the city. This diversity contributes to the church's reputation for being open and welcoming, a trait it exhibited during the AIDS Crisis of the 1980s, when it was one of the first churches in the city to open its doors to allow funerals for those who had died from AIDS.

== History ==
=== St. Luke's Church (1839–1898) ===
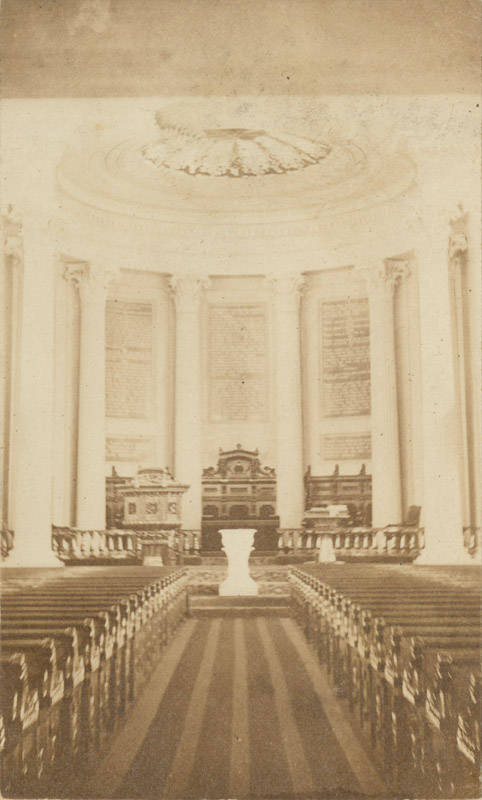
The interior of St. Luke's c. 1868

A committee of 18 men (Note: James Dundas, William Welsh, John Welsh, Jr., James S. Newbold, Thomas Dunlap, George Witman, William H. Newbold, Joseph Bispham, William L. Newbold, Edward W. Warner, Gideon Scull, Samuel Breck, John R. Milner, Nathan Smith, John Grigg, S. Robert, Mordecai D. Lewis, David M. Broadhead) from seven Philadelphia Episcopal parishes organized St. Luke's Church in 1839. Their goal being the establishment of an Episcopal congregation on the southwestern edge of development within the original boundaries of Philadelphia (it would take almost another 10 years before an Episcopal church was organized across Broad Street and below Chestnut Street – St. Mark's Church at 16th and Locust Streets). These men advanced the money to build the church and were repaid through the sale of pews. Several sites were considered including the corner Broad and Locust Streets and the corner of 13th and Spruce Streets. These locations were rejected due to cost. The committee chose the present site of the church and selected Philadelphia architect Thomas Somerville Stewart to design the structure. Stewart's design is one of the finest examples of Greek Revival architecture surviving in the city.

The committee submitted the church's charter to the Episcopal Diocese of Pennsylvania's Standing Committee for approval. Upon the first reading the charter was denied because, in the opinion of the Standing Committee, too much money was allocated to the "education of Youth and the Support of the Poor of the Congregation." The committee explained this clause to mean that the charter permitted "the application of revenue" to only those "in immediate association" with the congregation. The Standing Committee agreed with the rationale and St. Luke's Church was admitted to the Church and the Diocese at the 55th Convention of the Diocese of Pennsylvania on May 22, 1839.

A ceremony was held on June 24, 1839, for the laying of the northeasternmost cornerstone of the building. Bishop Henry Ustick Onderdonk led a procession which began at his home and ended at the site of the church. The procession included many Philadelphia clergy and vestrymen. Bishop Onderdonk addressed the crowd and at the end of his address a lead box containing the Bible, Book of Common Prayer, a "Diocese of Pennsylvania Convention Journal", several copies of Philadelphia and Episcopal newspapers, and a copy of St. Luke's charter was placed within the cornerstone. The ceremony was concluded with sealing the cornerstone.

At the time of the laying of the cornerstone, a rector had yet to be named. The vestry selected the Rev. Edmund Neville of Taunton, Massachusetts. Humbled by the call, Neville declined the offer because he felt organizing and growing a new congregation was too much for him to bear. The vestry then selected the Rev. William W. Spear, rector of St. Michael's Church, Charleston, South Carolina. He accepted the call on July 15, 1840.

Bishop Onderdonk consecrated St. Luke's Church on October 16, 1840, and the first regular services were held on October 18 (St. Luke's Day). By all accounts, the first year was a success. Its location on 13th Street placed the parish near rapidly growing areas. As Spear noted at the 57th Diocesan Convention: "The wisdom of the location [is] best attested by the fact that throughout the winter its services have been attended by numerous and generally crowded congregations and its temporal interest has already reached a degree of prosperity scarcely anticipated."

St. Luke's infant years were a period of healthy congregational growth, but compounded with serious financial constraints. By late 1841, it became clear that the congregation had not raised enough money through the sale of pews to pay for the building's construction costs. Further, the church's operating costs far exceeded its income. Initial cuts were to the music program. This action had the unintended result of further reducing the number of pew holders. Further cost-cutting measures were considered, including eliminating the paid choir, reducing salaries of the rector, and contracting the number of weekly services. These options were not attractive to Spear or the vestry. The vestry added surtaxes upon the pews and took occasional special collections to reduce the church's operating deficits. In the end, the burden of reducing the church's operating costs fell upon Spear himself. Twice during his rectorship his salary was reduced. Spear's salary had been slashed from $2,500 per annum in 1841 to $1,500 in 1845. In September 1845, Spear resigned to assume the position of associate editor of the Episcopal Recorder, which was published in Philadelphia. Mr. Spear continued to fill the pulpit until his successor was named.

The Rev. Mark Antony DeWolfe Howe, rector of St. James’ Church in Roxbury, Massachusetts, accepted the Church's call in June 1846. Early in his rectorship, plans were developed to satisfy the church's debt. William Welsh, a noted Philadelphia merchant, Episcopal philanthropist, and vestryman, issued a challenge to the congregation. He would contribute 60% of the funds needed to pay the debts if the vestry could raise the rest. The church rose to his challenge and the church's debts were satisfied in September 1851.

Mr. Welsh's generosity and the Rev. Dr. Howe's leadership allowed St. Luke's to become one of the most prominent parishes in the city. Early in the 1850s, the congregation grew to near seated capacity. Howe wrote to the vestry to ask that the church be renovated to seat more people as he had requests to purchase pews that could not be accommodated. These plans would not be realized until much later. Howe was committed to missionary work both at home and abroad. For example, St. Luke's assumed the administration of Church of the Ascension at 11th and Lombard Streets between 1861 and 1867. Ascension was administered as the "St. Luke’s Mission Chapel." Howe also expanded the Church's benevolent activities, including establishing the St. Luke's Church Home for Aged Women in 1871, thanks to the generosity of Asa Whitney.

Soon after Howe's arrival, he became active in local and national Episcopal circles. He was considered one of the city's most important and influential Episcopal clergymen. For example, he was elected missionary Bishop of Nevada in 1865, a position he declined. As Howe rose to national prominence, so to did the profile of St. Luke's. St. Luke's Church hosted its first diocesan convention in 1854; further, the Church hosted the general convention in 1865. As the first convention after the Civil War, it was unclear if the war wounds could be healed. As Morgan Dix, rector of the old St. Paul's Chapel of the Parish of Trinity Church on Wall Street in lower Manhattan of New York City remarked:

[T]he Convention assembled in St. Luke's Church, for the opening service, one of the southern Bishops was there. He came alone, and took a seat among the congregation: he looked like a stranger. That was a sight which his brethren in the Apostolic Episcopate could not bear. They saw him; they became uneasy. At last they sent a dignified messenger to tell him he must come to them. Then he hesitated no longer; he arose, and just as he was, with no vestment or robe of office, passed up to the chancel and went to his brethren. I was told that there was not a dry eye in that august company at that moment. Men felt that GOD was giving answer to the question of whether this Church could be one again.

Near the end of Dr. Howe's rectorship, the Church of the Ascension proposed to buy St. Luke's Church. Howe asked the vestry to consider this offer seriously. Many of St. Luke's parishioners had already moved west of Broad Street. Further, Howe was concerned about the possibility of the African Episcopal Church of St. Thomas purchasing Ascension's building. For these reasons, Howe wondered if the time had come for St. Luke's to move west, too. Sites were considered at 22nd and Spruce Streets, 22nd and Walnut Streets, 18th Street and Rittenhouse Square, and several others. However, the vestry eventually decided to stay on 13th Street.

Howe's rectorship ended in 1871 after twenty-five years. He was elected the first bishop of Central Pennsylvania in 1871. He was installed as bishop at St. Luke's Church on December 8, 1871. Howe's contributions to the parish are remembered in the form of a memorial tablet in the church's sanctuary. Wallis E. Howe, a Providence, RI, architect and the Rev. Dr. Howe's youngest son, designed the tablet. Howe's eldest son, Dr. Herbert M. Howe, a physician and capitalist, donated the tablet to the parish. The tablet was dedicated on March 28, 1909.

The Rev. Charles George Currie, rector of Grace Church, Providence, Rhode Island, was unanimously elected rector, and Dr. Howe's successor, on July 1, 1872. The Rev. Dr. Currie's rectorship began on a promising note. George Leib Harrison, vestryman and industrialist, donated the funds to expand the church. He commissioned Furness & Hewitt to construct a parish house with a chapel for additional capacity. The Harrison addition (now known as the Furness Chapel) opened for services on November 7, 1875, and was formally consecrated by Bishop William Bacon Stevens on December 14, 1875. The remainder of Currie's rectorship was plagued with a declining membership and financial problems. The church lacked an endowment and relied upon its wealthier members to fund special projects, repairs, and its music program. As these members moved to other sections of Philadelphia, St. Luke's could not rely on its traditional sources of support. Under these circumstances, Currie resigned on March 10, 1887, and accepted the rectorship of Christ Church, Baltimore, MD. Currie and his family maintained their ties to St. Luke's after they left Philadelphia. In 1913, his family donated the Christ with Nicodemus stained glass window in his honor. Currie even preached the sermon at its dedication. Further, several of Currie's grandchildren were married at St. Luke's.

The Rev. Dr. Currie's successor, the Rev. Leverett Bradley, rector of Christ Church, Andover, Massachusetts, was called in early 1888. Bradley's biographer described St. Luke's bleak situation this way "Old St. Luke’s parish...had very much run down. It was on a side street, and was the only downtown church without any endowment." Bradley understood the challenges he faced when he accepted the rectorship. He, almost immediately, dedicated himself and the church to the needs of the city's poor. He tirelessly worked with the Board of City Missions and St. Luke's responded by giving generously to the annual missions appeal. However, during a sojourn to Paris in 1894, Bradley concluded that its activities were hampered by the lack of an endowment. From 1894 onward, Bradley spent the remainder of his rectorship trying to secure the long-term viability of the parish. Early efforts were made to start building an endowment, made very difficult by the fact that "many of the wealthy families had left" before his arrival. Preliminary discussions had taken place between the vestries of St. Luke's, St. Stephen's, and Church of the Epiphany about a possible amalgam. These discussions did not progress very far, and no action was taken. It was only after a bout with typhoid fever in 1897, which left him severely weakened, did Bradley seriously entertain any ideas of a merger.

In the fall of 1897, the Rev. Mr. Bradley and Bishop Ozi W. Whittaker had extensive conversations about possible mergers or consolidations. Bishop Whittaker indicated that Church of The Epiphany, which was unable to find a suitable site for a new building, would consider merging with a parish if their rector would lead the combined parish. Bradley suggested that Church of The Epiphany’s vestry should contact St. Luke's vestry about a merger.

The vestry would not act until they received assurances from Bradley that he was satisfied with an arrangement whereby he would find himself in a subordinate position. Bradley assured the vestry the arrangement was satisfactory to him, for the merger with Church of The Epiphany fulfilled Bradley's goal of building an endowment for the church. Church of The Epiphany came with $575,000, of which $300,000 would go directly into an endowment account. Bradley would have a lifetime position, with the option of becoming senior rector if/when Epiphany's rector retired or resigned. In a moving sermon just before the pew-holders voted upon the merger on March 24, 1898, Bradley spoke movingly,

God seems to be leading us in a way we would avoid. There are all kinds of successes. Perhaps this seeming failure may be nearer God’s idea of success than we think. It is my conviction that by this time we should have had a sufficient endowment had not circumstances opposed our moving vigorously in the matter. I seem to see the hand of God, who may be purposing to engage us in larger and broader activities. Having trained our spirits to loyalty and love, He may now give us the material resources to make glad the hearts of many yet unborn.

The pew-holders voted overwhelmingly in favor of the merger. After a similar vote at Epiphany, the merger became effective on April 6, 1898, after which the combined congregation became known as The Church of St. Luke and The Epiphany.

The Church of The Epiphany, c. 1900

=== Church of The Epiphany (1834–1898) ===
The Church of The Epiphany was located on the northwest corner of 15th and Chestnut Streets in Philadelphia, Pennsylvania. It was founded in 1834 and merged with St. Luke's Church in 1898 after the sale of its property to Philadelphia merchant John Wanamaker in 1896.

=== Church of St. Luke and The Epiphany (1898 – present) ===
The merger of St. Luke's Church and The Church of The Epiphany was not without friction. The agreement of consolidation placed two individuals, each of whom had previously been rector for a part of the congregation, in positions of leadership in the new parish. The vestry recommended that Fr. Bradley take a year leave to give the Rev. Thomas A. Tidball a chance to assume the rectorship of the combined parish without interference. During Fr. Bradley's absence, Fr. Tidball began the task of stitching together a new parish. Almost immediately, renovations to the church were made to incorporate the organ from the Church of the Epiphany and changes were made to the chancel (see architecture section below). In May 1901, Fr. Bradley chose not to exercise his option to become rector emeritus and retire with full salary. Fr. Tidball abruptly resigned on November 6, 1902, effective January 1, 1903. The vestry gave Fr. Bradley 30 days to become either rector or rector emeritus. Given Fr. Bradley's declining health the only reasonable action was retirement as rector emeritus with full salary as of January 1, 1903. During the Christmas holiday, Fr. Bradley became very ill and died on December 31, 1902, at the age of 56. Early in 1904, the vestry organized a committee to develop a memorial to the Rev. Leverett Bradley, chaired by Philadelphia architect Frank Miles Day. Although Day did submit a design, the committee ultimately selected a memorial tablet designed by Philadelphia sculptor Charles Grafly. The tablet, which can be found in the sanctuary, was dedicated on December 31, 1905.

Church of St. Luke and The Epiphany view towards chancel on Christmas, 2010

In February 1904, the Rev. David McConnell Steele, assistant rector of St. Bartholomew's Church in New York City, was called as rector. Early in his rectorate, Steele realized that the area around the church was shifting from a neighborhood of single-family dwellings to one "thickly populated boarding house, apartment house, and hotel region of which [St. Luke's] is the centre." In response, Steele actively created programs to reach this transient population. For example, he restarted the church's magazine, called the Parish Helper. Started in 1887 and dormant since 1902, it was resurrected in 1906 as part church newsletter/ part religious magazine. Further, the church hosted various socials, dances, lectures, and other social events to reach this population. Various accounts in The Philadelphia Inquirer report that these events were well attended, with one New Year's Eve party counting over 1,500 guests in attendance. The success of these outreach activities can be seen in the confirmation registers. For example, in 1915, 50 people were confirmed at the Church of St. Luke and The Epiphany. Of the 50, only 6 were children or young people. The rest were converts from the various Protestant, Eastern Orthodox, and Roman Catholic traditions (a trend that has continued in this church to the present). Throughout the nineteen-teens and early nineteen-twenties, the confirmation classes ranged between 50 and 100 persons per year.

Although the neighborhood around the church was changing, St. Luke's pewholders were still from Philadelphia's upper-middle and upper classes. For example, Thomas Voorhees, President of the old Reading Railroad, Owen J. Roberts, future Supreme Court Justice, and Andrew C. and Mary B. Dulles, parents of the infamous RMS Titanic disaster, a victim William Crothers Dulles, were all pew holders. In most cases, the pewholders had since moved out of the immediate area around the church. However, these families remained committed to the work of the parish. They contributed greatly to the enhancement of the church, for example, by donating the stained glass windows in the gallery in 1912, and to the church's endowment, through planned giving. The wealthy members, mainly the wealthy women, of the church instituted several charity missions during Steele's tenure, including oil and ice deliveries for the needy of the neighborhood. Their contributions even allowed the church to purchase a farm in Delaware County, near Broomall, where the congregation could retire on weekends or during the summer for social activities and outdoor chapel.

The Rev. Dr. Steele was a prolific author and noted lecturer. By the end of his tenure he was widely known and well regarded within the Episcopal Church for his liberal views. Steele spoke out against the Pennsylvania blue laws and was an active supporter of the repeal of the "Eighteenth Amendment" to the U.S. Constitution for the Prohibition of alcohol.

As the 1920s wore on, the change in the neighborhood began to take its toll as attendance and participation at the church started to dip noticeably. Steele saw this as a personal affront. He felt he was losing or had already lost the support of the congregation; further, Steele felt the vestry was not doing enough missions work and outreach. For these reasons, he tended his resignation to the vestry on January 8, 1929. The vestry promptly tabled Steele's resignation and then voted instead to increase the church's mission work.

St. Luke and The Epiphany was hit hard during the early years of the "Great Depression" in the 1930s. Its noted music program was the first budget item to be trimmed. For example, the choir master's salary was reduced from $8,500 to $6,500. By January 1933, Steele had enough. After 30 years, he resigned from his rectorship on January 15, 1933. As reported in The New York Times, "Because of the population drift away from the center of the city, where his church is located, and congregations in that area had been losing membership steadily. He wished to ‘step to one side and allow any other man, if such there be, to build a congregation with a better attendance."

Steele remained connected to the Church of St. Luke and The Epiphany after his retirement; the vestry granted him the title Rector Emeritus with an accompanying salary. The congregation fondly remembered the Rev. David Steele; his rectorship marked the moment when the two consolidated parishes truly became one. The congregation remembered his contributions in the form of a plaque, which was placed in the sanctuary in 1946.

In less than two months after Steele announced his retirement, informal discussions began concerning a merger with the Church of the Holy Trinity. Discussions progressed rapidly, and by late April the question of merger was put before both congregations. The combined parish would be known as The Churches of the Holy Trinity and Saint Luke and the Epiphany. The proposal, which was supported by both vestries, was put forth to the congregations. The Church of the Holy Trinity overwhelmingly supported the merger. However the proposal was overwhelmingly defeated by the congregants of the Church of St. Luke and The Epiphany.

Rev. Thomas L. Harris came to St. Luke's in 1933 as a supply priest at first to fill the vacancy left by Dr. Steele's retirement. After one year, the vestry decided to elect him rector on May 3, 1934. He selected the Rev. Nelson Waite Rightmyer as his curate; both were quite young compared to the aging pew holding congregation. He began his ministry at the height of the "Great Depression" and was deeply committed to social ministry and the needs and issues of the people of the neighborhood. His determination to include them in the life of the Church was not welcomed by the more socially prominent members of the congregation. Harris was active within a group of young theologians who saw their call to ministry through a lens of social justice. Together, they made several attempts to provide for the needs of the deteriorating neighborhood, including a possible merger with St. James Church, an Episcopal parish once located at 22nd and Walnut Streets, to form a church-based community center in 1935, as well as a partnership with the city's Social Services Department.

Additionally, services had remained relatively static at St. Luke's during David McConnell Steele's 30 years as rector. While many other congregations in the Episcopal Church in the U.S.A. were embracing more Anglo-Catholic liturgical elements, St. Luke's resisted. A few attempts by Harris to change the musical program were resisted as well. With mounting resistance from the Vestry and pew holding congregation, he recognized he had become alienated from the congregation and submitted this resignation in 1938 with the recommendation that the church merge with another parish or close. While there were still a number of people attending the church there was no deep loyalty to it as demonstrated by a poll to determine its future. Out of 250 votes cast, 120 indicated no preference on whether the church should close, merge, or remain independent. Mr. Rightmyer, the curate, resigned shortly thereafter.

The Rev. Dr. Joseph Fort Newton, former co-rector of St. James' Church in Philadelphia, was elected as rector on February 11, 1938. The Rev. Dr. Newton faced the task of, as termed in his autobiography, "remaking a church." The issues which the Church of St. Luke and The Epiphany faced in the 1930s, were not unlike those faced by the stately "downtown" churches across the country. They were faced with declining resources and congregations. Newton shepherded the congregation through this transition in two ways. First, "in every way possible, [he] tried to make a church of free and tolerant faith, of friendly spirit and homey atmosphere. Our congregation grew, people coming from a distance, many who had been alienated from the church returned." Second, the church's finances stabilized. The church benefited from several generous contributions and from the sale of the church farm in Broomall, Delaware County, replenished an endowment decimated during the Great Depression. Newton was noted for his great preaching ability. In 1939, for example, he was voted one of the five foremost Protestant clergymen in America. He was also a prolific writer. Newton authored more than thirty books and published a popular weekly column in the afternoon paper "Philadelphia Bulletin", which had the largest circulation in the city. Dr. Newton died on January 24, 1950.

The Rev. Dr. Walter M. Haushalter was elected rector on March 24, 1950. Haushalter was a seasoned clergyman, having been ordained in the Congregational Church some years before. However, he had recently been ordained in the Episcopal Church, and the Church of St. Luke and The Epiphany was his first and only rectorate as an Episcopal clergyman. Many of the older members, who had contributed generously to the church, had died or moved to the suburbs. In 1960, the topic of merger arose again. Bishop Oliver J. Hart suggested to Haushalter that a committee be formed, once again, to consider a merger with the Church of the Holy Trinity. Discussions were held; however, St. Luke and the Epiphany was not interested in any merger. Haushalter died while traveling in France on August 28, 1963.

The Rev. Frederick R. Isacksen was elected rector on October 23, 1963. In 1965, the vestry purchased a rectory on South Camac Street. It was the first time since the nineteen-teens (the Rev. Dr. Steele) that a rector had lived in the neighborhood, and since the mid-1940s (the Rev. Dr. Newton) that a rector had lived within the Philadelphia city limits. The purchase of the rectory was an outward symbol of the parish's commitment to the neighborhood and the city. In February 1969, Isacksen proposed that the church build a senior housing development at the corner of 13th and Pine Streets with assistance from the federal government. He believed this would establish a base of parishioners for the church. Properties were acquired, and substantial sums were spent on project planning. After Isacksen's retirement in 1975, the project was abandoned when the HUD grant was denied, resulting in significant losses to the Church.

In searching for Isacksen's successor, the parish had two major requirements. First, the new rector had to be young (in his mid-to-late thirties), and second, be married and have children. The church hoped that having a young rector with a family would attract similar people back to the parish. These requirements were filled by the Rev. John Edward Bird, Jr., curate of Christ Episcopal Church, Woodbury, NJ. He was elected rector on May 12, 1975.

The Rev. Rodger C. Broadley, the Church responded very quickly to the onset of the HIV/AIDS crisis in the early 1980s. Given the church's central location in Philadelphia's "Gayborhood" and the Episcopal Church's open funeral policy, St. Luke and The Epiphany was the site for many of the funerals for Philadelphia's early HIV/AIDS victims. As part of the church's response to the AIDS crisis, St. Luke and The Epiphany opened The Hospitality Center in 1989 under the direction of Sister Kathleen Snyder. The Hospitality Center was one of the earliest multi-faceted support structures for people living with the disease and their caregivers. The Hospitality Center gradually scaled back its services as new treatments improved the lives of those living with the illness during the 2000s, and it finally ended all of its programming in 2020.

During this time of turbulence in the wider neighborhood, Broadley opened the Church's doors to other community organizations, such as "Philadelphia FIGHT" and "ACT UP", who were not able to secure other safe places to meet and organize. Other community, secular, and arts organizations that use the building presently include Alcoholics Anonymous and Dignity USA. Other missions of the Church include support for neighbor Mercy Hospice, a faith-based transitional shelter for women, visibility at community events, Bible fellowship, and various service activities in Philadelphia. Members of the parish have participated in every AIDS Walk in Philadelphia since its inception; the Rev. Ms. Haines has, for many years, read the names of AIDS victims and given the benediction at the beginning of the event. The congregation maintains missionary connections to the wider world, supporting Millennium Development Goals through the Episcopal Relief and Development Fund and Fikelela, a parish-based HIV/AIDS clinic in South Africa.

== Architecture ==
Church of St. Luke and The Epiphany view towards chancel, Easter 2011.

=== Church ===
The church is listed on the Philadelphia Register of Historic Places (1961) and in the Historic American Buildings Survey of the Library of Congress (PA-1499). The two-story structure is constructed of stuccoed stone and brick and measures approximately 65 feet by 130 feet with gabled roof. The entire building is raised on a pedestal above the surrounding neighborhood. Neoclassical granite steps from Quincy, Massachusetts, lead up to the entrance of the Church. A cast-iron fence featuring Greek Revival motifs encloses the property along the street. The six-bay portico features wooden column shafts topped with richly articulated cast iron capitals in the Greek Corinthian order of the Choragic Monument of Lysicrates, an ancient monument in Athens. The twin monumental front doors and flanking windows have corbeled lintels. The interior of the church is organized around a three-aisle plan with second story self-supporting gallery. Pilasters with capitals finished in gold leaf around the perimeter are based on a Greek-style adaptation by the New York architect Minard Lafever and published in his pattern book, The Beauties of Modern Architecture (1835). Free standing columns in the chancel employ the same Greek Corinthian order as the front portico.

The church was designed by Philadelphia architect Thomas Somerville Stewart; it is acclaimed as one of the finest examples of Greek Revival architecture surviving in the city. The site was selected after other locations at Broad and Locust Streets and 13th and Spruce Streets were rejected because of cost. The present site of the church was acquired for $15,000. The cornerstone was laid on May 24, 1839, by Bishop Henry Ustick Onderdonk, and it was opened for services on October 18, 1840.

Stewart's design was chosen over six other plans submitted by several prominent architects, including William Strickland and John Notman. The original design included a 200-foot-high steeple over the portico, however, the church was unable to raise through subscription the full cost of $7,000 and it was not built. A contract was approved to build the Church for $30,000 plus $200 for the self-supporting gallery.

The Philadelphia Public Ledger reported at the time: "The interior is exceedingly beautiful and chaste. Without pretending to give a detailed description, we state that above the floor every thing, even to the glass of the windows, is of a pure white, and in every section of the church is introduced the richest and most elaborate carving and molding in wood and plaster. Even the organ is of this color and in this style. It is praised as a superb instrument. The pews are represented as of oak and the damask covering them is of a corresponding color. The effect is remarkably fine."

The chancel has undergone the most dramatic changes over the years. Originally, it was only eight feet deep and a semi-circular platform extended into the body of the church. It had a raised central pulpit behind a reading desk and communion table.

In 1853 the chancel was torn down and a new one built in the current shape. The platform extending into the church was removed and ten new pews added. A richly carved elevated pulpit was built to one side and a lectern placed on the other. Carved wooden benches for clergy were built on the sides and an altar placed against the rear wall. An altar rail was also added at that time. On the walls above were inscribed the Ten Commandments and the Creed. The central circle in the ceiling was painted glass lit from windows above. It has since been plastered over. In 1890 and 1891 the current brass pulpit and lectern replaced the previous wood ones.

With the merger with the Church of The Epiphany in 1898, the organ from Epiphany was installed in the chancel. Until 1925 when the current Austin organ was installed, the church had two organs, the original in the gallery and the chancel organ.

In 1899, the chancel was once again extended into the body of the church and the first two rows of pews in the center aisle were removed. The renovation of 1906 by Wilson Eyre Jr. achieved the current look of the chancel; the tile floor and choir stalls were installed at that time, as well as an enlarged narthex with new doors and windows. The reredos mosaic of St. Luke and those of the symbols of The Epiphany were installed in the chancel over the tablets of the creed and Ten Commandments. They were designed by Sawyer and Flintoff and added in 1912.

In keeping with contemporary liturgical trends, the altar was moved away from the wall and placed in its current position in 1976. David d'Ambly's polychromed cross was also added simultaneously above the altar.

The stained glass windows on the main floor were added gradually between 1876 and 1899. Those in the gallery representing the Apostles were designed by the Philadelphia studio of Alfred Godwin & Co., located at 1324 Market Street, and were installed in 1912. Each window was placed in memory of a former parishioner. The total cost of the 10 windows was $3,000. The windows were restored by Willet Studios in 1983.

The baptismal font, now located in the narthex, was first placed in front of the steps to the chancel. It was given to the church in 1856 by George L. Harrison, a prominent businessman and vestryman for many years. The lady chapel to the north of the chancel was built as a baptistery with a bequest from Asa Whitney, and the font was moved there in 1876. It was moved to its current location in 1976.

For many years, the exterior of the building was painted a dull brown to look like brownstone. It was briefly painted a light gray, accented with polychrome capitals in the mid-1930s, before being changed back. The church has been painted white since the late 1960s. The garden between the church and parish house replaced a patio in 1965.

In 2009, the church completed its largest maintenance project in generations, removing the roof to install 50 new trusses and a new electrical system, then installing a new roof and painting the entire structure's exterior. It was the culmination of a decade of maintenance projects that grew out of a comprehensive building assessment commissioned by the vestry in 2002. That assessment revealed the need for several small projects and uncovered dangerous failures of the original trusses that held up the roof and ceiling and spanned 62 feet from the north wall to the south wall, the largest clear-span timber roof remaining in the city. Armed only with that assessment and rough estimates for the project, the vestry and clergy hired a fund-raising consultant and rallied a team to spearhead the first capital campaign in decades. After several years of planning and preparing, in September 2007, the church launched a campaign titled "Preserving Our Past/Building Our Future." Over three months of intense, one-on-one meetings with parishioners and regular updates during services, the campaign generated $500,000 in three-year pledges from the congregation. In early 2008, the vestry put out a call for proposals and began interviewing some of the best church architects in the country, eventually hiring Philadelphia-based DPK&A Architects and its team of structural and electrical engineers headed by preservation architect Clive Copping. In the summer of 2008, the team came up with a proposal to reinforce the existing 10 trusses and replace the roof at a cost of $2.6 million. That proposal, more than three times the original estimate of $750,000, was rejected by the vestry. The designers were ordered back to the drawing board. They brought in a contractor, J.S. Cornell and Sons of Philadelphia, to help find a less costly alternative. By the end of that summer, the designers crafted a plan to entirely remove the roof and lower into place 50 prefabricated lightweight wood trusses. That plan had an estimated cost of $1.6 million. The vestry took out a mortgage to fund the balance of the cost, and work commenced in May 2009. With strict oversight and cost incentives crafted by the vestry, the work came in more than $300,000 under the estimate and was completed by October 2009. In 2009, the project was recognized by the Preservation Alliance of Greater Philadelphia with a Grand Jury Award.

St. Paul's Episcopal Church in Richmond, Virginia, designed by Stewart several years later, is largely based on his designs for St. Luke's Church. Notable similarities include the design of the church envelope, interior organization, ventilation system, and decorative elements. In St. Paul's, one can see what St. Luke's might have looked like had the steeple been built.

=== The Furness addition ===
The chapel and parish house on the south side of the church was designed by Furness & Hewitt and was built in 1875 with a donation from George L. Harrison, a warden on the vestry. The addition is two stories, with a partial basement. The facade is divided horizontally by a string course, wall surfaces below the string course appear like rusticated stone construction, while those above are finished in a smooth plaster. There are several fenestrated projections on the second floor overlooking the interior courtyard and street.

The addition is organized around a monumental stair hall of a very fine marble, with administrative spaces to one side and public spaces to another. The chapel runs the width of the addition with a clear span, supported by steel tension rods visible at the ceiling. The interior elevations of the chapel are divided into equal bays by high pilasters, six bays wide by eight bays long. The pilaster capitals feature exaggerated organic detailing characteristic of the work from Furness's office. Separated by the pilasters are leaded glass clerestory windows with a geometric pattern, and the ratios of the divided lights relate to the dimension of the window as a whole. The walls are detailed in plaster to give a paneled look reminiscent of rusticated stone construction and are painted in colors characteristic of the Victorian era, such as sage green and maroon. As the space is constructed with a clear span, the ceiling is vaulted with a large skylight at its apex and is painted a deep blue and accented with gold-painted stars. There is not any fixed furniture, with the exception of a small dark-stained wood altar against the north wall. The chapel has its own small pipe organ for musical accompaniment; it is lively acoustically. Originally, the wall to the church was removed, and pews placed in the chapel extending into the Church. The wall was replaced in 1891 when an addition was added to accommodate the Sunday Schools. The chapel still communicates with the church via a large double door.

Today, the addition houses the parish office, hall, and kitchen on the first and basement floors, as well as the rector's office, vestry room, chapel, and choir room on the second floor.

== Music ==
=== Choir ===
St. Luke's Church was the first in Philadelphia to employ a professional, vested choir. At its height before World War One, the choir was well regarded in the city as one of the best, counting approximately 40 choristers among its ranks. At various times in the past, the choir has been accompanied by the Philadelphia Orchestra. The Church continues this tradition of choral excellence, employing approximately four to six choristers, along with parisioner volunteers, during the Church program year (September through July).

=== Organs ===
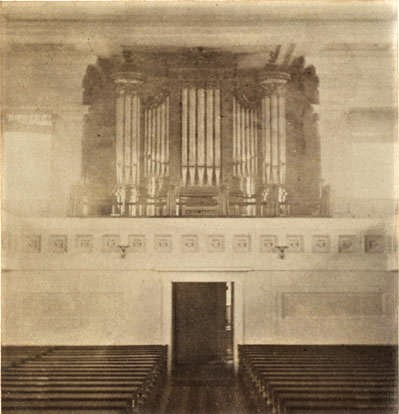
St. Luke's Church interior, c.1868, view towards gallery and organ.

The first organ for St. Luke's Church was built in 1840 by E. and G.G. Hook of Boston and is located in the gallery at the rear of the Church. It had 3 manuals (keyboards) and pedals. The full organ comprised 29 1/2 stops and 1,552 pipes; at that time, it was noted to be one of the best church organs in Philadelphia. It was well received by visiting organists of the city.

Later, the organ showed signs of unreliability and was eventually replaced in 1877. The new organ was again built by E. and G.G. Hook & Hastings of Boston. The older Hook organ was traded in as part of the payment towards the new organ, as well as some of the pipework used in the new organ. The second Hook organ was larger, with 51 stops.

At the merger, the two organs were connected together by an up-and-coming organ builder, Ernest M. Skinner of Boston. In 1907, he installed a console in the chancel to play the Hook & Hastings in the back gallery and the Church of the Epiphany's organ built by George Jardine of New York City in 1882 that had been placed in a large chamber on the left side of the chancel. The console controlled 88 ranks of pipes from both organs.

During the tenure of Dr. Steele, rector, and H. Alexander Matthews, organist-choirmaster, the church purchased a new pipe organ, which was installed in 1925. The organ was built by the Austin Organ Co. of Hartford, CT. At the time of its installation, it was considered among the city's finest. The Austin organ was completely installed in the front of the church. An upper pipe loft was added above the lady chapel to accommodate more pipes as part of this installation. The Austin organ served the church longer than any other. When the Austin was built, the romantic era of organ building was in its prime; its tone was dark and rich with various beautiful orchestral stops. It was also when most organists were playing orchestral and operatic music transcriptions. To play organ music such as Bach, Buxtehude and other Baroque composers, it sounded muddy.

In the early to mid-1990s, the Church felt it was time to do something about the Austin organ. Some wanted to restore it, others wanted to replace it with an electronic substitute, and still others favored rebuilding and enlarging it. Rebuilding and enlargement was the decided route.

Currently, the organ has all of its Austin windchests, mechanicals, etc. During the tenure of Jonathan Bowen, current organist-choirmaster, the organ has been transformed into an instrument that is able to play organ music from just about any period. Its primary function is to play service music, particularly in the Anglican style. Many of the ranks (sets) of pipes have been replaced to achieve this sound. Digitally sampled stops by Walker Technical Co. were also added at the time of the rebuild in 1998.

Despite space and funding limitations at the time of the rebuild, The Church of St. Luke and The Epiphany now has an organ that serves the needs of the parish and the community. The parish has always had great choral, orchestral, and chamber music ensembles using the space for performance. It is now currently the second-largest church organ in Philadelphia. The total count of pipe and digital ranks currently stands at 150. A full list of current and past stops may be found on the Music page of the Church's website.

=== Organists/choirmasters ===
St. Luke's Church (1839–1898)

- William Henry Westray Darley (1840–1872)
- George Fitz-Curwood Lejeune (1873-1875)
- Oscar A. Knipe (1875–1880)
- Lewis Leaming Forman (1881–1885)
- Dr. Carl H. Reed (1886-1890)
- Stanley Addicks (1890–1896)
- _____ Goeff (1890s)

Church of St. Luke and The Epiphany (1898 – present)

- Joseph Spencer Brock (1899-1904) - Choirmaster
- James M. Dickinson (1899-1904) - Organist
- Franklin Whitman Robinson (1904–1917)
- Harry Alexander Matthews (1917–1937)
- Harry Banks (1937–1946)
- Clarence K. Bawden (1946–1971)
- Frances S.Jerome (1971–1983)
- William J. Gatens (1983–1991)
- Jonathan M. Bowen (1991 – present)

== Leadership ==
=== Vestry ===
The current vestry is composed of 12 members of the congregation. Each is elected to a three-year term, and since the 1970s, each vestry member has been limited to serving two consecutive terms. Supreme Court Justice Owen J. Roberts served on the Vestry in the 1920s.

=== Rectors ===
In the Episcopal Church in the United States of America, the rector is the priest elected to head a self-supporting parish.

St. Luke's Church (1839–1898)

- The Rev. William Spear, D.D. (1840–1845)
- The Rev. Mark Antony DeWolfe Howe, S.T.D., D.D., LL.D. (1845–1871)
- The Rev. Charles George Currie, D.D. (1872–1887)
- The Rev. Leverett Bradley (1888–1898)

Church of St. Luke and The Epiphany (1898 – present)

- The Rev. Dr. Thomas Allen Tidball (1898–1903)
- The Rev. Dr. David M. Steele (1904–1933)
- The Rev. Thomas Leonard Harris (1934–1938)
- The Rev. Dr. Joseph Fort Newton (1938–1950)
- The Rev. Dr. Walter M. Haushalter (1950–1963)
- The Rev. Frederick R. Isacksen (1963–1975)
- The Rev. John E. Bird, Jr. (1975–1982)
- The Rev. Rodger C. Broadley (1984 – 2020)
- The Rev. Joseph Wallace-Williams (2021–2024)

=== Assistants ===
St. Luke's Church (1839–1898)

- The Rev. Dr. Frederic Gardiner (1847–1848) Assistant Rector
- The Rev. Daniel Washburn (1848–1849) Assistant Rector
- The Rev. John Kemper Murphy (1849–1852) Assistant Rector
- The Rev. Edmund Roberts (1852–1853) Assistant Rector
- The Rev. J. A. Stone (1853–1854) Assistant Rector
- The Rev. Dr. John A. Childs (1854–1859) Assistant Rector
- The Rev. William Hobart Hare (1859–1861) Assistant Rector
- The Rev. James De Wolf Perry (1861–1863) Assistant Rector
- The Rev. John Woart (1864–1865) Assistant Rector
- The Rev. Morrison (1866) Assistant Rector
- The Rev. F. W. Winslow (1866–1867) Assistant Rector
- The Rev. William McGlathery (1867–1868) Assistant Rector
- The Rev. Reginald Heber Howe (1868–1869) Assistant Rector
- The Rev. James W. Saul (1869–1870) Assistant Rector
- The Rev. Alfred Louderback (1870–1872) Assistant Rector
- The Rev. Algernon Morton (1872) Assistant in Charge, (1872–1873) Assistant Rector
- The Rev. William Bower (1874–1875) Assistant Rector
- The Rev. Alfred Louderback (1875–1877) Assistant Rector
- The Rev. Richard N. Thomas (1878–1879) Assistant Rector
- The Rev. W. G. Ware (1880–1882) Assistant Rector
- The Rev. George E. D. Mortimer (1882–1884) Assistant Rector
- The Rev. Martin Aigner (1884–1890) Assistant Rector
- The Rev. Alden L. Bennett (1890–1893) Assistant Rector
- The Rev. William Bower (1893–1898) Assistant Rector

Church of St. Luke and The Epiphany (1898 – present)

- The Rev. Leverett Bradley (1898–1902) Associate Rector
- The Rev. William Bower (1898–1904) Assistant Rector
- The Rev. Philip Justice Steinmetz Jr. (1904–1906)
- The Rev. Dr. John Hendrik de Vries (1906–1907)
- The Rev. Henry C. Stone (1907–1910) Assistant Rector
- The Rev. Oliver W. De Venish (1911–1912)
- The Rev. Charles Lewis Biggs (1912–1915) Curate
- The Rev. Dr. Gabriel Farrell Jr. (1916–1917)
- The Rev. Granville Taylor (1917–1919)
- The Rev. Addison Alvord Ewing (1919–1922)Curate
- The Rev. W. Arthur Warner (1923–1934) Curate
- The Rev. Dr. Nelson Rightmyer (1934–1938) Curate
- The Rev. Thomas A. Merryweather (1944-1946)Assistant Rector
- The Rev. Frederick R. Isacksen (1946–1949) Assistant Rector
- The Rev. Dr. Percy R. Stockman (1960–1968) Part-time Assistant Rector
- The Rev. J. Aubrey Craig (1968-1974) Part-time Assistant Rector
- The Rev. Malcolm McGuire (1970–1971) Part-time Curate
- The Rev. Robert S. Harris (1971–1995) Part-time Assistant Rector
- The Rev. James Lloyd (1977–1980) Curate
- The Rev. Rodger C. Broadley (1980–1983) Curate
- The Rev. Marlene Haines (1998–2011) Associate Rector
- The Rev. Carol Anthony (2011–2014) Part-time Associate Rector

== Relationship with the Diocese ==
Due to the church's large capacity, ably handling over 1,000 people in one sitting, close proximity to Church House and the Philadelphia Divinity School for a number of years, and the congregation's social standing, the church has been host to many diocesan conventions, including 1858, 1865, 1870, 1887, 1888, 1890 through 1900, 1902 through 1910, 1912, 1915 through 1921, and 1979.

== Epiphany Chapel (1898–1918) ==
Epiphany Chapel at 17th and Winter Streets, from The Philadelphia Inquirer article Nov 13, 1899.

Epiphany Chapel was a mission of the Church of the Epiphany and later the consolidated parish. It was admitted to the Diocese of Pennsylvania convention in 1878 as a mission of the Church of the Epiphany. The chapel remained located at 23 and Cherry Streets until the 1898 merger.

At that time, the parish purchased the Church of the Atonement on the northeast corner of Schuylkill Avenue (now 17th Street) and Summer Street. That building had been built in 1847–48 to designs by noted architect Napoleon LeBrun. This Church of the Atonement was demolished to make way for a new three-building complex consisting of a chapel, Sunday school, and parish house arranged in a u-shape around a courtyard fronting on 17th Street, designed in Gothic Revival style by noted ecclesiastical architect Isaac Pursell, AIA, a former student of architect Samuel Sloan. The cornerstone was laid on November 18, 1898, by Bishop Whitaker, along with the Revs. Tidball and Michael in attendance. Original construction costs (including purchase of the property) totaled $75,000. By completion, costs had grown to $100,000.

The Philadelphia Inquirer described the building as a "handsome new chapel;" constructed from rough-faced gray granite with limestone for all details, tracery and interior structure. Interior surfaces are finished in cypress, including a vaulted and paneled hammer-beam roof. The pulpit and rood screen are of quartersawn oak; the altar is constructed of marble. Built to serve the growing neighborhood, the buildings housed a variety of services such as a bowling alley, bicycle room, shuffleboard and other game rooms, gymnasium, kitchen, and running track in the parish house, six small classrooms, and one large classroom in the Sunday school building, and room for 400 congregants in the chapel. A few years after the chapel's completion, a house on Summer Street was purchased for the vicar's residence.

The anticipated growth of the surrounding neighborhood never materialized, however, and in 1915 the vestry voted to sell the parish house and Sunday school buildings. The Orthopedic Hospital across the street purchased both buildings for approximately $40,000 for use as an outpatient facility. The sale was controversial as many in the parish believed there to be a real need for the entire mission and as a result, the vicar at that time, Rev. McGrew, resigned in protest. The parish house and Sunday school buildings have since been demolished.

Services at Epiphany Chapel ceased in October 1918. St. John Chrysostom, an Albanian Orthodox Church, began renting the building for services shortly thereafter, the congregation finally bought the chapel in 1946 for $22,500.

=== Vicars of Epiphany Chapel ===
A vicar in the Episcopal Church is usually the priest-in-charge of a mission of the parish.

- The Rev. Oscar Stewart Michael (1898–1899)
- The Rev. Gasherie De Witt Dowling (1899–1901)
- The Rev. Dr. Edward M. Hardcastle (1901–1904)
- The Rev. Frederick J. Walton (1904–1905)
- The Rev. H. St. Clair Hathaway (1905–1906)
- The Rev. Dr. Philip Justice Steinmetz Jr. (1906–1912)
- The Rev. Irving Angell McGrew (1913–1915)
- The Rev. W. Arthur Warner (1916–1918)

== St. Luke's Mission Chapel (1861–1867) ==
The Church of the Ascension, 1112–1118 Lombard Street, was designed by noted Philadelphia architect Thomas Ustick Walter for the Episcopal parish of All Souls in 1834. All Souls had just been organized the year before at 5th and Walnut Streets. Early in the construction, All Souls experienced serious financial difficulties, and in 1835 decided to unite with the emerging congregation of the Church of the Ascension. The prospects of the Church of the Ascension were very bright at first. However, with the construction of St Luke's much larger church a few blocks away and the area becoming popular with black families, it struggled along for many years beset by a lack of members and financial support. Instead of closing the parish, the vestry of St. Luke's voted to absorb Ascension as a mission chapel. Ascension was deeply indebted and its building required significant repairs. During the final year of St. Luke's administration, for example, $3000.00 was spent on building repairs and another $7000.00 to discharge the parish's debt ($3000.00 of which came directly from St. Luke's parishioners). These actions put the mission on stable footing, and the Rev. Dr. Howe and St. Luke's vestry jointly decided to dissolve the relationship in 1867. Although Ascension resumed as an independent parish, the parish was still confronted with many difficulties in making its way. Ascension moved to Broad and South Streets in 1886; the parish finally closed in 1946. The 11th and Lombard Street building was later sold to Shiloh Baptist Church. At present, the building is a part of the Washington Mews Condominium complex.

=== Vicars of St. Luke's Mission Chapel ===
- The Rev. Samuel Cox (1861–1862)
- The Rev. John A. Childs (1862–1864)
- The Rev. C. W. Duane (1864)
- The Rev. John Woart (1864–1867)

== Other church properties ==
- The St Luke's Church Home, located at 1317 Pine Street, was a charity for "aged women members of the Parish." The building was sold in 1911.
- Between 1873 and 1902, the rectory was located at 1217 Spruce Street. Between 1902 and 1966, the rectors received a housing allowance and could choose their own place of residence. The rectors typically chose to live in suburban Lower Merion Township, Montgomery County. The current rectory on Camac Street was purchased in December 1965.
- Brenz Farm, Broomall, PA. In 1920, the Church purchased 45 acres in suburban Delaware County to be used for spring and summer activities. The farm was sold in 1945 for $30,000.

== Publications ==
Many of the Rectors were well and widely published. Below is a select list, text for many may be found via Google Books.

- Bradley, Leverett. A Soldier Boy's Letters 1862–1865; A Man's Work in the Ministry; The Priesthood: A Sermon by Phillips Brooks. Boston: The Everett Press, 1905.
- Harris, Thomas Leonard. Christian Public Worship: Its History, Development and Ritual for To-day. New York: Doubleday, Doran & Company, Inc., 1928.
- Harris, Thomas Leonard. "Religion for a Scanty Band." Harper's Magazine: August 1933, 298–307.
- Harris, Thomas Leonard. Unholy Pilgrimage. New York: Round Table Press, 1937.
- Haushalter, Walter M. The Mystery of the Cross. Philadelphia: Dorrance, 1956.
- Haushalter, Walter M. The Crucifixion of Superiority. Philadelphia: Dorrance, 1967.
- Howe, Mark Anthony De Wolfe. Memoirs of the Life and Services of the Right Reverend Alonzo Potter, D. D., LL. D. Philadelphia: Lippincott, 1871.
- Isacksen, Frederick R. Healing Leaves. New York: Vantage, 1972.
- Newton, Joseph Fort. Living Every Day. New York: Harper & Brothers, 1937
- Newton, Joseph Fort. We Here Highly Resolve. New York: Harper & Brothers, 1939.
- Newton, Joseph Fort. Living Up to Life. New York: Harper & Brothers, 1941.
- Newton, Joseph Fort. His Cross and Ours. New York: Harper & Brothers, 1941.
- Newton, Joseph Fort. Live, Love and Learn: a little book about the great business of living. New York: Harper & Brothers, 1943.
- Newton, Joseph Fort. Where are we in Religion? New York: Macmillan, 1945.
- Newton, Joseph Fort. River of Years: An Autobiography. Philadelphia: Lippincott, 1946.
- Newton, Joseph Fort. The One Great Church: Adventures of Faith. New York: Macmillan, 1948.
- Newton, Joseph Fort. Everyday Religion. New York: Abingdon-Cokesbury, 1950.
- Spear, William W. Ministerial Devotedness, A Sermon Occasioned by the Death of Re. Daniel Cobia.Charleston: A. E. Miller, 1837.
- Spear, William W., ed. Cotterill's Family Prayers. Philadelphia: Herman Hooker, 1844.
- Steele, David McConnell. Going Abroad Overland: Studies of Places and People in the Far West. New York: Putnam, 1917.
- Steele, David McConnell. Vacation Journeys East and West. New York: Putnam, 1918.
- Steele, David McConnell. Papers and Essays for Churchman. Philadelphia: Jacobs, 1919.
- Steele, David McConnell. A Dozen After-Dinner Speeches. Philadelphia: Jacobs, 1920.
- Steele, David McConnell. Addresses and Sermons to Students. New York: Putnam, 1919.

== Gallery ==
Church of St. Luke

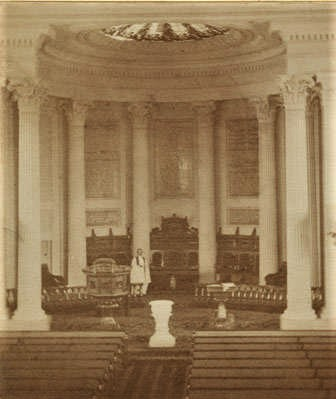
St. Luke's Church interior, view towards chancel. Rev. Howe standing in chancel in vestments, c.1868

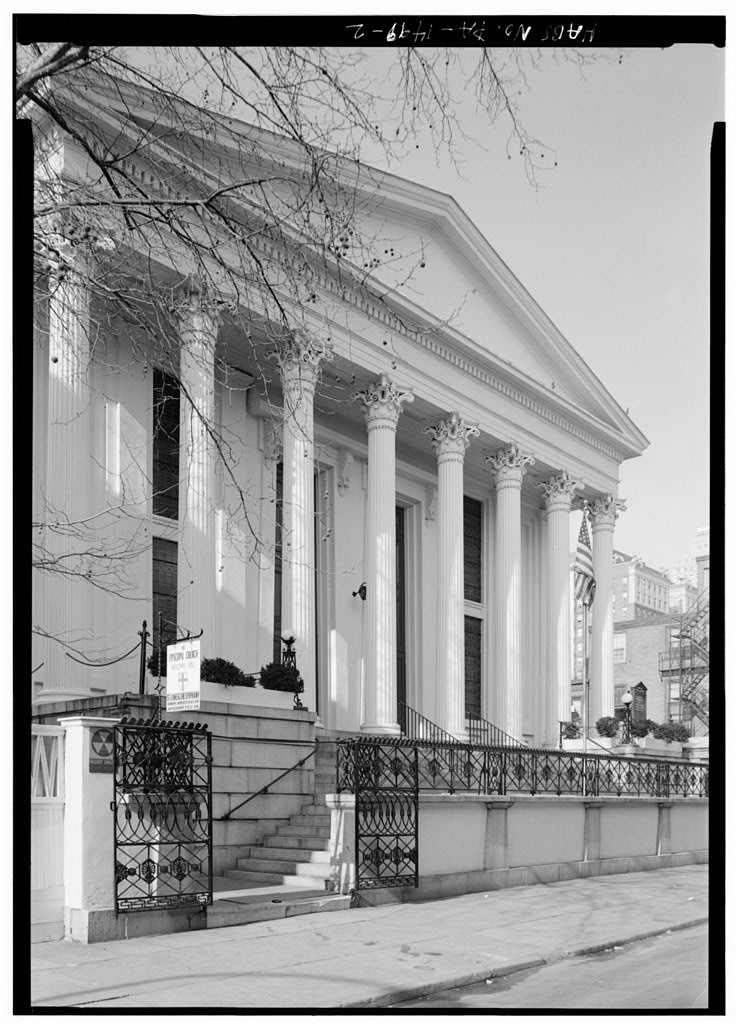
Church of St. Luke and The Epiphany facade looking north on 13th Street, 1974

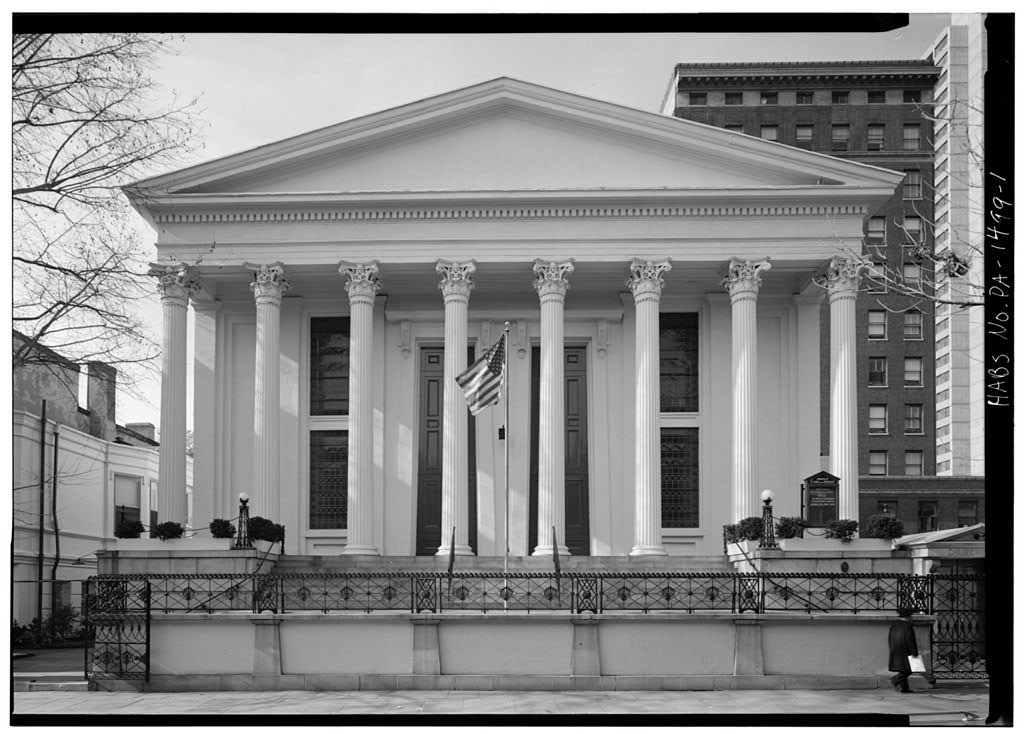
Church of St. Luke and The Epiphany facade, 1974

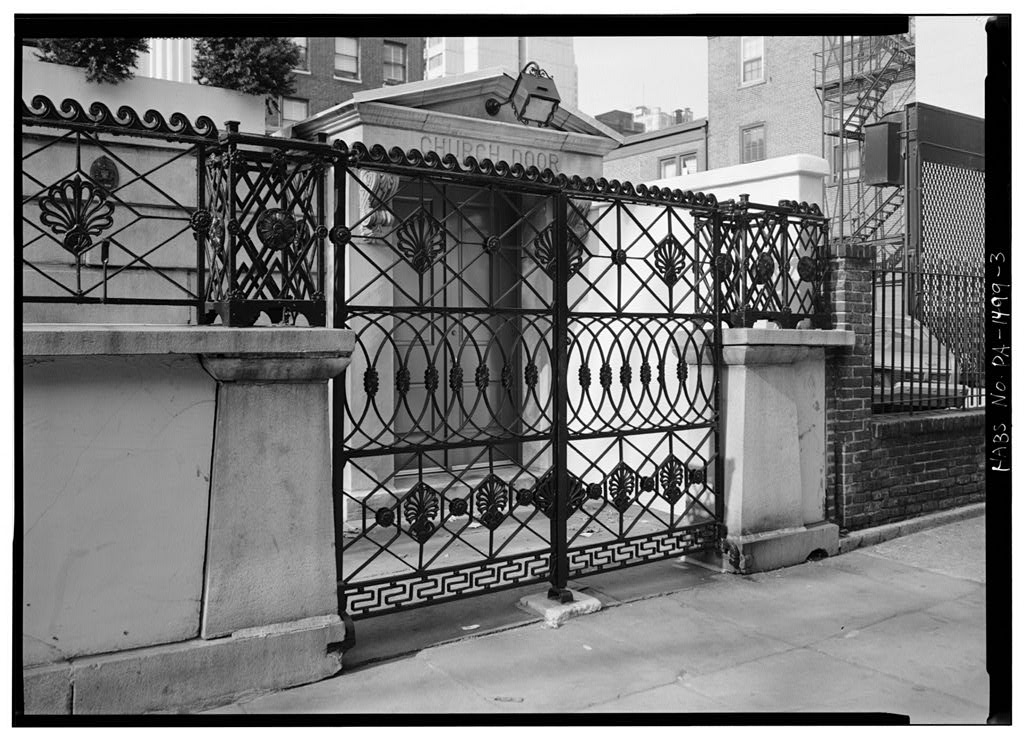
Gate of wrought iron fence, 1974
