= Thomas Somerville Stewart =

American architect

Thomas Somerville Stewart (1806 – May 3, 1889) was a Philadelphia-based architect, civil engineer, and real estate developer.

== Personal life ==
Thomas Somerville Stewart was born to a Scottish family living in Ireland (Scots-Irish), he immigrated to Philadelphia in 1818 to apprentice to his uncle, a carpenter. Later in life, he married Clara Eleanor Saurmein. They are buried together at Woodlands Cemetery, Philadelphia in Section L, Lot # 63. They had two sons, Thomas Somerville Stewart, Jr., M. D. and Ralph Chambers Stewart. Stewart was an Episcopalian and attended St. Luke's Church in Philadelphia until his death. He is memorialized there with a stained glass window on the north wall of the nave. A scholarship for students of architecture in Stewart's name was founded in 1901 by his wife and sons at the University of Pennsylvania.

In 1836, he ran for a position on the City Common Council and received 3,251 votes; an insufficient number to be qualified to hold office. Stewart was a member of the Board of Directors of Girard College for the term from 1856 to 1869. Additionally, he was a Director of the Fire Insurance Company of the State of Pennsylvania.

== Professional life ==
Stewart apprenticed as a carpenter under his uncle Thomas Stewart until his uncle's death in 1822. He continued his apprenticeship with John Guilder until 1827, staying in his employment as a journeyman until 1829. Stewart began his career building houses, taking advantage of the building boom occurring in Philadelphia at that time. He was able to buy up properties thanks to the inheritance he received from his uncle's estate. He began entering architectural competitions in the early 1830s, notably Girard College Founder's Hall and the Preston Retreat — he was bested in both instances by Thomas Ustick Walter. Stewart's first completed architectural commission was Pennsylvania Hall. An auspicious beginning to his career, it only stood three days before being burned to the ground by an anti-abolitionist mob.

Stewart's first prominent commission was St. Luke's Episcopal Church on 13th Street in Philadelphia. The competition came with a $100 prize for the winning entry. He won the competition with a corinthian design in the manner of the Choragic Monument of Lysicrates. The original design provided for a 200-foot-high steeple in the manner of St. Martin-in-the-Fields, although the lack of available funds precluded its construction. Upon the church's completion, the Philadelphia Public Ledger reported:

"The interior is exceedingly beautiful and chaste. Without pretending to give a detailed description, we state that above the floor every thing, even to the glass of the windows, is of a pure white, and in every section of the church is introduced the richest and most elaborate carving and molding in wood and plaster. Even the organ is of this color and in this style. It is praised as a superb instrument. The pews are represented as of oak and the damask covering them is of a corresponding color. The effect is remarkably fine."

Several years later, the building committee from St. Paul's Episcopal Church in Richmond was impressed enough with this church that they asked Stewart to design for them a church along the same lines. His work at St. Paul's led to his final large commission for the Egyptian Building for the Medical College of Richmond, now part of Virginia Commonwealth University, which is notable as one of the most famous Egyptian Revival buildings in the United States as well as being the oldest medical college building in the South. The Egyptian Building was added to the Virginia Landmarks Register in 1968, the National Register of Historic Places in 1969, and designated as a National Historic Landmark in 1971.

By the mid-1850s, Stewart was listed in city directories as an architect and civil engineer. Stewart was employed by the County of Philadelphia to design a bridge over the Schuyllkill River at Chestnut Street, resulting in the publication of two volumes, "Report on the designs for a malleable iron viaduct across the Schuylkill at Chestnut Street (1854)" and "Report on the tubular arch viaduct to be constructed of malleable iron, across the Schuylkill at Chestnut Street (1855)." The Philadelphia City Council Committee on Highways recommended the adoption of his design, yet it was never executed. Other references to his municipal work include an appointment by the Count Commissioners to inspect a municipal prison hospital in 1854 and surveying work in Passyunk after Philadelphia's consolidation.

He likely received his initial training at the Franklin Institute (joining as a life member in 1831), although rosters of the drawing class no longer survive for that period. As a member of the Franklin Institute, he served on the Committee on the Cabinet of Models and later on the Committees of the Library and Exhibitions. He was also a manager of the Institute. In 1868, he was a member of a committee of the Franklin Institute which evaluated the recent patent for a fireproof floor assembly which would now be considered "composite decking."

Stewart was admitted membership into the Athenaeum of Philadelphia in 1874.

== Building list ==
- 1833 - Girard College, Founder's Hall, Philadelphia, PA (unsuccessful competitor)
- 1834 - Joint Library, Philadelphia, PA (unsuccessful competitor; unbuilt)
- 1837 - Preston Retreat, Philadelphia, PA (unsuccessful competitor)
- 1838 - Pennsylvania Hall, Philadelphia, PA (destroyed by arson)
- 1840 - St. Luke's Church, Philadelphia, PA
- 1845 - St. Paul's Episcopal Church, Richmond, VA
- 1845 - Egyptian Building, Richmond, VA (originally commissioned for Hampden-Sydney College, now part of Virginia Commonwealth University)
- 1853 - St. Luke's Church, Chancel renovation, Philadelphia, PA
- 1854-55 - Bridge over the Schuylkill River at Chestnut Street, Philadelphia, PA (unbuilt)
- 1861 - St. Luke's Church, Chapel addition, Philadelphia, PA (unbuilt)

== Photographs ==
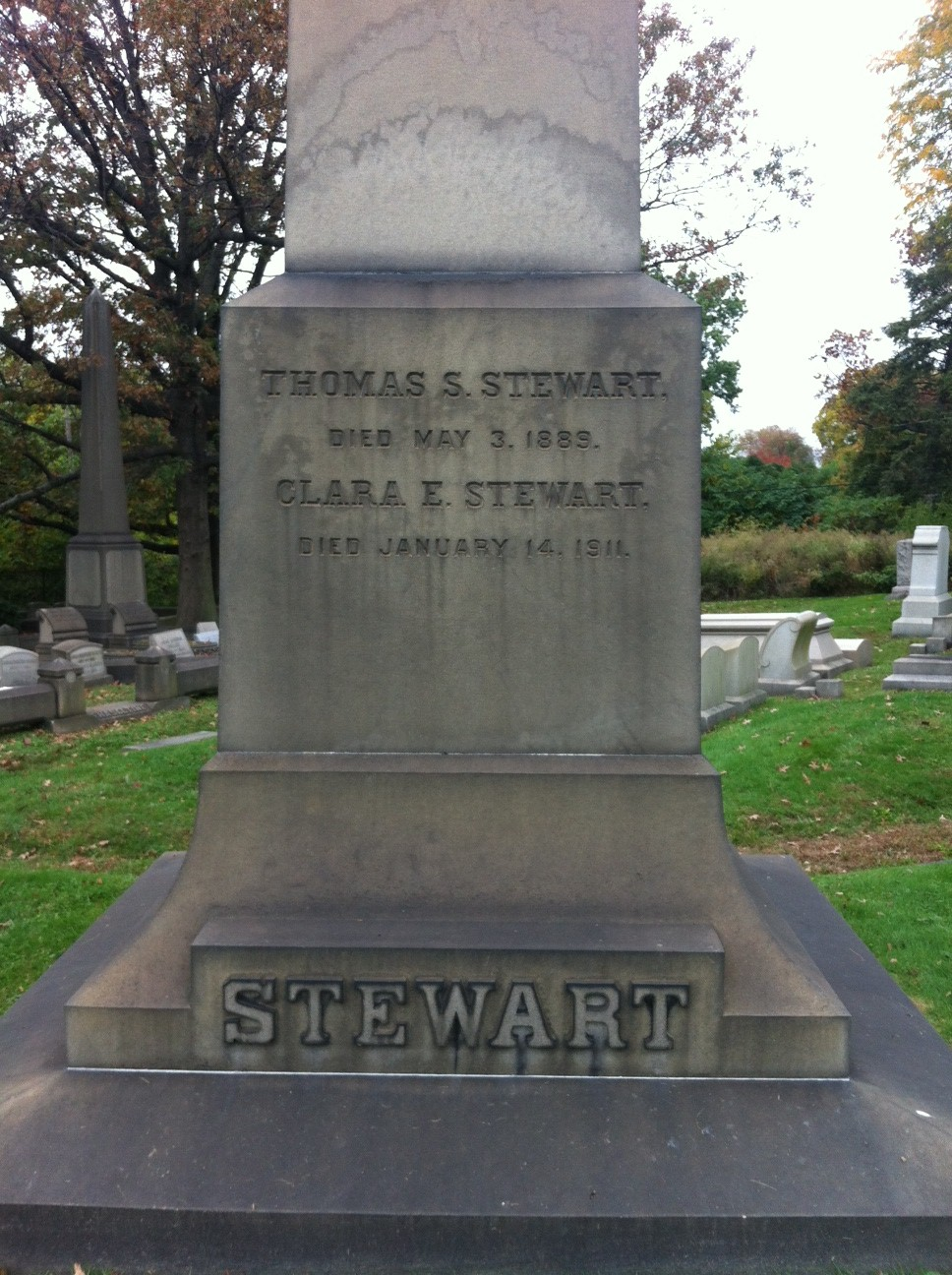
Obelisk headstone for Thomas and Clara Stewart at Woodlands Cemetery
