= Arthur Nash (businessman) =

American businessman (1870–1927)

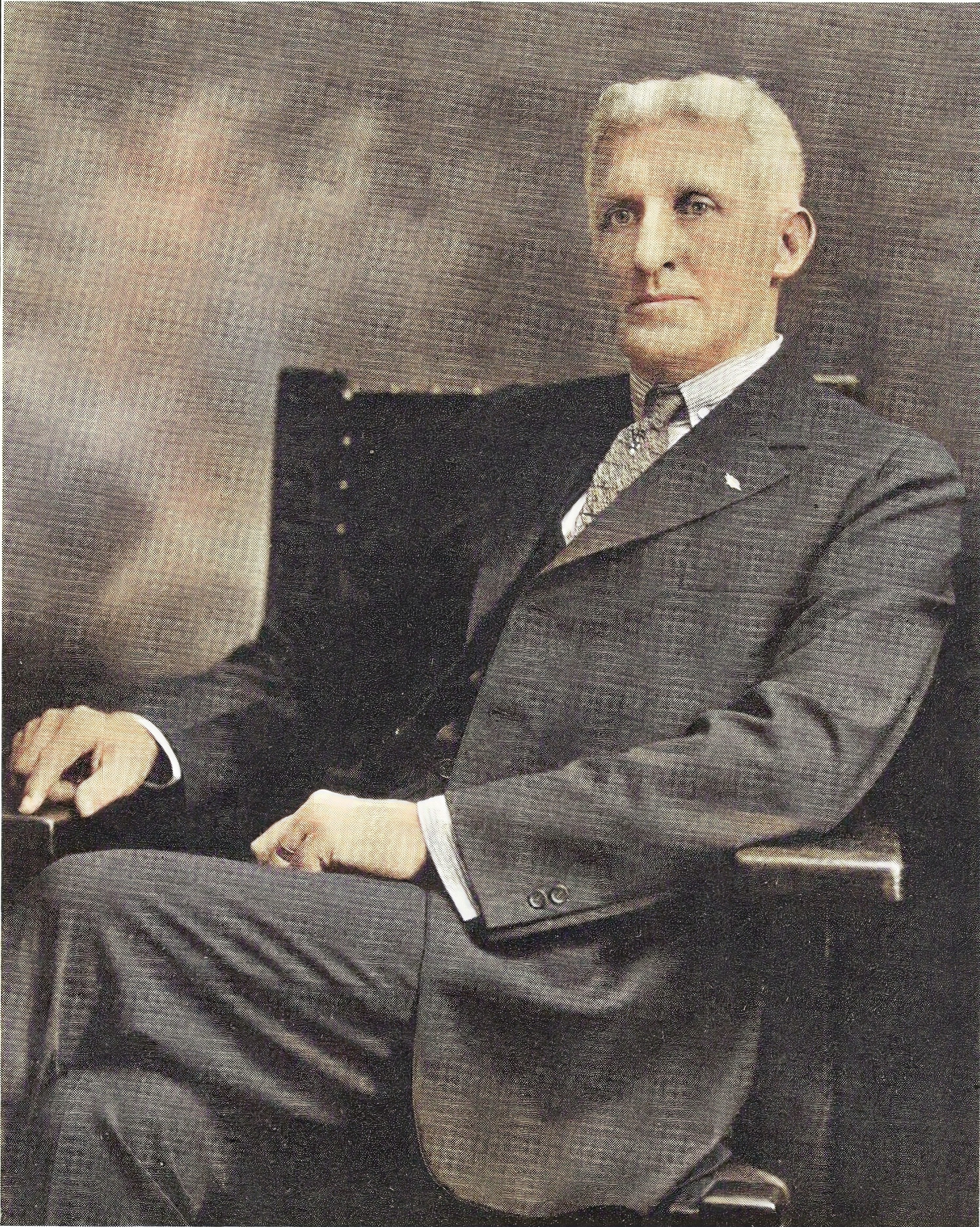
- Born: Arthur Nash; June 26, 1870; Tipton County, Indiana
- Died: October 30, 1927 (aged 57); Good Samaritan Hospital, Cincinnati, Ohio
- Resting place: Spring Grove Cemetery (LN, Sec 18, Lot 26, Sp 1)
- Occupations: Businessman, author, orator, lecturer
- Writing career
- Period: 20th century
- Genres: Autobiography, historical, social commentary
- Subjects: Business ethics, Christianity, Golden Rule, labor relations, race relations, religious tolerance, interfaith dialogue, sectarianism, war, peace
- Notable works: The Golden Rule in Business; The Nash Journal

Signature
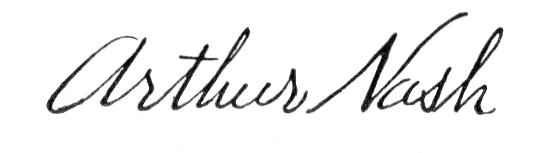

Arthur Nash (June 26, 1870 – October 30, 1927) was an American business man, author, and popular public speaker who achieved recognition in the 1920s when he determined to run his newly purchased sweatshop on the basis of the Golden Rule, and his business prospered beyond all expectation.

== Childhood and education ==
The eldest of nine children, Arthur Nash was born in 1870 in a log cabin on the Cloverleaf railroad, about five miles from Kokomo, in Tipton County, Indiana. His parents, Evermont "Mont" and Rachel Mitchell Nash, were strict Seventh-day Adventists, sending their son to religious school when he was thirteen years old. Nash graduated from high school at Greentown, Indiana, and then from the Adventist Theological Seminary in Battle Creek, Michigan. Ordained in 1894, he subsequently took a position as an instructor at the Adventist school for ministers and missionaries in Detroit.

Soon after he began teaching in Michigan, Nash befriended an elderly woman, Agnes "Mother" d'Arcambal, founder of The d'Arcambal Home of Industry for Discharged Prisoners, visiting her every week for eight or nine months. The elders of Nash's church informed him that d'Arcambal had rejected Adventist teachings years earlier. They pressed him to admit that according to Adventist doctrine which forbade Sunday worship, d'Arcambal, who had been holding Sunday services at the home, could not, therefore, be saved in death. Nash reacted by abandoning his faith, his family, and his religious ambitions, becoming a train hopping hobo, itinerant worker, and conflicted atheist.

== Early years ==
In his autobiography, The Golden Rule in Business, Nash wrote; "For four or five years I wandered about the Middle West, doing odd jobs here and there ... I never cared two straws which way a freight train was headed ... or what it was I did to keep body and soul together." He lugged bricks, did plastering work, labored in a broom factory, and with a bridge-construction gang—all the while studying Thomas Paine and Robert Ingersoll, endeavoring to bolster his contempt for religion. Eventually Nash found his way back to Detroit, where, with the help of some locals, he opened a laundry, and then married Y.W.C.A. boarding school superintendent, Maude Lena Southwell, calling her his "life partner." Described by Nash as being "possessed by a strong, robust faith," under Maude's influence, Nash came to view his arguments as being not against Christianity itself, but against its misinterpretation. He reentered the ministry with the Christian Church (Disciples of Christ), and in 1900, accepted the pastorate of a small church in Bluffton, Ohio. But Nash's rekindled career in religious work ended with "bewildering suddenness," when, in a funeral sermon, he extolled the many virtues of a kindhearted but professedly unreligious man, recently departed. The Disciples of Christ called for Nash's resignation forthwith.

=== Marriage and children ===
Married Elizabeth Carlston, June 25, 1894

- William Albert Nash, born January 9, 1890

Married Maude Lena Southwell, April 9, 1899

- Ralph M. Nash, born April 21, 1900
- Grace Nash Straehlev, born 1902

== Career ==
With a wife and three children to support, Nash was persuaded by a group of Chicago clothing salesmen to join their crew, and it soon became apparent that he made a better salesman than preacher. In 1909, he moved his family to Columbus, Ohio, and began manufacturing men's clothing to sell direct to the consumer. By 1913, Nash had a dozen outside salesmen in his employ, and had begun to show a profit, when the Great Flood of 1913 all but ruined him financially. He found security for a seven hundred dollar note he owed the bank, and obtained permission from his creditors to move his inventory.

In June 1916, with the United States positioning to enter World War I, the A. Nash Company was incorporated with a capital of sixty thousand dollars, and opened for business in Cincinnati's depressed garment and textile market. With an office, cutting room, but no working factory of his own, Nash supplied his customers with made-to-order men's suits by having the garments cut at his facility, and then contracting their manufacture to an Austrian man who leased floor space from Nash in the Power Building on East 8th Street.

=== Expanded description ===
In early 1917, with his son, William, already fighting with the Canadian Corps in France, Nash was approached by the pastor of the First Universalist Church in Cincinnati, and asked to fill in as preacher on a Sunday upcoming—the pastor stating he would select the subject for Nash's sermon. Having himself been challenged by Nash regarding Christianity's role in what Nash called, "the frightful carnage going on in Europe," the pastor asked Nash to go and talk to his people about what, in Nash's opinion, was the matter with Christianity. Just as he was preparing for his verbal "assault" on the Christian faith, Nash received word that William had been seriously wounded in the Battle of Vimy Ridge. When Nash's youngest son, Ralph, heard that his brother was, "hanging between life and death in a hospital in England," he immediately joined up with the Marines. His factory unequipped to handle government contracts, Nash became so discouraged that he almost closed up shop, spending most of his time selling Liberty bonds, and other war work. By the time the Armistice was signed, he had all but suspended business operations.

Distraught at having two sons involved in a war to which he viscerally objected, Nash experienced his darkest hour. Though he still thought himself an atheist, his mind harkened back to the teachings of his youth. In his own words: "Under great agony of soul I was finally driven to my knees, and there was torn from my heart perhaps the first real prayer that I had ever uttered. It was, 'O God, if there is a God, show me the way and I will walk in it.'" He reread the gospels—a text he had once virtually committed to memory—to gain a deeper understanding of "what it really was Jesus sought to establish, what to teach, [and] what, if anything, to condemn." Nash discovered that the Golden Rule governed Jesus' life and was the central theme to all of his teachings. He concluded that Jesus' "chief concern was the establishment of the principles of the kingdom of God on earth," through the application of the Golden Rule, as expressed in Matthew 7:12. This realization caused Nash to undergo a complete change of heart regarding the theme of his upcoming sermon. For more, see Philosophical and religious views.

=== Business takes off ===
==== The year 1919 ====
Shortly after the Armistice, which effectively ended the war, the Austrian, who wished to return to Europe and see to his mother, offered Nash the purchase of his small factory, which consisted of three or four tables, a few tools and machines, and twenty-nine workers. Nash agreed, and the transaction was completed at the beginning of 1919. Subsequently, and upon examination of his new business's payroll, he was "dumbfounded" to discover that he had bought a sweatshop." As he consulted his family, the idea of raising wages was mentioned. William—just home from the war—protested that the company had lost four thousand dollars the previous fiscal year, therefore any significant new payroll expense would put them swiftly out of business. Nash, who had begun giving talks on the Golden Rule around town, informed his fellow stockholders that he would rather close up shop than exploit the men and women in his employ. Calling his workers together, including a woman of nearly eighty who had been earning four dollars per week sewing on buttons, another woman with kyphosis (hunchback), earning the same, and two Austrians with no English, Nash said to them, in part:

First, I want you to know that Brotherhood is a reality with me. You are all my brothers and sisters, children of the same great Father that I am, and entitled to all the justice and fair treatment that I want for myself. And so long as we run this shop [which to Nash meant three or four months longer] God being my helper, I am going to treat you as my brothers and sisters, and the Golden Rule is going to be our only governing law. Which means, that whatever I would like to have you do to me, were I in your place, I am going to do to you.

Then he raised both women's wages from four dollars per week, to twelve—tripling their pay with a two hundred percent increase. And having established the precedent, he worked all the way through his wage-sheet to the pressers whose weekly pay was eighteen dollars, raising them to twenty seven—a higher wage scale than had ever been paid in comparable shops in the city. In hopes he would have enough money left over after liquidating equipment and surplus fabric and then making up stockholder losses, Nash turned attention away from his business and toward Indiana, where he went in search of a small farm on which to retire.

Two months later, a friend in serious financial need sparked Nash's visit to his bookkeeper to inquire how much cash he could command, and he was astounded to discover that his newly acquired factory had more than tripled its business from the previous year. When Nash questioned his employees, he learned that after he had raised their wages and departed their company, "the little Italian presser" had addressed his fellow workers, saying that if he was boss and had just raised everyone's wages as Nash had, he would want everyone to "work like hell"—and that's just what they did. Nash shelved the idea of buying a farm and instead caught a train for New York to purchase more fabric.

In 1919, the year Nash took over the little sweatshop, America experienced the greatest wave of labor unrest in its history, with more than four million workers striking (though A. Nash Company workers never staged a walk-out). Anti-union sentiment swept the country's business community, and Nash was determined not to further antagonize it. His factory was small, one of the smallest concerns in Cincinnati, his workforce largely inexperienced, and he required credit with bankers and suppliers, and so he concluded that his should remain an open shop. Though many accused Nash of standing with the anti-union movement, according to Philip I. Roberts—who, for a posthumous edition of Nash's autobiography, wrote of the four years intervening between its publication and Nash's death—this is "an absolute mistake."

Nash called it, "the year of strikes, [and] industrial upheavals," especially in the garment and textile industries known for their underpaid, underfed, "pauper labor." Clothing prices skyrocketed, and production slowed to a near halt. Five other garment firms housed along with Nash's in the Power Building participated in Cincinnati's fourteen-week-long clothing workers strike. During the first week of the strike, which lasted from March through mid-June, A. Nash Company employees had to fight their way across picket lines. The remainder of the strike, for reasons Nash said he could not explain, his workers were able to cross unmolested, and were even treated courteously by the pickets. That year Nash's company did $525,678.43 worth of business, as compared to $132,190.20 the year previous, and by July, had outgrown its floor space in the Power Building, and moved into the vacated Joe Magnus Whisky Distillery building, also on East 8th. Going from one floor, to six, and hesitant to advertise, Nash told his employees that if they liked their jobs, to spread the word to their friends and neighbors, and then bring them into the factory and train them themselves. Nash's workforce quickly grew six hundred percent, without a single want ad.

==== The year 1920 ====
At the end of February, after absorbing the fifty thousand dollar expense of moving his factory, and giving his employees a series of raises that culminated at twenty percent, Nash found it was costing his company less to make a suit than it had before the payroll increases. When he proposed a profit-sharing plan to his workers, they opted to take theirs in wages. But they surprised Nash when the highest paid among them relinquished their claim to a considerable sum by petitioning management to base shared profits on time worked instead of on wages drawn."

In July, the public was accused of going on a non-buying strike when the American Woolen Company shut down more than half of its mills due to the cancelation by struggling clothing factories of over one hundred thousand dollars' worth of woolen and textile orders. Across the country, six hundred thousand needle workers were put out of their jobs. Unemployment had reached serious proportions, and in the fall Nash's employees once again presented management with a resolution, this time volunteering to take four weeks' vacation so that unemployed workers of Cincinnati might be given work in their place. Of this resolution, Nash wrote, "I was moved as I have seldom been moved ... It demonstrated that the Golden Rule had indeed become the lifeblood of our plant." That year the A. Nash Company did $1,580,700.46 worth of business—more than triple that of the year before— and Nash began issuing stock dividends to his employees.

==== The year 1921 ====
Despite the Depression of 1920-21—while industrial activities were shrinking and many businesses failing—the A. Nash Company again reached factory capacity and bought Cincinnati's vacant Moerlein Brewering Company bottling works, located on the southeast corner of Henry and Elm. Neither the bottling works, nor the converted distillery, were well adapted to the purpose of a clothing factory, and before extensive remodeling took place, Nash came under much criticism for not providing adequate facilities for his workers, especially the women.

===== The Amalgamated =====
Cincinnati's clothing workers strike of 1919 was largely financed through the general treasury of the Amalgamated Clothing Workers of America (A.C.W.A., or simply, "the Amalgamated"). Local 113 (tailors), which had been chartered in 1915, and Local 188 (pressers), whose charter in March 1919, precipitated the fourteen-week-long strike, united with Local 189 (cutters) on August 27, to form the Cincinnati Joint Board of the A.C.W.A., and by 1921, while Nash split his attention between public speaking and developing his newly acquired bottling plant into a clothing factory, the Joint Board focused its attention on organizing the Nash factories for the union.

On December 8, at Nash's invitation, the Amalgamated's president, Sidney Hillman, met with Nash in a hotel room in New York. Nash described for Hillman the awkward and false position he felt himself in, finding his Golden Rule experiment used as an argument against unionizing other factories. Nash invited Hillman to Cincinnati to address a meeting of his workers Christmas week, with a view toward bringing the union in. When Nash returned to Cincinnati on December 10, he found that during his absence the Joint Board had distributed two "scurrilous bulletins" inside his factories. That same day, Nash wrote to Hillman and rescinded the invitation, citing the resentment that had been aroused among his workers. Nash went on to express his sincere regret, but also his faith in "the eternal destiny," wishing Hillman every success in his great work. Nash had no sooner signed the letter than his presence was requested at "a great mass meeting" called by his employees, wherein they presented him with a resolution calling for the immediate resignation of any A. Nash Company employees from the ranks of the Amalgamated, or else forfeit their jobs. Nash went on record as saying, "I am opposed to this open shop movement, although the A. Nash Company is not unionized. So long as the present avaricious organizations of capital continue, I can conceive of no worse condition of abject servitude than for labour to be unorganized." From that time until the end of his life, Nash spent a large portion of his time traveling around the country preaching the Golden Rule to businessmen's and social welfare organizations, "with fiery oratory and sincere fervor."

==== The year 1922 ====
The September issue of Success magazine featured an article by Ruth White Colton, who, posing as a widow, was hired on at the A. Nash Company under the alias of "Hattie Clark." She spent two weeks as an undercover factory worker, journaling her experiences—one of which was witnessing, along with a thousand of her co-workers assembled in the plant's cutting room, the marriage of Nash's son, William, to the company secretary, Bertha Fisher.

About six months prior to Colton's journalistic investigation, a man by the name of John Sydell held up and robbed the A. Nash Company cashier of the plant's weekly payroll. When he was pronounced guilty, concern for Sydell's wife and four young children prompted a discussion between Nash and his employees on how they might be of service to the family. Colton was present at the factory meeting when it was decided Mrs. Sydell would be put on the company payroll at $20 per week, provided she agreed to use the money to make a good home for her children. And it was "Hattie Clark" that all six hundred workers present voted should deliver the money to Mrs. Sydell each week, and make sure that it was spent correctly. During this meeting, immediately following the vote, Colton revealed her true identity.

Among other favorable observations, Colton wrote of Nash being opposed to overtime work. Having already reduced the workday to eight hours and the workweek to forty, he was studying ways to further reduce the hours of female workers, whom he claimed, "had the additional burdens of the home to carry." Nash obtained permission to include Colton's article in his autobiography, which he would publish the following year. In it, Colton described a constant process of growth, development, and expansion—both spiritual and material—as the greatest feature of what she called, "this remarkable experiment." She reported that every change in economic or social policy in the factory had come either at a worker's suggestion, or through a discussion between employer and employee.

Not all publicity that year was favorable, however. Survey contributor, S. Adele Shaw, provided an eyewitness account of shabby and unsanitary conditions in the Nash factory on East 8th. In an article appearing in the Survey's March 18 issue, Shaw cited overflowing trash receptacles, poor lighting, and odiferous plumbing problems. Though complaints about the facilities—especially for the female workers—were not without precedent, Shaw also pointed out that there was no mechanism for employee representation in management in the Nash shops, and that semi-annual mass meetings were, "without exception," called by management, whose agenda was then imposed upon the workers. The latter report stands in stark contrast to Colton's, who described factory meetings as informal, as being called “from time to time,” and most often "by one of the lesser members of the family.” The A. Nash Company was a "true Industrial Democracy," Colton wrote—one she had actually participated in.

A special train was sent from Cincinnati to the National Association of Specialty Salesmen's annual convention at Cedar Point in July, bearing Nash (who was the association's president) and two hundred and fifty of Nash's employees. Delegations from New York, Boston, and Philadelphia were in attendance at the Sandusky gathering, with Nash the most prominent figure. Colton was in charge of the event's publicity.

==== The year 1923 ====
In early spring, it was reported that Nash had established a vegetarian cafeteria for his 2,100 employees, having hired a dietician from the Washington Institute to plan well-balanced meals that created "brains as well as brawn." Though there is no evidence that Nash himself practiced abstaining from meat once he left the Adventist faith, he credited his parents' (both then in their mid-70s) longtime vegetarianism for their longevity.

In July, Nash announced the 35-hour work week for women, stating that, "it was an insult to the Master himself to talk about building the kingdom of heaven on earth when women workers are bending over machines for forty hours a week," and instead of reducing the wage scale, he established a minimum wage of fifty cents an hour.

Before the year's end, Nash's autobiography, The Golden Rule in Business was published, with the final chapter, "Something Attempted, Something Done"—the transcript of a speech he delivered to the student body of Harvard Business School four days before his manuscript was due to the publishers—included at the last minute. The following excerpts are from that speech:

- ... there is a difference in the spiritual sense between "organization" and "organism," and I believe that in most of the organization work that we have tried to do in this world we have made a mechanism out of it; and human beings, who are spiritual beings, do not fit as cogs into a thing that is worked out on an architect's plan ... It doesn't work that way.
- The fundamental thing in industrial economics, as well as in all phases of human relationships, is to adjust all conditions so as to develop human beings of "full stature" ... In other words, ability, energy, and wealth should be devoted to the development of men and women.
- I believe that any system of economics or sociology or business teaching to be unsound that does not start on this fundamental basis: that the men and women connected with it are the important, the vital, asset of that business, and that their development ... is the important and the fundamental thing on which to build any institution.
- ... in the philosophy of Jesus and in His philosophy, alone, is centred the hope of the world. Remember, I am not talking about any of the fifty-seven varieties of philosophy extant about Him; I am talking about His philosophy, and therein lies all the difference. I am talking about the marvelous revelation of sociology, psychology and theology He gave the world, which He summed up, and put into one sentence ... : "Therefore, all things whatsoever ye would that men should do to you do ye even so to them: for this is the law and the prophets." In that, and that alone, lies the hope of mankind.

==== The year 1924 ====
In January, Nash received a call from a reporter who was covering the story of Cincinnati nurse, Olivia Stone, who, in a crime of passion had shot and killed her lover, Brooklyn lawyer, Ellis G. Kinkead. Stone was acquitted by a jury, but found the court of public opinion another matter altogether. Though a free woman, she was reduced to her last dollar and turned away from her friends and her profession; she told the reporter that there was "nothing left but to die." "Send her to my office," Nash responded, and he gave Stone a job as a visiting nurse for his factories.

An article in a Bradford, Pennsylvania, newspaper in October encouraged every employer and employee in the city to attend the first of four meetings of "unusual interest," organized by the Board of Commerce. Nash was expected to lecture on how it was possible to combine an honest endeavor and a great spiritual principle, "and transform a group of common people into a most uncommon fellowship."

Nash had lowered prices, raised wages repeatedly, reduced both the workday and the workweek, and stabilized employment. And yet the money kept coming in. Knowing that his share of a stock dividend would soon make him a millionaire, Nash raised the question to the public; "Who had produced this wealth, [and] in consequence to whom did it belong?" Thousands upon thousands of letters poured in, "most of them begging letters," Nash wrote, "some pathetic, some humorous, many ridiculous." Father Keefer, a Catholic priest Nash had never met, stopped by his office and tried to convince Nash that it would be wrong in God's eyes were he to give the money away. In May, Nash distributed to his employees his share of a dividend (that would have paid him $1,200,000), transferring to them, in five years time, control of the company. Nash believed his employees were entitled to these profits because their labors had made the money; he felt, in fact, that he would be, "the arch fiend of the ages," were he to personally appropriate the riches.

There is very little mention of Nash's relationship with his parents beyond his early break with them. In September 1924, however—to celebrate their fifty-fifth wedding anniversary—Evermont and Rachel were photographed visiting their famous son, "for the first time in seven years."

==== The year 1925 ====
In January, the J.C. Penney Company hosted a great Mercantile convention at the Ambassador Hotel in Atlantic City. Six special Pullman trains were required to carry the attendees from around the country to the three-day event. Nash was listed among the notable speakers, along with Mr. James Cash Penney.

Addressing the Universalist Laymen's Association at New York's Hotel Commodore, also in January, Nash offered up a check for $1,000, stating he would add $20,000 more per year, for five years, if other churchmen of any denomination would raise $900,000. This fund was meant to advance the brotherhood movement in the United States, regardless of denomination or creed.

Making a habit of attending all the sessions of the general religious conventions wherein he was invited to speak, Nash came to the conclusion that sectarianism seemed to be the universal law with churches. This perplexed him, prompting him to join the Universalists. He became a trustee of their general convention. Under Nash's leadership, the lay members of the Universalist Church, who believed that great opportunities for constructive spiritual progress existed in Turkey, gave $25,000, with the promise of $50,000 more each year for five years, to what would be known as the Turkish-American Club. Nash founded and endowed the Brotherhood of Man movement in Turkey with $100,000 of his own money, intended to promote amity between young Turks and their Christian neighbors. Missionary work was organized, having as its objective the brotherhood of man, without any one religious sect predominating.

===== How the union came =====
By 1925, the A. Nash Company had become the largest producer of direct-to-consumer clothing in America, doing $12,000,000 worth of business, and making history as the fastest growing industry the country had ever seen. One of the nation's best known orators, Nash was called "the most famous layman in the United States,"—having delivered addresses in nearly every state in the union. Invitations to speak at religious, civic, and industrial functions poured in, and as his company and workforce grew, Nash felt compelled to spend more and more of his time out in the field. Deprived of his personality and direct influence, morale in Nash's company began to suffer. Subordinate executives "failed to maintain either the standard of their chief's idealism, or the equity consequent upon its adoption," and soon favoritism, discrimination, and shoddy workmanship reared their ugly heads.

"Something of all this," Roberts wrote, "Nash either knew or sensed." So Nash decided to place his problems before a group of local ministers, explaining that it was impossible to provide the same mentoring and oversight—with his payroll numbering in the thousands—as he had been able when his company was small. He asked the ministers to take whatever organization "the Church has for establishing the Kingdom of God in industry," and go through his factories thoroughly to discover everything that is "not in harmony with the principles and teachings of Jesus." When one of the ministers accused Nash of knowing full well the church had no such organization, Nash demanded of them, "What, then, is the job of the church?" Nash concluded that if organized religion couldn't do the job of helping him protect the interests and welfare of his workers, he would have to look elsewhere."

In February, Frank Rosenblum, general executive board member of the Amalgamated, met with general organizers, Jack Kroll, Emilio Grandinetti, and Celestine Goddard, to decide on a new method for organizing the Nash workers. Goddard was put in charge of a plan that included directing negative publicity toward the working conditions in Nash's factories. In July, in Olivet, Michigan, the claims of the Amalgamated were put before a council of churchmen by Hillman and the union's economic advisor, Leo Wolman, and as a result of this conference, the first effective contacts between Nash and the union were established.

On December 1, in a private Washington, D.C. meeting that had been initiated by Hillman, Nash accused him of sponsoring the "guerilla warfare" the Joint Board had carried out against the A. Nash Company in the four years since their failed meeting in New York. Hillman not only denied this, he denied knowledge of the actions in question. Nash returned to Cincinnati armed with Hillman's written disavowal, which said, in part:

Some of those who represented us in Cincinnati, moved by excessive zeal and often by ignorance, were led to make reckless and inaccurate statements which put the organization in the light of denying those universal principles of conduct embodied in the Golden Rule ... The work of the organized labor movement as the Amalgamated sees it, is to bring the precepts of the Golden Rule into the daily working lives of the masses of men and women.

On Tuesday, December 8, four years to the day since his New York meeting with Hillman, Nash gathered his employees—most of whom where anti-union—and urged them to join with the Amalgamated. The next day, A. Nash Company foremen and junior supervisors held anti-union meetings in the factories, whipping up unrest and uncertainty among the workers. On Thursday, December 10, in a move that attracted nationwide attention, Nash assembled his executive heads and all of his thousands of employees—more than 80% of them female—for a great mass meeting at the Shubert Theater in Cincinnati to hear Hillman make the case for the Amalgamated. Hillman's speech was at first met with approval, but when a company executive addressed the crowd, a great deal of animosity toward the union was exhibited. In a dramatic struggle Nash described as, "the supreme hour of his life," he appealed to his employees. Addressing them as "Fellow-workers," he challenged them, in part: "Are we to be pointed to as an example, and quoted as an argument, why avaricious organizations should be allowed to exploit their labour, and grind their dollars out of the very sweat and blood of our brothers and sisters in their factories; or shall we join with this great group of organized workers, who are striving to loose the bonds of wickedness, lift the burdens of the heavy-laden and let the oppressed go free?" He even went so far as to commit to his workers that if unionization did not turn out as Hillman had promised, Nash would personally ask them to rescind their decision. A vote was taken, and by the next day, with "three thousand new members in the ranks of the labor movement ... the seas subsided, calm again reigned supreme, and the union was established."

On Friday, December 11, a luncheon in honor of Nash and Hillman—attended by more than seventy of the city's foremost business, civic, educational, and religious leaders—was held at Cincinnati's Business Men's Club. The faith the two leaders had shown one another was praised, along with their faith in democracy, and, "the fine example they had shown to American industry." Addressing the group, Nash expressed fear of the deadening effect of organization as an end in itself, rather than a means to an end. Though he believed the Golden Rule would one day be enough, with industrial conditions as they were, experience had persuaded him that the trade-union was, "an essential means to brotherhood." United States courts of appeals judge, Julian Mack, appealed to the group to marshal public opinion behind an experiment he regarded as, "the highest promise to American industry and to industrial democracy throughout the world."

=== Last two years ===
The year 1926 opened with nearly four thousand regular workers on Nash's payroll, and a sales force of about two thousand scattered around the country. On January 7, the agreement between the Amalgamated and the A. Nash Company was ratified at Cincinnati's Emery Auditorium. The Amalgamated's experts, drawn from 140,000 of its most experienced workers, advised Nash on the technical details of production as well as the routing layout of his factories. And the union made many other changes that helped Nash stabilize his business, increase his profit margin, and accumulate reserves to safeguard his company from future economic vicissitudes. Jeffrey Wattles, author of, The Golden Rule, wrote: "The union's technical competence, which Nash had previously rejected as deadening, proved most helpful." Wattles went on to explain that, "many techniques of scientific management that [Nash] had scorned as mere mechanical substitutes for human cooperation were introduced, and he found that they in fact constituted the very extension and application of the golden rule itself."

On December 26, 1926, Nash published the first of fifty-two issues of The Nash Journal, a weekly magazine filled with editorials, inspirational quotes and tidbits of wisdom, business advice, company happenings, and news of the world—including much about Turkey, brotherhood, race relations, religious tolerance, home and family life, and women's rights. Through its pages, Roberts wrote, Nash, "could find free expression." In answer to the anticipated question, "What is this?" Nash had the following printed on the cover of the magazine's first issue:

In dedicating the journal to the task of making Universal Brotherhood a reality in this world, we shall constantly urge:

- First— That the strong and the wise shall help the weak and the unwise, until the weak and unwise shall become strong and wise.
- Second— We shall uncompromisingly urge and work for equality of opportunity for all, and special privilege to none.
- Third— We dedicate this Journal to the principle of opposition to war, and dominance merely by power of force, whether that force be military or economical, whether in industrial relationships or internal relationships.
- Fourth— While taking no partisan stand in politics, we shall not hesitate to ally all of our resources with any political movement that proves itself to be for the furtherance of the ideas and principles for which we stand.
- Fifth— The Journal shall always plead for and exercise tolerance in the field of religion. We shall not interest ourselves in changing the religion of any man. We shall constantly urge that any man live up to the highest ideals of his religion.

In the second issue, Nash wrote one of the journal's most frequently quoted articles, in which he said:

Whatever success has come to The A. Nash Company, in living the Golden Rule, has come, because there has been just enough business knowledge to enable us to live it to just that degree, and whenever we have failed in exercising the very highest and keenest business judgment on a truly ethical basis, it has been because we did not have sufficient insight to understand our obligation measured by the Golden Rule. In other words, perfect and infallible living of the Golden Rule would require infallible mentality and undaunted courage. This we do not claim ... However, we are more and more convinced of the immutability and the infallibility of the Golden Rule, as we approach nearer and nearer to the ability to live it.

The two years following unionization of Nash's company were the busiest in his life. He labored fervently, giving countless addresses at innumerable functions. "The tax upon his physical resources," Roberts wrote, "was appalling." In the summer of 1927, it was Nash's friends who convinced him to seek medical care. Soon it seemed the crises had been averted, but it later came to light that Nash had secretly continued suffering agonizing attacks of angina pectoris.

In late October, Nash appointed Herbert R. Bloch chairman of his entire organization and named ten more men to his board of management—one of them, Jack Kroll, business agent of the Amalgamated. Gathering the eleven together, he told them that he would be going on a "long vacation," and effective immediately, gave them complete authority to act in his stead.

== Death and afterward ==
On Saturday, October 29—less than a week after forming his management board—Nash, at the insistence of his physicians, was taken to Cincinnati's Good Samaritan Hospital. The next day he claimed to be feeling better, expressing hope that he would soon resume his business duties. But later that same day, Sunday, October 30, he was seized by a fatal heart attack.

On November 2, funeral services, attended by "a great throng," were held at the Masonic Temple in Walnut Hills. "It was difficult—" observed Roberts, "well-nigh impossible—for large numbers of those present to even approximately realize that a personality so impressive and as vigorous ... should have been so swiftly silenced." Only those who had been near and dear to Nash participated in the service proper, among them, Joseph Fort Newton, who said of his friend; "Arthur Nash was a man lovable in his manliness, altogether admirable in his domestic relations, loyal in his friendships, prophetic in his citizenship, gentle in strength, wise and winsome in counsel, exquisite in sympathy, rich in insight, broad and tolerant in understanding, a true man." Also speaking at the funeral, the Amalgamated's president, Sidney Hillman, said of Nash:

He belonged to that small group of employers who believe that the human material is a vastly different thing from the mere physical material with which they work ... When recognition of the union in his shop became possible, he rested neither night nor day until he had inspired confidence, both in the Nash shops, and in their union representatives. He gave his loyalty to collective bargaining with every fiber of his being, and such bargaining meant just one thing—absolute and unqualified relations of trust and honor with the union ... It is true that he preached in order to spread the gospel of service he believed in. But he did more. More important than all his principles ... was the fact that he practiced what he preached ... Arthur was a true humanitarian, to whom the welfare of all his fellows was a matter of vital personal concern. He has left humanity richer for his having lived, and yet, in another sense, poorer for his having gone from us. A spirit, however, has gone out from the man that Death has not power to still. What Arthur Nash believed in and tried to achieve has not died, and the only fitting way for us to honor his memory is to strive tirelessly to realize the higher civilization which he longed so much to see before he closed his eyes on this earthy scene.

When a bank trust officer applied to administer Nash's estate in probate court on November 9, it was disclosed that Nash had left no will. Nash's personal worth at the time of his death was estimated at one million dollars. Without a will, under Ohio law Maude would receive one third, the remainder to be divided among other heirs.

The last issue of The Nash Journal, "In Memoriam," was published on November 28, 1927, with transcripts of eulogies and many other glowing tributes to Nash—of which the following snippets are a sample—gracing its pages:

- He proved in his factory what he somehow knew, that Catholic, Protestant, Jew, and unbeliever know alike how to love, how to be friends, how to stand by one another in a great undertaking. Our differences are theological and racial rather than of the soul. Never have racial and religious prejudice been so rebuked ... than by the Nash experiment. —Worth M. Tippy, of the Federal Council of Churches
- No one of his friends can remember an instance where he showed a love of money for its own sake. From the crucifix which he ever carried in the pocket of his vest, he had learned another lesson. A divine philosophy drove deeply into his heart that his was a stewardship in service of the master. —Augustine Walsh, O.S.B, Former pastor, St. Andrews Church, Cincinnati.
- It has been said and, as I believe, quite truly, that Arthur Nash literally gave his life for the great and splendid experiment in human brotherhood of which his clothes-factory was but the outward and visible symbol. —Philip I. Roberts
- The words he spoke, the deeds he lived, are recorded in the eternal ethers. A new invention will in time reproduce them, in film ... —May Cornell Stoiber, Unity Center leader

In 1929, the September fifth issue of the Kokomo Tribune carried a story reporting the sale by Ralph Nash, his mother, and his two siblings of more than two million dollars' worth of A. Nash Company stock. The stock transfer, which occurred less than two months before the stock market crash of 1929, passed complete control of the company to the buyer, Cincinnati brokers, W.E. Fox & Co. Claiming the purchase was made as an investment, the new owners denied plans to merge Nash's company with another manufacturing house, or to offer Nash company stock—whose total value was estimated at four million dollars at the time—to the public.

== Philosophical and religious views ==
- At the beginning of his business venture—though Nash thought the Golden Rule right—he saw it as impractical idealism, and was skeptical that a business could be successfully operated on that principle. When prosperity came, Nash believed he had been given too much credit, and that his real role had been merely to provide an opportunity for the operation of the Golden Rule in industry.
- Nash came to regard the last clause of Matthew 7:12, "for this is the law and the prophets," as the most important phrase of the verse, believing Jesus was in effect stating; "this is the beginning and ending of my gospel." The Golden Rule, for Nash, summed up the whole of Jesus' teachings.
- "The application of the philosophy of Jesus, as it is summed up in the Golden Rule is the solution to the troubles of the world, whether industrial, political, or spiritual," Nash stated before a Presbyterian conference in Milwaukee. He went on to call strikes, "a social cancer caused by oppression in industry," pointing out that industry placed supreme emphasis, "where supreme value does not reside."
- When asked, "Do you think I could apply the Golden Rule in my business?" Nash answered, "You might just as well resolve to fly through the air without an airplane as to resolve to live the Golden Rule without proper equipment. Indispensable to that equipment is the right attitude toward one's fellows. So long as they are 'dubs' and 'foreigners,' it is impossible."
- Nash wrote; "The Golden Rule is the divine law governing human relationships, accepted by all religions and proclaimed by all prophets and teachers of every creed. It is the only infallible, workable, industrial and economic law in the universe today."
- "The laws of God governing human relationships," Nash stated, "are as fixed and unalterable as the law of gravitation itself."
- Nash diagnosed the trouble with Christianity as sectarianism he described as, "denominational cussedness rather than consciousness." He told of preachers, when he was a boy, who, rather than devoting their time to discoursing on brotherly love, gave most of their efforts to defending their own church's creed, while harshly criticizing the creeds of others, "and the more that they lambasted other creeds," Nash said, "the more it pleased their congregations."
- Nash's anti-war views are exemplified in The Nash Journal article entitled, "The Abolition of War": "all that is necessary to abolish war is that the nations of each should come together and unanimously agree that this horrible wasting of lives and economic values should never again be resorted to as a method of settling international difficulties, because it settles nothing."
- Nash did not believe in time clocks.
- Referring to those whom he said, "take human beings and make machines of them to speed up production," Nash told a convention of southern business men, "Build a wall higher than Babylon around your city, and write on it 'Efficiency engineers keep out!'"
- Nash regarded the accumulation of great wealth as incompatible with living by the Golden Rule.
- The Dictionary of American Biography printed of Nash: "[He was] a shrewd business man, with a flair for leadership and a full understanding of the value of the publicity secured by his speeches, Nash was by nature and training a sincere and aggressive evangelist. To him the 'Golden Rule in Business' was a religion, and not merely a successful advertising slogan."
- Arthur Nash: "If we can't have clothes without taking the mothers of the next generation, we can go without them [clothes, that is]."
- Nash forever insisted that no system or group action could take the place of individual effort. He believed that the will to serve, rather than the will to govern and control, must be the individual aim and motive of all group members, or else end up with "nothing other than an aggregation of illiberality and the pooled selfishness of units."
- Philip Roberts: "The truth of the whole matter lay in the moral rather than the industrial stratum of the situation."

== Quotes by and about Nash ==
More than anything else, he was a man of faith. I do not mean faith in creeds or theology ... I do not mean the faith that is a surrender to reason or a refuge for mental indolence and mediocrity. But I do mean the faith that Christ meant exactly what he said when he pronounced the Golden Rule as the rule and guide for the lives of men.

—Champe S. Andrews, National Folding Box Company

Whenever there is anything wrong with human relationships in this world, it is because they are out of harmony with the law which was revealed by the Great Teacher of Galilee ... "Therefore all things whatsoever ye would that men should do to you, do ye even so to them, for this is the law and the prophets."

—Arthur Nash
