= Joseph Fort Newton =

American minister and Masonic author (1880-1950)

The Reverend Joseph Fort Newton
- Born: July 21, 1880; Decatur, Texas, U.S.
- Died: January 24, 1950 (aged 69); Merion, Pennsylvania, U.S.
- Resting place: Old St. David's Cemetery, Radnor, PA, U.S.
- Education: Southern Baptist Seminary
- Occupations: Minister, priest, author
- Spouse: Jennie Mai Deatherage
- Children: Joseph E. Newton and Josephine Newton
- Writing career
- Language: English

Joseph Fort Newton (1880–1950) was an American Protestant minister and a prominent Masonic author.

Newton was ordained a Baptist minister in 1895. After leaving Baptism he was associated with non-sectarian and Universalist churches, and in 1926 was ordained a deacon and priest in the Episcopal Church.

== Biography ==
He was born in Decatur, Texas, the son of a Baptist minister turned attorney. He attended Southern Baptist Seminary, and Harvard University. While at Harvard he studied under William James. Newton held the honorary degrees of Doctor of Hebrew Literature (Coe College, 1912), Doctor of Divinity (Tufts University, 1919), Doctor of Humane Letters (Hobart and William Smith Colleges, 1926), and Doctor of Laws (Temple University, 1929).

Newton was ordained a Baptist minister in 1895. He held Baptist pastorates in Texas, and led non-sectarian and Universalist congregations in Illinois and Iowa. While in Iowa, he taught English literature at the extension campus of the University of Iowa in Cedar Rapids. While in Cedar Rapids, many of Newton's sermons were published and gained wide circulation. Their popularity in England led him to be called to the pulpit of the City Temple (London) in 1916. During his four years at City Temple, he made trips throughout the British Isles and gained international fame through sermons in which he urged understanding between England and the United States as a basis of world order and abiding peace.

In 1920, Newton returned to the United States and assumed the pulpit at the Church of the Divine Paternity, New York City, NY. While there Newton served as an editor of the Christian Century, edited the Best Sermons of the Year series, and preached at colleges and universities across the United States.

At the invitation of the Diocese of Pennsylvania Bishop Thomas J. Garland, Newton entered the ministry of the Episcopal Church in September 1925, and came to the Memorial Church of St. Paul, Overbrook, Philadelphia, PA, as a "special minister." He was ordained as a priest in 1926 at Christ Church, Philadelphia, PA. Newton remained at the Memorial Church of St. Paul until 1930. From 1930 to 1938, Newton assisted the Rev. Dr. John C. H. Mockridge at St. James Church, Philadelphia, PA. In 1938 he assumed the rectorship of Church of St. Luke and The Epiphany, Philadelphia, PA, where he remained until his death in 1950. In 1939, Newton was ranked among the top 5 Protestant Clergyman in the United States. From 1944 until his death, Newton reviewed religious books and wrote a Saturday sermon column for the Philadelphia Evening Bulletin. Newton authored over 30 books, perhaps his most famous being The Builders: A Story and Study of Freemasonry, published in 1914, and translated into six different languages. The Builders is still regarded as one of the best books on the topic.

=== Ministerial career ===
- First Baptist Church, Paris, TX
- People's Church, Dixon, IL
- Universalist Liberal Church, Cedar Rapids, IA
- City Temple, London, England
- Church of the Divine Paternity, New York City, NY (Fourth Universalist Society in the City of New York)
- Memorial Church of St. Paul, Philadelphia, PA
- St. James Church, Philadelphia, PA
- Church of St. Luke and The Epiphany, Philadelphia, PA

=== Marriage and children ===
Joseph Fort Newton married Jennie Mai Deatherage (1880–1954) of Sanders, KY in 1900.

- Joseph Emerson Newton (1903–1974). AB Harvard. Professor of English, University of Florida. Married Blanche Howard Gaillard.
- Josephine Newton(1909–death) BA Vassar. Married, first, Clement Warrant Hooven, and, second, _____ Morris.

=== Freemasonry ===
Newton authored a number of Masonic books, including his best-known works, The Builders, published in 1914, and The Men’s House, published in 1923. He published his autobiography, River of Years, in 1944. Newton was given the Third Degree of Freemasonry on May 28, 1902, in Friendship Lodge No. 7, Dixon, Illinois, later affiliating with Mt. Hermon Lodge No. 263, Cedar Rapids, Iowa. He also served as Grand Chaplain of the Grand Lodge of Iowa from 1911 to 1913 and Grand Prelate of the Grand Encampment of Knights Templar. While living in Philadelphia he was a member of Lodge No. 51. The Builders has been called "an outstanding classic in Masonic literature offering the early history of Freemasonry."

== Works ==
- The Builders: A Story and Study of Freemasonry (Cedar Rapids Iowa, The Torch Press 1914).
- Altar Stairs: a Little Book of Prayer (New York: Macmillan, 1928).
- Brothers and Builders: the Basis and Spirit of Freemasonry (London: Masonic Record, 1924).
- David Swing: Poet and Preacher (Chicago: Unity, 1909).
- Everyday Religion (New York: Abingdon, 1950).
- God and the Golden Rule (New York: Century, 1927).
- If I Only Had One Sermon to Prepare (New York: Harper & Brothers, 1932).
- Life Victorious, a Testament of Faith (Chicago, Revell, 1940).
- Lincoln and Herndon (Cedar Rapids: Torch, 1910).
- Live, Love, and Learn: a Little Book about the Great Business of Living (New York: Harper & Brothers, 1943).
- Living Everyday: a Book of Faith, Philosophy, and Fun (New York: Harper & Brothers, 1937).
- Living up to Life: a Book of Courage, Common Sense, and Compassion (New York: Harper & Brothers, 1941).
- Modern Masonry: a Brief Sketch of the Craft Since 1717 (Washington: Masonic Service Association of the United States, 1924).
- My Idea of God: A Symposium of Faith (Boston: Little, Brown, and Co., 1926).
- Preaching in London: A Diary of Anglo-American Friendship (New York: Doran, 1922).
- Preaching in New York (New York: Doran, 1924).
- River of Years: Autobiography (New York: Lippincott, 1946).
- Some Living Masters of the Pulpit: Studies in Religious Personality (New York: Doran, 1923).
- The Angel in the Soul (New York: Harper & Brothers, 1932).
- The Great Light in Masonry (Washington: Masonic Service Association of the United States, 1924).
- The Men's House: Masonic Papers and Addresses (New York: Doran, 1923).
- The One Great Church: Adventures of Faith (New York: Macmillan, 1948).
- The Religious Basis for a Better World Order (New York: Revell, 1920).
- The Stuff of Life (New York: Harper & Brothers, 1939).
- The Sword and the Spirit: Britain and America in the Great War (New York: Doran, 1918).
- The Truth and the Life and Other Sermons (New York: Doran, 1926).
- The Religion of Masonry: An Interpretation (Washington: Masonic Service Association of the United States, 1927).
- Things I Know in Religion (New York: Harper & Brothers, 1930).
- Wesley & Woolman (New York: Abingdon, 1914).
- What Have the Saints to Teach Us? (Chicago: Revell, 1914).
- Where We are in Religion (New York: Macmillan, 1945).
