= St. Paul's Episcopal Church (Richmond, Virginia) =

Historic church in Virginia, United States

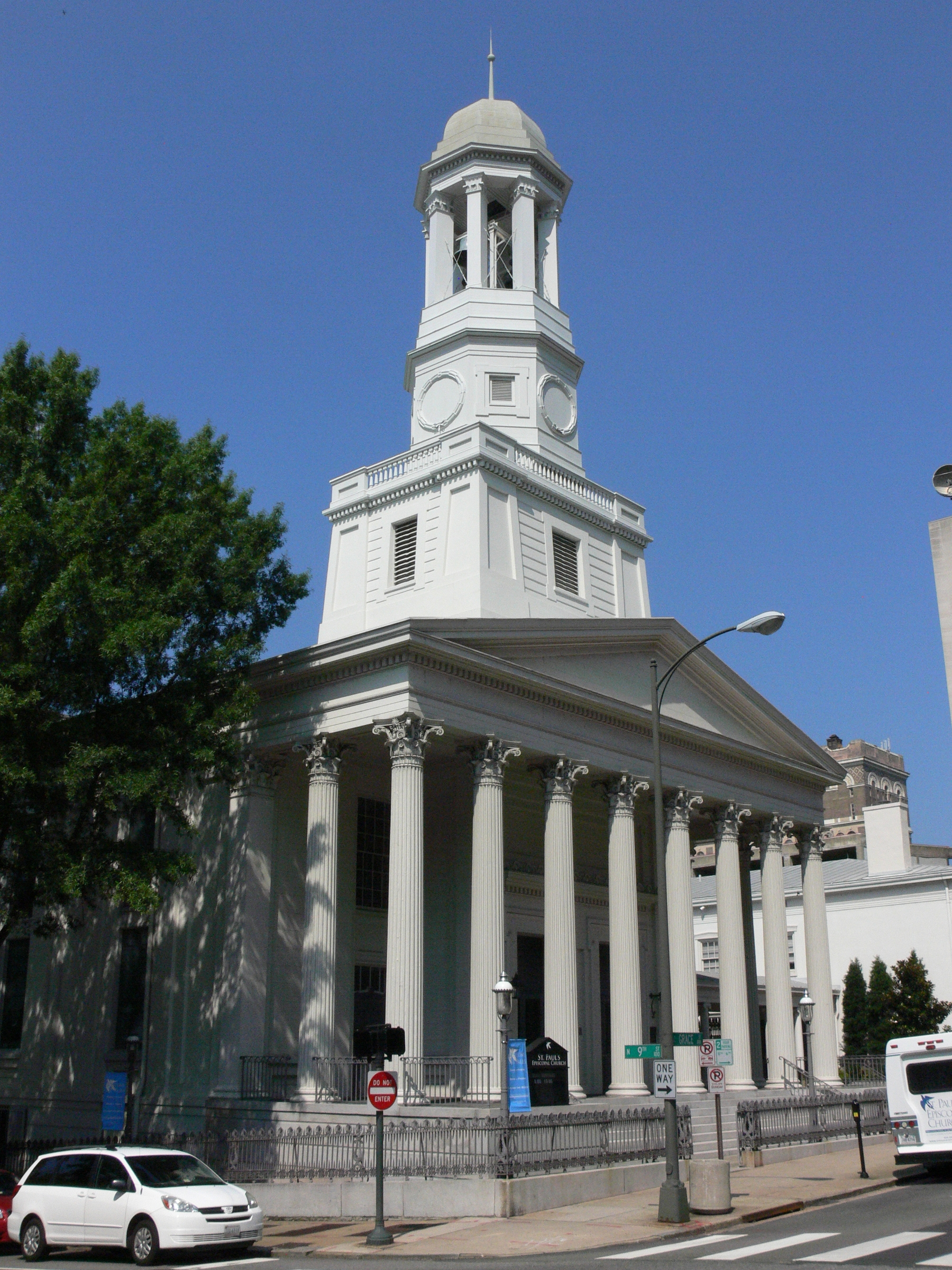
- Image of St. Paul's Church in Richmond, Virginia, USA

Religion
- Affiliation: Episcopal Church
- Ecclesiastical or organisational status: Active
- Leadership: The Rev. Charlie Dupree, the Rev. Gwynn Crichton, the Rev. Andie Rohrs, the Rev. Rainey Dankel, the Rev. Ben Campbell
- Year consecrated: 1845
- Status: Active

Location
- Location: 815 E. Grace St., Richmond, Virginia
- State: Virginia
- Interactive map of St. Paul's Episcopal Church
- Coordinates: 37°32′24″N 77°26′07″W

Architecture
- Architect: Thomas Somerville Stewart
- Style: Greek Revival
- Completed: 1845

Specifications
- Direction of façade: northeast
- Capacity: 850
- Materials
- St. Paul's Church
- U.S. National Register of Historic Places
- Virginia Landmarks Register
- Richmond City Historic District
- Location within Virginia Location within the United States
- Location: 815 E. Grace St., Richmond, Virginia
- Coordinates: 37°32′23″N 77°26′7″W
- Area: 0.8 acres (0.32 ha)
- Built: 1845
- Architect: Steward, Thomas B.
- NRHP reference No.: 69000357
- VLR No.: 127-0014

Significant dates
- Added to NRHP: June 4, 1969
- Designated VLR: November 5, 1968

Website
- https://www.stpaulsrva.org/

St. Paul's Episcopal Church is an historic Episcopal church in Richmond, Virginia, United States. Located directly across Ninth Street from the Virginia State Capitol, it has long been a popular house of worship for Richmond political figures. During the American Civil War, the church was frequently visited by Confederate President Jefferson Davis and General Robert E. Lee, earning it the nickname Cathedral of the Confederacy.

The church reported 859 members in 2017 and 643 members in 2023; no membership statistics were reported nationally in 2024 parochial reports. Plate and pledge income reported for the congregation in 2024 was $870,298. Average Sunday attendance (ASA) in 2024 was 177 persons. It is a parish of the Episcopal Diocese of Virginia.

== History ==
The church formerly displayed icons and memorials to the Confederacy, including altar cushions embroidered with Confederate flags, brass pew markers designating where Davis and Lee sat, and memorials to the Confederate first family, many of which were donated by the United Daughters of the Confederacy. The church historically hosted the United Daughters of the Confederacy on Robert E. Lee Day and for the organization's annual memorial services. The church began removing Confederate imagery in 2015. In 2022, graffiti, including "I Can't Breathe" and the name of George Floyd, was spray-painted on the church steps during a Black Lives Matter protest. The church decided to leave the graffiti intact as a "meaningful statement" and as memorials to meditate on, rather than Confederates.

Other notable people associated with the church are the Rev. Dr. Charles Minnigerode, who led the church from 1856 to 1889, including during the Civil War and Reconstruction eras, and the Rev. John Shelby Spong, who was a retired bishop of the Diocese of Newark, began to attract national attention while rector of St. Paul's (1969–1976).

St. Paul's was built in 1845 as a branch of the Monumental Church, which had outgrown its building. The Greek Revival church was designed by Thomas Somerville Stewart and modeled largely on St. Luke's Church, now Church of St. Luke & the Epiphany, in Philadelphia. The cornerstone was laid on October 10, 1843 and the church was consecrated on November 11, 1845. The estimated cost before construction was "not exceeding $53,500," excluding the organ and purchased lots. This cost later rose to $55,000. The organ was purchased for around $4,000 and the two lots for the church were $6,000 and $1,075. In 1845, there were 804 sittings in the nave and 358 in the gallery for a total occupancy of 1,162 parishioners.

When St. Paul's was first built, it had a much more imposing figure than it does today due to the old 225 foot tall spire. This spire was significant in that it surpassed the State Capitol as the highest structure in the city of Richmond from 1845 to 1900-1905, when the spire was removed out of stability fears. It was replaced by a much smaller 135 foot tall octagonal dome, which is how the church appears in the present day. It was listed on the National Register of Historic Places in 1969 as St. Paul's Church.

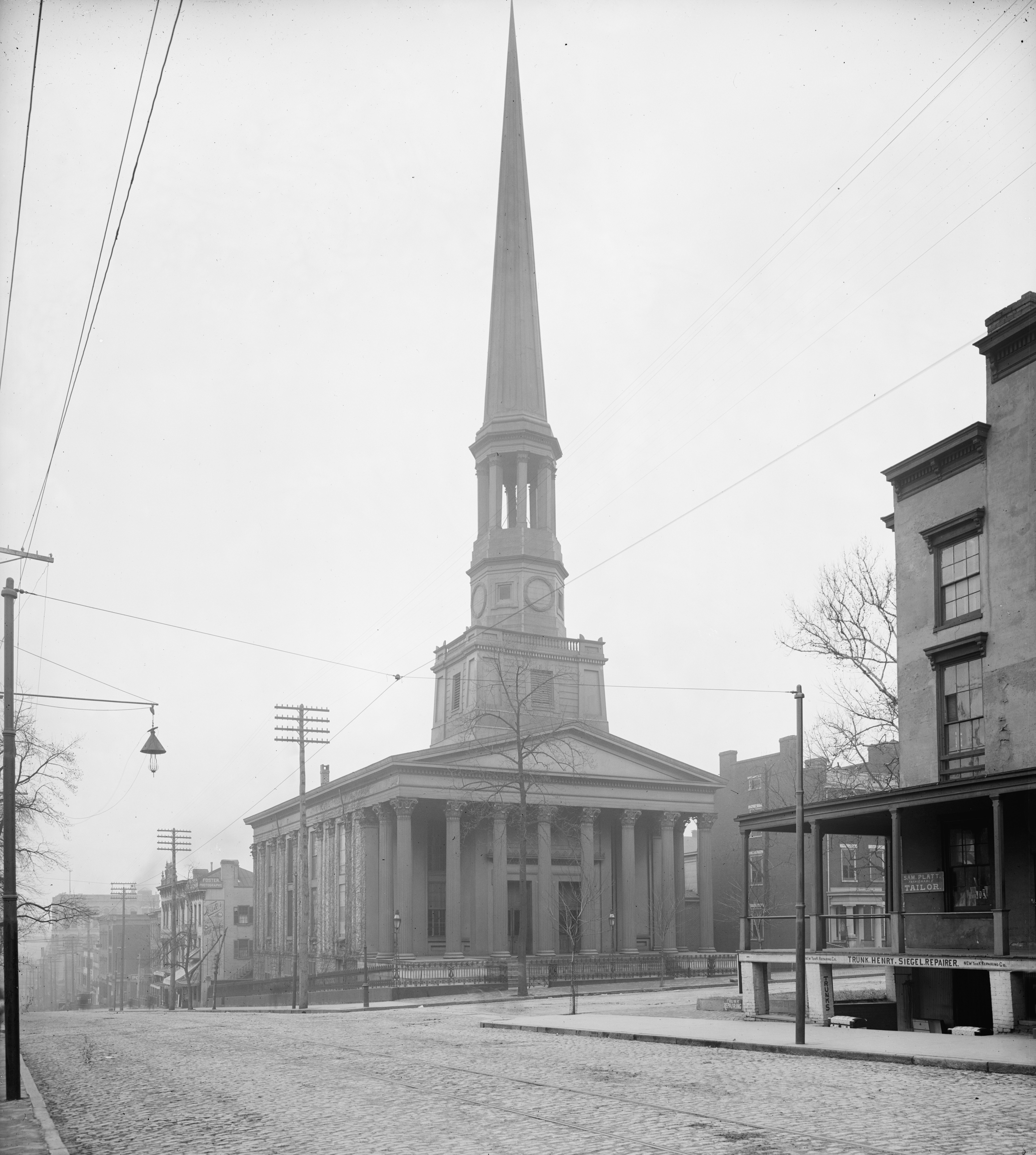
