= Walter Lawrence Jr. =

American surgeon (1925–2021)

- Born: May 31, 1925; Chicago, Illinois, U.S.
- Died: November 9, 2021 (aged 96)
- Other name: Walter M. Lawrence Jr.
- Occupation: Surgical oncologist
- Known for: Founding father of the discipline Surgical oncology

Academic background
- Education: Ph.B., S.B., M.D., University of Chicago; USN training, Dartmouth College; Internship and residency, Johns Hopkins Hospital; Residency, Memorial Sloan-Kettering Cancer Center

Walter Lawrence Jr. (May 31, 1925 – November 9, 2021) was an American surgical oncologist at Memorial-Sloan-Kettering Cancer Center, Cornell Medical College, and at the Medical College of Virginia. He was a leader in civil rights health equity efforts.

== Early life and education ==
Born on May 31, 1925, in Chicago, Illinois, Walter M. Lawrence Jr., was the son of Walter Lawrence, a primary care physician, and Violette (née Mathews) Lawrence. He attended Oak Park and River Forest High School and the University of Chicago, earning a Ph.B. in 1943, and an S.B. degree in 1945. He also attended Dartmouth College training and served in a non-combat role in the United States Navy during World War II from 1943 to 1946.

Lawrence wed Susan Grayson Shryock in Winchester, Virginia, on June 20, 1947. He earned his M.D. at the University of Chicago, with his dissertation, Constrictive Pericarditis with Obstruction of Pulmonary Veins, in 1948. He had surgical training residencies at Johns Hopkins Hospital and Memorial Sloan-Kettering Cancer Center, then served in the U.S. Army Medical Corps in Korea as Chief of Surgery of a MASH hospital from 1952 to 1954.

== Career ==
From 1956 to 1996, Lawrence conducted both clinical and research activity at Memorial-Sloan-Kettering Cancer Center of Cornell Medical College.

...Walter personally mentored many Black surgical oncologists, fighting the good fight to diversify our workforce, which back then was much more homogeneous than it is today...
Living in the former capital of the Confederacy, Walter witnessed racism on a daily basis.
When the Southern Surgical Association declined to admit his friend Dr. LaSalle Leffall, because he was Black, and the American Medical Association refused to intervene on Leffall's behalf, Walter resigned from both groups. Instead, he became a member of the Society of Black Academic Surgeons.

— Robert A. Winn and Gordon D. Ginder

=== Focus on issues of medical equity ===
Robert Winn wrote, "The real mark Dr. Lawrence leaves behind is his mission to help those less fortunate than us and to ensure that some do not bear the burden of health and cancer burden. And he never rested on this mission. Until last year, he was using his platform to speak on behalf of the least heard voices, ensuring that everyone has access to affordable, world-class healthcare."

Harry D. Bear wrote, "...he may be the only person admitted to the membership of the Southern Surgical Society twice. He resigned from this group when they would not admit an African American candidate; he was later re-admitted to the Southern after that black candidate had achieved membership some years later. This is a typical example of his sense of what is right. That is just one area where he has been a valued source of advice over the years."

=== Academic positions ===
In 1966, Lawrence became Vice-Chair of Surgery and Chair of the first academic Division of Surgical Oncology in the United States at the Medical College of Virginia. There he was also appointed Director of the NCI-accredited Massey Cancer Center, Medical College of Virginia, at the Virginia Commonwealth University (VCU) campus from 1974 to 1990. He served on the VCU School of Medicine Admissions Committee where his primary focus was also on medical school teaching. Later, the teaching portion of his career consisted entirely of medical student teaching at Hunter Holmes McGuire Veterans Administration Medical Center.

== Selected publications ==
According to Bear, "Lawrence's bibliography includes more than 260 papers on a wide variety of topics, as well as half a dozen books, and 35 book chapters."

=== Books ===
- Lawrence Jr., W.; Neifeld, J. P.; Terz, J. J. (December 6, 2012). Manual of Soft-Tissue Tumor Surgery. Springer Science & Business Media. ISBN 978-1-4612-5556-7.

=== Articles ===
- Lawrence, W; Donegan, W L; Natarajan, N; Mettlin, C; Beart, R; Winchester, D (April 1987). "Adult soft tissue sarcomas. A pattern of care survey of the American College of Surgeons". Annals of Surgery. 205 (4): 349–359. doi:10.1097/00000658-198704000-00003. ISSN 0003-4932. PMC 1492738. PMID 3566372.
- Lawrence, Walter; Anderson, James R.; Gehan, Edmund A.; Maurer, Harold (1997). "Pretreatment TNM staging of childhood rhabdomyosarcoma". Cancer. 80 (6): 1165–1170. doi:10.1002/(SICI)1097-0142(19970915)80:6<1165::AID-CNCR21>3.0.CO;2-5. ISSN 1097-0142. PMID 9305719. S2CID 37393818.
- McGrath, P C; Neifeld, J P; Lawrence, W; Kay, S; Horsley, J S; Parker, G A (December 1987). "Gastrointestinal sarcomas. Analysis of prognostic factors". Annals of Surgery. 206 (6): 706–710. doi:10.1097/00000658-198408000-00014. ISSN 0003-4932. PMC 1493319. PMID 3689007.
- Lawrence, W; Gehan, E A; Hays, D M; Beltangady, M; Maurer, H M (January 1, 1987). "Prognostic significance of staging factors of the UICC staging system in childhood rhabdomyosarcoma: a report from the Intergroup Rhabdomyosarcoma Study (IRS-II)". Journal of Clinical Oncology. 5 (1): 46–54. doi:10.1200/JCO.1987.5.1.46. ISSN 0732-183X. PMID 3543238.
- Lawrence, Walter; Hays, Daniel M.; Heyn, Ruth; Tefft, Melvin; Crist, William; Beltangady, Mohan; Newton, William; Wharam, Moody (1987). "Lymphatic metastases with childhood rhabdomyosarcoma. A report from the intergroup rhabdomyosarcoma study". Cancer. 60 (4): 910–915. doi:10.1002/1097-0142(19870815)60:4<910::AID-CNCR2820600433>3.0.CO;2-8. ISSN 1097-0142. PMID 3297302. S2CID 23003045.
- McGrath, P C; Neifeld, J P; Lawrence, W; DeMay, R M; Kay, S; Horsley, J S; Parker, G A (August 1984). "Improved survival following complete excision of retroperitoneal sarcomas". Annals of Surgery. 200 (2): 200–204. doi:10.1097/00000658-198408000-00014. ISSN 0003-4932. PMC 1250445. PMID 6465975.
- Parker, G A; Lawrence, W; Horsley, J S; Neifeld, J P; Cook, D; Walsh, J; Brewer, W; Koretz, M J (May 1989). "Intraoperative ultrasound of the liver affects operative decision making". Annals of Surgery. 209 (5): 569–577. doi:10.1097/00000658-198905000-00009. ISSN 0003-4932. PMC 1494086. PMID 2650644.
- Lawrence, Walter; Kaplan, Brian J. (2002). "Diagnosis and management of patients with thyroid nodules". Journal of Surgical Oncology. 80 (3): 157–170. doi:10.1002/jso.10115. ISSN 1096-9098. PMID 12115799. S2CID 42677195.
- Maurer, Harold M.; Moon, Thomas; Donaldson, Milton; Fernandez, Carlos; Gehan, Edmund A.; Hammond, Denman; Hays, Daniel M.; Lawrence, Walter; Newton, William; Ragab, Abdelsalam; Raney, Beverly (1977). "The intergroup rhabdomyosarcoma study. A preliminary report". Cancer. 40 (5): 2015–2026. doi:10.1002/1097-0142(197711)40:5<2015::AID-CNCR2820400505>3.0.CO;2-K. ISSN 1097-0142. PMID 336175. S2CID 39901938.

== Awards and honors ==
- 1944 Rufus Choate Scholar award from Dartmouth College
- 1964 Alfred P. Sloan Foundation Cancer Research award
- 1971 American Cancer Society professorship of clinical oncology
- 1988 University Award for Excellence from the Virginia Commonwealth University
- 1989 Massey Foundation: Walter Lawrence Jr. Distinguished Professorship in Oncology
- 1992 Virginia Cultural Laureate Award
- 1998 Beckstrand Cancer Foundation National Cancer Fighter of the Year, for "a lifetime of outstanding leadership and achievements in the war against cancer".
- 1999 President's Medal of the American Cancer Society
- 1999 Cancer Fighter of the Year Award from the Beckstrand Cancer Foundation
- 2000 Presidential Medallion from the Virginia Commonwealth University
- 2002 Lifetime Achievement in Science Award of the Science Museum of Virginia
- 2020 Honorary member of the American Society for Radiation Oncology

== See also ==
- List of surgeons
