= VCU Massey Comprehensive Cancer Center =

Nonprofit Organization

- Formation: 1974; 52 years ago
- Headquarters: Richmond, Virginia, U.S.
- Director: Robert A. Winn, M.D.
- Website: https://www.masseycancercenter.org/

Founded in 1974, VCU Massey Comprehensive Cancer Center is a non-profit organization part of Virginia Commonwealth University. Located in Richmond, Virginia, Virginia Commonwealth University is one of the nation's top research universities, and VCU Medical Center, a leading academic health system ranked Virginia's top hospital by U.S. News & World Report in 2012.

Massey is one of only 73 among 1,500 cancer centers in the country, and one of only two in Virginia, designated by the National Cancer Institute. This places Massey among the top four percent of cancer centers in the country.

They are a resource for cancer research, treatment and clinical trials as well as training of the region's oncologists.

== History ==
- 1838 - Hampden-Sydney College created the Medical Department.
- 1854 – The Medical Department became the Medical College of Virginia (MCV) after receiving an independent charter from the Virginia General Assembly.
- 1860 – MCV became state-affiliated.
- 1917 – The Richmond School of Social Work and Public Health was established on what is known today as VCU's Monroe Park Campus.
- 1925 – The Richmond School of Social Work and Public Health became the Richmond division of the College of William and Mary.
- 1939 – The Richmond School of Social Work and Public Health changed its name to Richmond Professional Institute.
- 1939 – A tumor board and a multidisciplinary tumor clinic were established at MCV.
- 1962 – Richmond Professional Institute separated from William and Mary to become an independent state institution.
- 1966 –The Divisions of Surgical Oncology and Medical Oncology were created within the Departments of Surgery and Medicine, respectively, at MCV.
- 1968 – MCV merged with the Richmond Professional Institute to form Virginia Commonwealth University (VCU); MCV became the health sciences campus of VCU, called the MCV Campus.
- 1974 – The VCU Board of Visitors established a cancer center on the MCV Campus and a planning grant was received from the National Cancer Institute (NCI).
- 1975 – The first Cancer Center Support Grant (CCSG) was funded by the NCI, with Walter Lawrence, Jr., M.D., a surgeon and former president of the American Cancer Society, as principal investigator and director of the cancer center.
- 1983 – The cancer center was named VCU Massey Cancer Center in honor of a major gift by William and Evan Massey.
- 1986 – North Hospital (renovated former E.G. Williams Hospital) opened, which today houses VCU Massey Cancer Center's Dalton Oncology Clinic, Radiation Oncology Department, BMT in-patient and out-patient clinics and Thomas Palliative Care Unit.
- 1987 – The Department of Radiation Oncology was established.
- 1988 – I. David Goldman, M.D., now director of Albert Einstein Cancer Center at Yeshiva University, became director of VCU Massey Cancer Center.
- 1993 – The Schools of Medicine and Basic Health Sciences merged.
- 1995 – Francis Macrina, Ph.D., now vice president for research at VCU School of Dentistry, became interim director of VCU Massey Cancer Center.
- 1997 – Gordon D. Ginder, M.D., former associate director of the University of Minnesota Cancer Center, became director of VCU Massey Cancer Center.
- 2006 – VCU Massey Cancer Center opened Goodwin Research Laboratory, an 80,000-square-foot, state-of-art cancer research facility.
- 2008 – VCU Medical Center opened the Critical Care Hospital, which includes VCU Massey Cancer Center's in-patient oncology care unit.
- 2019– Robert A. Winn M.D. became director of VCU Massey Cancer Center.
- 2023- Massey receives NCI designation as a comprehensive cancer center.
