= VCU School of Nursing =

Nursing school in Richmond, Virginia, US

Virginia Commonwealth University School of Nursing
- Type: Public university
- Dean: Patricia Kinser, Ph.D.
- Students: 850
- Location: 1100 E. Leigh Street, Richmond, Virginia, USA
- Campus: MCV Campus
- Website: http://www.nursing.vcu.edu/

The School of Nursing at Virginia Commonwealth University offers academic programs from the baccalaureate to doctoral level. Established in 1893, the School is part of a leading academic health sciences center on the Medical College of Virginia (MCV) Campus. Programs include: Baccalaureate: Traditional B.S., Accelerated B.S., and RN to B.S. (online); Master's - Family NP, Adult-gerontology Primary Care NP, Adult-gerontology Acute Care NP, Psychiatric and Mental Health NP, and Nursing Administration and Leadership (online); Post-master's Certificates; and Doctoral (both online) - Ph.D. and DNP (Doctor of Nursing Practice).

== History ==
The VCU School of Nursing was founded as the Virginia Hospital Training School for Nurses in the fall of 1893.

=== Sadie Heath Cabaniss ===
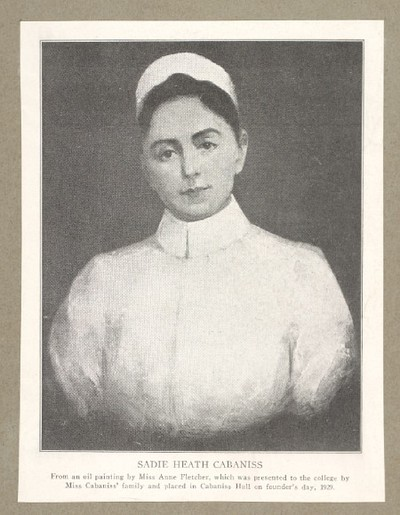
Sadie Heath Cabaniss

Although Miss Cabaniss was not the first director of the founding school, as the first superintendent of the Old Dominion Hospital Training School, she has been described as the initiator of professional nursing in Virginia. Miss Cabaniss entered Johns Hopkins University School of Nursing in Baltimore and after graduation in 1893 held the position of night supervisor until 1894. At the time, the Medical College of Virginia was looking for a nurse to take charge of the operating room. The school contacted Johns Hopkins University requesting assistance in the search. Isabell Hampton Robb, director of the School of Nursing at Johns Hopkins University and a mentor for Miss Cabaniss, selected her for this position. Miss Cabaniss took charge of the operating room at the Medical College of Virginia and under her leadership "order came out of chaos."

=== Admissions ===
The students admitted to the MCV schools of nursing came from all walks of life and from many states. It was not unusual for widows to study nursing in the late 1800s and early 1900s. Many students had been school teachers prior to entering nursing. The majority of the girls came from middle class or poor families. For some of these young women nursing was the only education their families could afford.

The requirements for admission to the MCV schools were similar to other schools of nursing young women between the ages of 21 and 35 were admitted if they had good character, good background, good general resistance, normal and stable mental and nervous makeup and a wholesome personality. Eight years of prior education was the norm for women who wanted to study nursing in the early 1900s.

=== Living Quarters ===
Prior to 1928 when old Cabaniss Hall dormitory was opened, living quarters left much to be desired. The students attending the Virginia Hospital Training School lived on the upper floor of Virginia Hospital, and they called it the "nurses' flats."

=== St. Philip School of Nursing ===
St. Philip Hospital opened in 1920. During the first quarter of the 20th century when southern law and social practice demanded separate facilities for the races, the Medical College of Virginia established a separate school of nursing for African-American women to provide trained personnel for the St. Philip Hospital. The St. Philip School of Nursing, although administered by the MCV School of Nursing, was operated as a separate entity. From its inception, it was on parity with the established white nursing school.

Both the Medical College of Virginia and St. Philip faculty taught were used by other programs because of the rich clinical facilities and high educational standards. As early as 1918 MCV offered experiences that were unavailable to these students in their own clinical facilities. The students received full maintenance for providing services to the MCV and St. Philip Hospitals. By 1960 it was necessary to discontinue the affiliation program because of faculty overload. With the advent of integration, it was no longer necessary to support two separate schools of nursing. The St. Philip School of Nursing was discontinued in 1962 and the schools combined.

=== Becoming VCU ===
The year the School of Nursing celebrated its 75th anniversary, in 1968, the General Assembly of Virginia by act of law established Virginia Commonwealth University (VCU) on July 1, with the Medical College of Virginia, the Health Sciences Division, and Richmond Professional Institute, the General Academic Division, as its component parts. The School of Nursing for Registered Nurses at the Richmond Professional Institute (RPI) and the Medical College of Virginia School of Nursing were consolidated.

As a result of the merger, no students were admitted to the RPI division after February 1969; and when the enrolled students completed their program, the Medical College of Virginia School of Nursing became the one school of nursing for Virginia Commonwealth University. The closing of the Richmond Professional Institute School of Nursing ended 52 years of that institution's providing education for nurses.

== Charting the Years of the VCU School of Nursing ==
- Virginia Hospital Training School (1893-1913)
- Old Dominion Hospital Training School (1895-1903)
- Memorial Hospital Training School (1903-1913)
- Virginia City Hospital Training School (1913-1922)
- School of Social Work and Public Health (1917-1943)
- St. Philip School of Nursing (1920-1962)
- Richmond Professional Institute; Richmond Division of the College of William and Mary (1926-1969)
- Medical College of Virginia (1913-1968)
- Virginia Commonwealth University School of Nursing (1968–Present day)

== Rankings ==
Currently, the School is ranked 14 nationally in NIH funding.
