= Robert Winn =

Robert Winn may refer to:

- Robert W. Winn, American politician from Missouri
- Robert A. Winn, American pulmonologist
- Bob Winn, American distance runner, coach, and local politician
