= History of Virginia Commonwealth University =

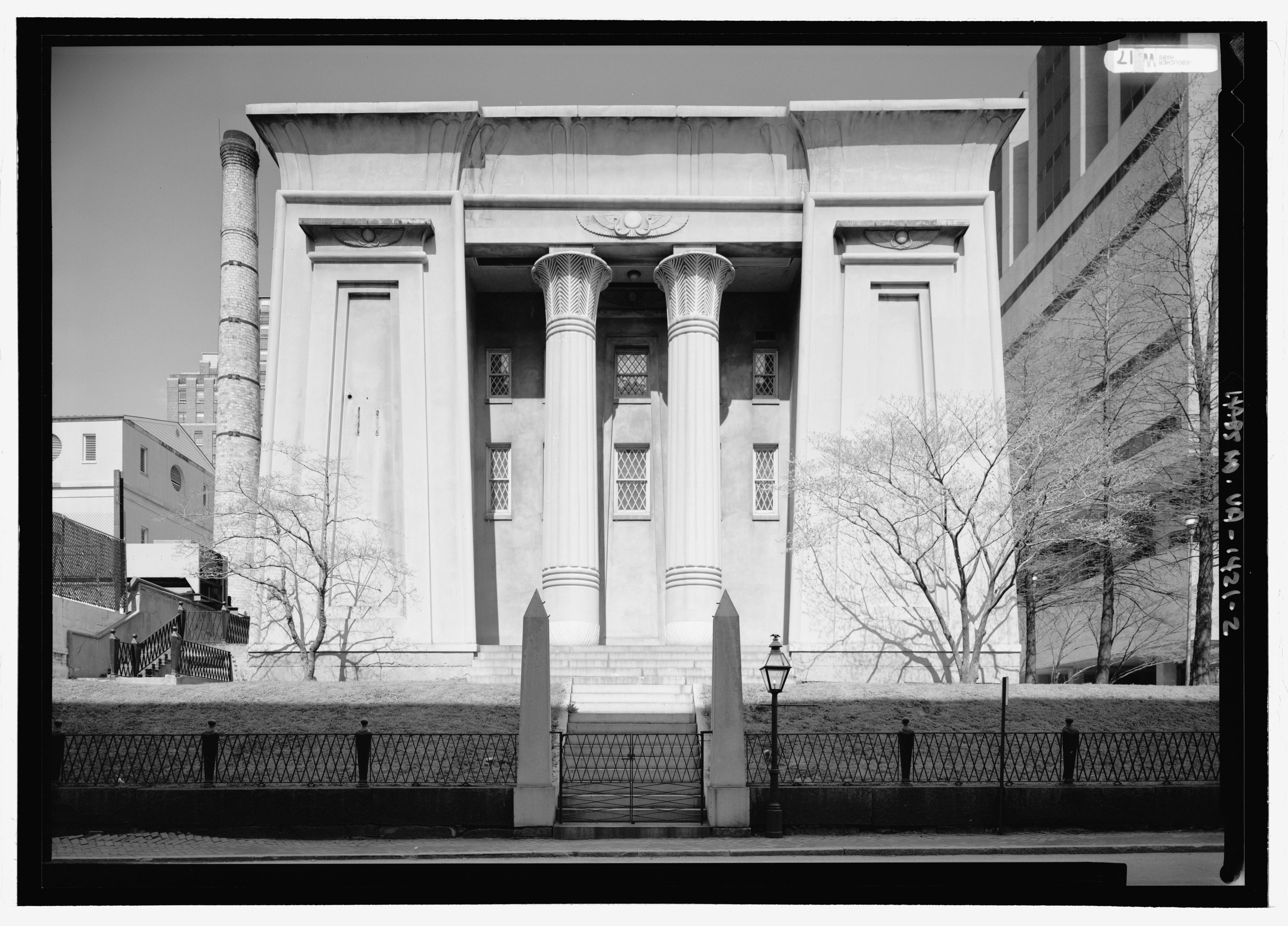
The Egyptian Building

The history of Virginia Commonwealth University began in 1838, when the Medical College of Virginia was founded. In 1967 the Medical College of Virginia and the Richmond Professional Institute merged to become one, single university in Richmond, Virginia. Five presidents have served the institution since its merger and creation. VCU's medical school is the oldest continually operating medical school in the South; it created the first school of social work in the South; and it has the only school of dentistry in Virginia

== Early years ==
=== Medical College of Virginia ===
The origins of Virginia Commonwealth University begin in 1838, which was when the Medical department of Hampden-Sydney College was founded. By 1844, the Egyptian Building was erected, serving as the main building for the Hampden-Sydney Medical Department. The name "Egyptian Building" was coined due to its Egyptian revival style of architecture. Today, the Egyptian Building is the oldest building at VCU.

While initially serving as a part of Hampden-Sydney, the department received an independent charter from the Virginia General Assembly in 1854 to become its own independent institution of higher learning. Subsequently, the department was rebranded as the Medical College of Virginia. The newly named Medical College (MCV) became a state-funded college in 1860, in return for a $30,000 appropriation. As a public school, the school has its first hospital constructed on campus the following year.

As the Civil War began, Richmond became a focal point for battle and politics. After a long siege, Ulysses S. Grant captured Petersburg and Richmond in early April 1865. As the fall of Petersburg became imminent, on Evacuation Sunday (April 2), President Davis, his cabinet, and the Confederate defenders abandoned Richmond and fled south. The retreating soldiers were under orders to set fire to bridges, the armory, and supply warehouses as they left. The fire in the largely abandoned city spread out of control; the fire and Union shelling destroyed large parts of Richmond and virtually all the MCV's buildings. The city surrendered the next day; Union troops put out the raging fires in the city. Because of the worthless Confederate currency and high inflation, the medical school sold its ambulance horse for enough money to continue operation.

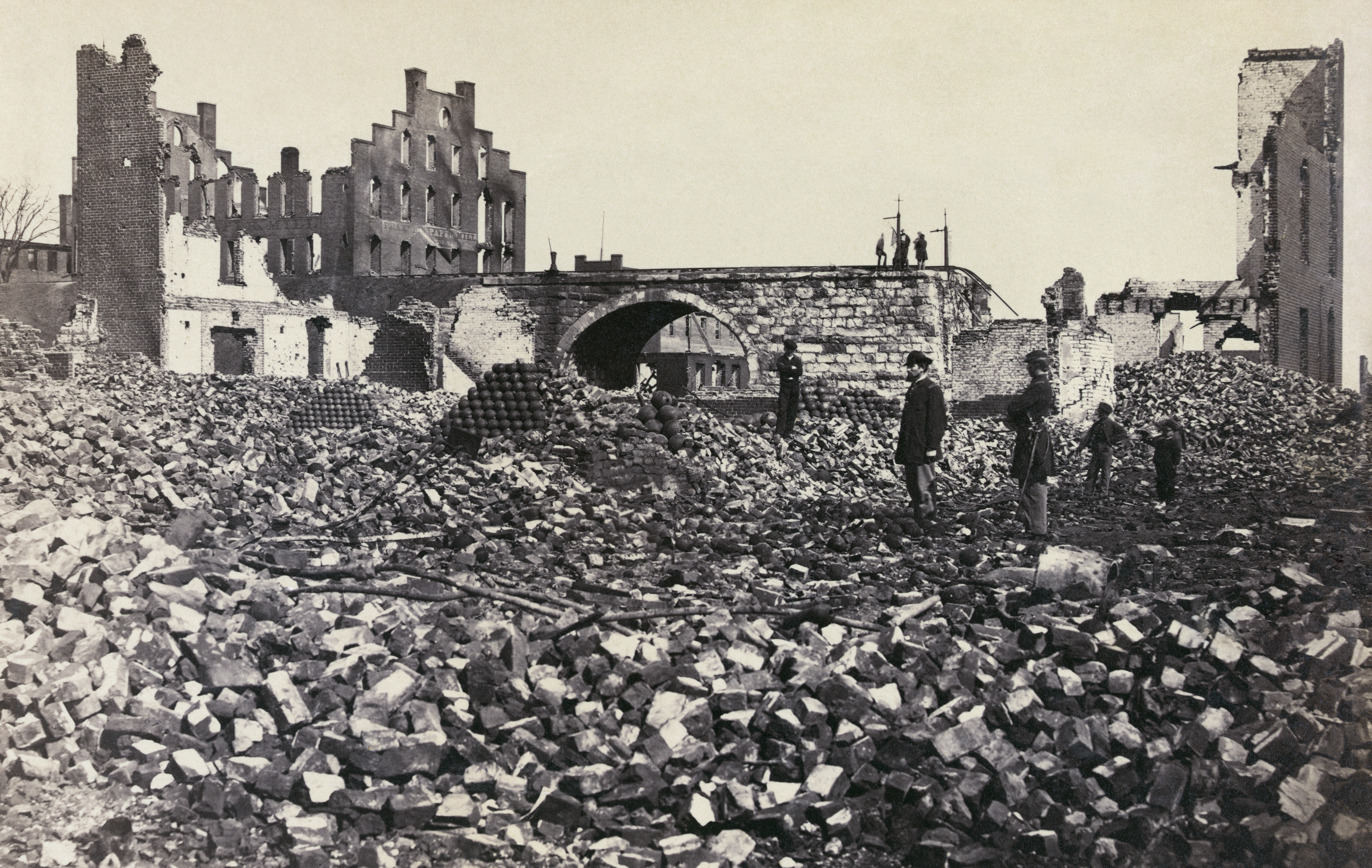
Richmond after the Civil War

After the Civil War MCV participated significantly in medical advances, including in anesthesia and antisepsis. In 1893, the College of Physicians and Surgeons, later University College of Medicine, was established by Hunter Holmes McGuire, Stonewall Jackson's friend and personal doctor who had amputated Jackson's arm, just three blocks away from MCV. In 1912, McGuire Hall opened as the new home of the University College of Medicine. The following year, MCV and UCM merged through the efforts of George Ben Johnston and Stuart McGuire. MCV acquired the Memorial Hospital as a result of the merger.

Throughout the American Civil War, the MCV was of note in the Confederacy for remaining open and have a graduating class each year of the Civil War. The MCV is the only existing school in the Southern United States to have this special distinction. Closing out the 1860s, the school opened its first outpatient clinic.

By 1879, the General Assembly granted the MCV the right to grant students degrees in Pharmacy. In the 1890s, several major additions to the MCV were added, such as the Pharmacy University College in 1893, the School of Dentistry in 1895, and the School of Pharmacy in 1898.

=== Richmond Professional Institute ===
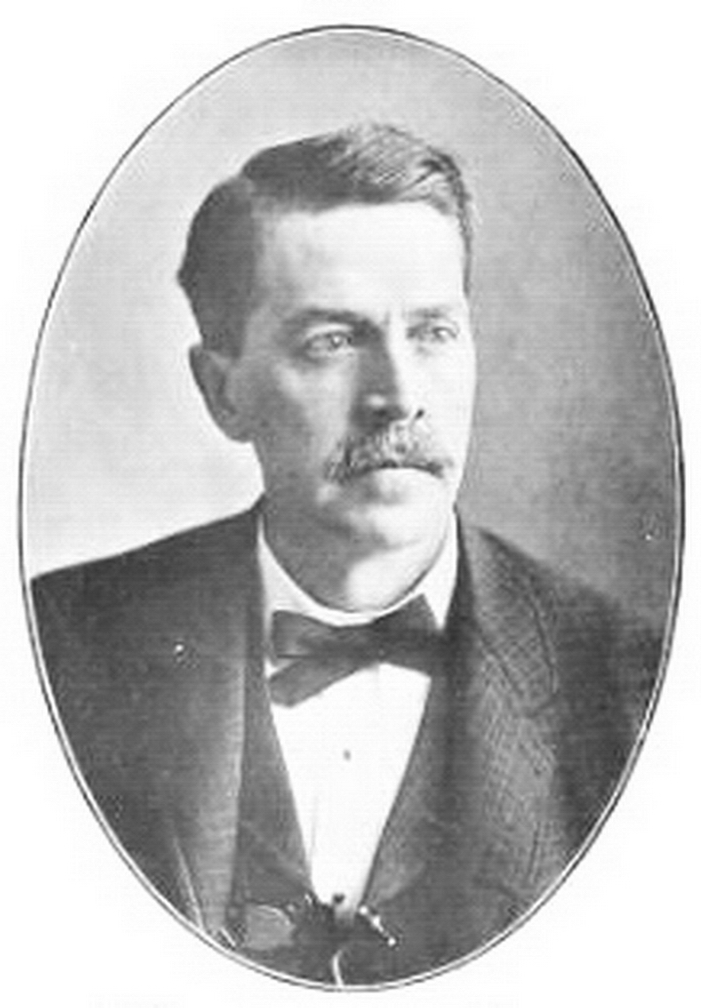
Hunter McGuire

The first steps toward the establishment of a training school for social workers in Richmond, Virginia were taken under the auspices of the Bureau of Vocations for Women, headed by Orie Latham Hatcher. The first planning meeting, chaired by Virginia Spotswood McKenney, was held on October 21, 1916. A board of directors was chosen for the Richmond School of Social Economy by December and in January 1917 the board decided to open the new school in October with a two-year curriculum. At this time, the school operated out of offices adjoining the office of the Bureau of Vocations.

In July 1917, Henry H. Hibbs, Jr. was offered and accepted the directorship of the Richmond School of Social Economy. The school opened on October 11, 1917 with 30 students, all of whom were women. Of the 30 students, 7 were involved in social work and 23 in public health nursing. The school also became a site for a Red Cross Home Service Institute, training women to lead volunteers in support of families of soldiers and sailors serving in World War I.

Reverend Scherer secured the first home for the Richmond School of Social Work and Public Health on the third floor of an old brick residence in Capitol Square across from the Governor's mansion at 1112 Capitol Street. At the time nothing suggested a professional school, college, or university in the area and on the building the sign read "Richmond Juvenile and Domestic Relations Court." In 1920, RPI opened its doors to both men and women, but the first man did not enroll until 1927.

In 1925, the school became the Richmond Division of the College of William and Mary because of $10,000 in support given to RPI each year. In the transition to becoming a public institution from 1925 to 1940, the school was one of the few "state-supported colleges" in the country operating almost entirely without state support. The lack of funding was due mainly to a popular belief that Virginia already had too many public universities and that leaders in Virginia believed the only proper location for a college or university was in a small town and not in an urban environment. With the support from The College of William and Mary, it acquired 827 West Franklin Street (now known as Founder's Hall). The building was purchased for $73,000 and $23,000 was needed for repairs.

VCU's early varsity logo

When the Great Depression hit and RPI continued to receive no state support, the federal government stepped in to fill the gap. With the help of the Works Progress Administration, many of the buildings were renovated during the depression. Hibbs said:

That if it had not been for the WPA, the Richmond Professional Institute would not have amounted to much. In the days before the legislature made appropriations to RPI the WPA enabled us to survive and even grow a little. In 1939 the school was renamed the Richmond Professional Institute of the College of William and Mary.

In 1928, Hibbs hired the Richmond-born Theresa Pollak as the first full-time art instructor. She founded the School of Art, the forerunner to the VCU School of the Arts. There were 8 full-time students the first year and 25 or 30 part-time students.

When RPI became VCU in 1968, the School of the Arts was the largest professional art school in the country, with 1,200 full-time undergraduate students and 75 graduate students.

RPI suffered from having a campus with no new buildings that instead consisted entirely of renovated houses. This in turn hurt RPI's reputation so the first new buildings were created in the late 1950s to improve its image. In 1956, Franklin Street Gym became the first new building constructed on RPI's campus. This building was later razed in 2020 to make way for the College of Humanities and Sciences' STEM Building at 817 W. Franklin St.

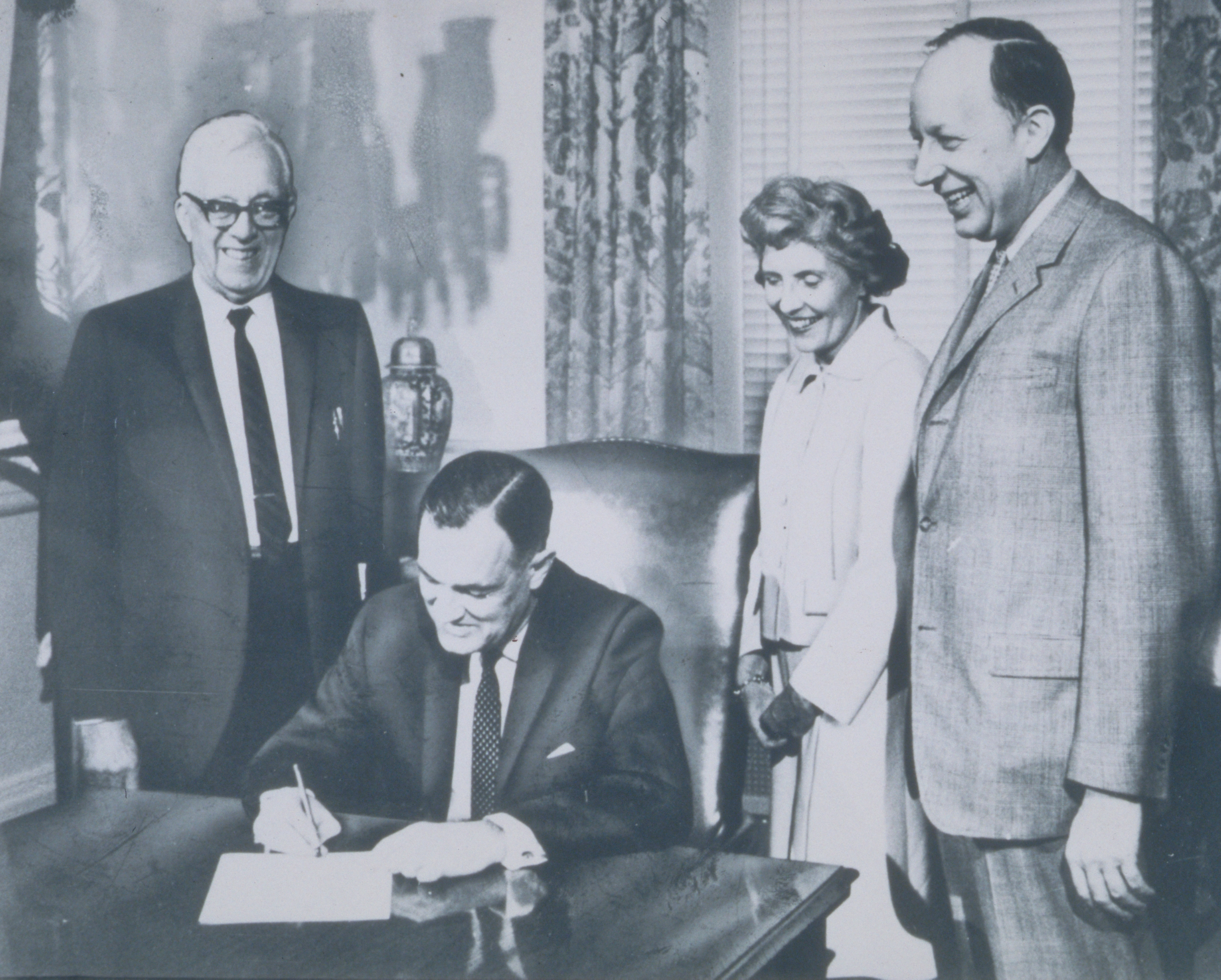
Then-Virginia governor, Mills Godwin, signing a bill allowing the merger of RPI and MCV, thus creating Virginia Commonwealth University

In RPI's 1953 pamphlet, An Entirely Different College, Hibbs defined a professional institute as a college or university that arranged most of its programs of study around occupations or professions. Not abiding to the traditional university system, RPI gained a reputation as a unique institution in conservative Virginia. This uniqueness found its way into many of the art and literature students during the 1950s and 1960s as they adopted the beatnik look and dress style. When George Oliver took over as president in 1959, he did not believe that RPI still needed the name recognition that William and Mary brought. This, along with growing radicalism among the students and faculty of RPI, began to sever the relationship with the parent school.

Richmond Professional Institute became an independent state university for the first time in 1962 and took on the name Rams. In his inaugural address as VCU's first president, November 10, 1970, Warren W. Brandt itemized some of VCU's special educational benefits to the urban community which it serves as a responsive citizen:

- Provide special programs for those working on urban problems
- Teach how to live more effectively in the urban environment
- Offer special material to make students aware of urban problems
- Provide a faculty with expertise in a wide variety of relevant specialties
- Furnish a large group of dedicated volunteer workers; faculty, students, and staff
- Provide health care to a large number residents of Richmond and most of Virginia
