= Mary Elizabeth Carnegie =

American nurse and educator

Mary Elizabeth Carnegie (19 April 1916 – 20 February 2008) was an American educator and author in the field of nursing. Known for breaking down racial barriers, she was the first black nurse to serve as a voting member on the board of a state nursing association. She was later president of the American Academy of Nursing and edited the journal Nursing Research.

== Early life ==
Carnegie was born in Baltimore, Maryland, United States, received a diploma from the Lincoln School for Nurses, bachelor's degree from West Virginia State College, master's degree from Syracuse University, and doctor of public administration degree from New York University.

== Career ==
After receiving her bachelor's degree from West Virginia State College, Carnegie took a job in a hospital in Richmond, Virginia. She became a clinical instructor at St. Philip School of Nursing. While working at St. Philip, Carnegie was exposed to a different social system in the nursing world in the south.

Carnegie joined the Florida Association of Colored Graduate Nurses (FACGN) in 1945. She was elected president of the organization three years later. Traditionally, the FACGN was named a courtesy (non-voting) board member of the Florida State Nurses Association the next year. After Carnegie's service with the FACGN, the FSNA board decided to grant her full rights and responsibilities on their board. She was the first black nurse to serve on the board of a state nursing association.

Between 1945 and 1953, Carnegie was a professor and dean of the nursing school at Florida A&M University. She later served as president of the American Academy of Nursing and the editor of Nursing Research. She was awarded eight honorary doctorates and was inducted into the hall of fame of the American Nurses Association. She was inducted into the Virginia Nursing Hall of Fame in 2009. She was named a Living Legend by the American Academy of Nursing in 1994.

After developing hypertensive cardiovascular disease, Carnegie died in 2008 in Chevy Chase, Maryland. She had lived there for 25 years and had been married once; her husband died in 1954.

== See also ==
- Carnegie (disambiguation)
- List of Living Legends of the American Academy of Nursing
