= List of Chi Eta Phi chapters =

Chi Eta Phi is an American professional service organization for registered professional nurses and student nurses, representing many cultures and diverse ethnic backgrounds. It has both graduate and undergraduate chapters.

== Graduate chapters ==
In the following list of graduate chapters, active chapters are indicated in bold and inactive chapters are in italics.

Chapter	Charter date and range	Location	Status	Ref.
**Alpha**	October 16, 1932	Washington, D.C.	Active	
**Delta**	June 8, 1937	Los Angeles, California	Active	
**Epsilon**	May 3, 1939	Tuskegee, Alabama	Active	
**Eta**	November 19, 1939	Norfolk, Virginia	Active	
**Gamma**	April 26, 1946	Baltimore, Maryland	Active	
**Zeta**	April 29, 1946	Richmond, Virginia	Active	
**Theta**	April 1948	Philadelphia, Pennsylvania	Active	
**Iota**	May 22, 1948	Charlotte, North Carolina	Active	
**Kappa**	May 1, 1949	Pittsburgh, Pennsylvania	Active	
**Lambda**	September 5, 1951	Asheville, North Carolina	Active	
Mu			Inactive	
**Nu**	December 5, 1952	Miami, Florida	Active	
**Xi**	June 5, 1953	Birmingham, Alabama	Active	
**Omicron**	September 26, 1954	New York City, New York	Active	
**Pi**	April 30, 1955	Durham, North Carolina	Active	
**Rho**	March 30, 1956	St Louis, Missouri	Active	
**Sigma**	October 11, 1958	Jacksonville, Florida	Active	
**Tau**	March 30, 1957	Hampton, Virginia	Active	
Upsilon (see **Xi Phi**)	1959	Dallas, Texas	Reestablished	
Phi	May 30, 1959	Tampa, Floria	Inactive	
Chi	1958	Hartford, Connecticut	Inactive	
Psi	1959	Martinsville, Virginia	Inactive	
**Omega**	May 13, 1961	Suffolk, Virginia	Active	
**Alpha Chi**	May 27, 1961	Nashville, Tennessee	Active	
**Gamma Chi**	July 21, 1962	Atlanta, Georgia	Active	
Delta Chi	October 13, 1962	Macon, Georgia	Inactive	
Beta Chi	April 26, 1963	Memphis, Tennessee	Inactive	
Epsilon Chi			Inactive	
**Zeta Chi**	November 29, 1963	Houston, Texas	Active	
**Eta Chi**	April 24, 1965	Indianapolis, Indiana	Active	
**Theta Chi**	May 22, 1965	Queens, New York	Active	
**Iota Chi**	1965	Bronx, New York	Active	
**Kappa Chi**	October 30, 1965	Columbus, Georgia	Active	
**Lambda Chi**	November 13, 1965	Detroit, Michigan	Active	
**Mu Chi**	May 7, 1966	Los Angeles, California	Active	
**Nu Chi**	May 28, 1966	Cleveland, Ohio	Active	
Xi Chi	April 19, 1968	Monrovia, Liberia	Inactive	
**Omicron Chi**	April 19, 1969	Charleston, South Carolina	Active	
Pi Chi		Mount Bayou, Mississippi	Inactive	
Rho Kappa		Inactive		
**Sigma Chi**	November 20, 1971	Greensboro, North Carolina	Active	
**Tau Chi**	May 27, 1972	Somerset, New Jersey	Active	
**Upsilon Chi**	September 6, 1975	Knoxville, Tennessee	Active	
**Rho Chi**	May 29, 1971	New Orleans, Louisiana	Active	
**Phi Chi**	May 21, 1977	Augusta, Georgia	Active	
**Chi Chi**	September 23, 1978	Winston-Salem, North Carolina	Active	
**Psi Chi**	May 12, 1979	Salisbury, North Carolina	Active	
**Omega Chi**	May 26, 1979	Brooklyn, New York	Active	
**Alpha Eta**	May 24, 1980	Chicago, Illinois	Active	
**Gamma Eta**	March 13, 1982	Columbus, Ohio	Active	
**Delta Eta**	June 19, 1982	Columbia, South Carolina	Active	
Epsilon Eta			Inactive	
**Zeta Eta**	October 8, 1983	Fort Wayne, Indiana	Active	
**Eta Eta**	April 14, 1984	Petersburg, Virginia	Active	
**Theta Eta**	December 8, 1984	San Antonio, Texas	Active	
**Iota Eta**	1985	Denver, Colorado	Active	
**Kappa Eta**	September 27, 1986	Nassau and Suffolk Counties, New York	Active	
**Lambda Eta**	October 11, 1986	Dallas and Fort Worth, Texas	Active	
**Mu Eta**	October 10, 1987	Saint Thomas, U.S. Virgin Islands	Active	
Nu Eta	March 18, 1989	West Palm Beach, Florida	Inactive	
Xi Eta	October 14, 1989	Orangeburg, South Carolina	Inactive	
Omicron Eta		Tampa, Florida	Inactive	
Pi Eta	1989	Atlantic City, New Jersey	Inactive	
**Rho Eta**	December 2, 1989	Selma, Alabama	Active	
**Sigma Eta**	March 24, 1990	Montgomery, Alabama	Active	
**Tau Eta**	September 29, 1990	Wilmington, Delaware	Active	
**Upsilon Eta**	January 26, 1991	Oklahoma City, Oklahoma	Active	
**Phi Eta**	May 18, 1991	Ocala, Florida	Active	
Chi Eta			Inactive	
**Psi Eta**	June 8, 1991	Long Beach, California	Active	
Omega Eta	December 14, 1991	Port Charlotte, Florida	Inactive	
**Alpha Phi**	1992	Stockton, California	Active	
**Gamma Phi**	1992	Lawnside, New Jersey	Active	
Delta Phi	May 13, 1993	Greenville, South Carolina	Inactive	
Epsilon Phi	1993	New York City, New York	Inactive	
**Zeta Phi**	June 5, 1993	Lexington, Kentucky	Active	
**Eta Phi**	October 9, 1993	Mobile, Alabama	Active	
**Theta Phi**	October 23, 1993	Auburn, Alabama	Active	
**Iota Phi**	1993	Portsmouth, Virginia	Active	
**Kappa Phi**	January 22, 1994	Florence, Alabama	Active	
**Lambda Phi**	March 19, 1994	Bowie, Maryland	Active	
**Mu Phi**	February 25, 1995	Stone Mountain, Georgia	Active	
**Nu Phi**	April 15, 1995	Waukegan, Illinois	Active	
**Xi Phi** (see Upsilon)	May 6, 1995	Dallas, Texas	Active	
Omicron Phi			Inactive	
Pi Phi	1997	New York City, New York	Inactive	
**Rho Phi**	March 14, 1998	Raleigh, North Carolina	Active	
**Sigma Phi**	September 12, 1998	Waco and McLennan County, Texas	Active	
Tau Phi	1998	Rockland, New York	Inactive	
**Upsilon Phi**	September 25, 1999	Florence and Darlington, South Carolina	Active	
**Phi Phi**	December 9, 2000	Sumter, South Carolina	Active	
**Chi Phi**	June 30, 2001	Tallahassee, Florida	Active	
**Psi Phi**	August 2, 2002	Baton Rouge, Louisiana	Active	
Omega Phi			Inactive	
**Alpha Chi Chi**	November 20, 2004	Florissant, Missouri	Active	
**Beta Chi Chi**	2005	Rochester, New York	Active	
**Gamma Chi Chi**	November 3, 2007	Nacogdoches, Texas	Active	
**Delta Chi Chi**	February 23, 2008	Jacksonville, Florida	Active	
Epsilon Chi Chi	2011	Suffolk County, New York	Inactive	
**Zeta Chi Chi**	May 28, 2011	Savannah, Georgia	Active	
Eta Chi Chi			Inactive	
**Theta Chi Chi**	May 30, 2015	Milwaukee, Wisconsin	Active	
**Iota Chi Chi**	June 27, 2015	Flint, Michigan	Active	
**Kappa Chi Chi**	2015	Honolulu, Hawaii	Active	
**Lambda Chi Chi**	August 22, 2015	Oakland, California	Active	
**Mu Chi Chi**	September 10, 2015	Pine Bluff, Arkansas	Active	
**Nu Chi Chi**	October 31, 2015	Westchester, NY	Active	
**Xi Chi Chi**	November 14, 2015	Hattiesburg, Mississippi	Active	
Omicron Chi Chi		White Plains, New York	Inactive	
**Pi Chi Chi**	February 20, 2016	Little Rock, Arkansas	Active	
**Rho Chi Chi**	March 19, 2016	Columbia, Maryland	Active	
**Sigma Chi Chi**	February 2, 2016	Bryant, Arkansas	Active	
**Tau Chi Chi**	May 14, 2016	Zachary and Clinton, Louisiana	Active	
Upsilon Chi Chi			Inactive	
**Phi Chi Chi**	June 18, 2016	Vicksburg, Mississippi	Active	
**Chi Chi Chi**	July 16, 2016	Memphis, Tennessee	Active	
**Psi Chi Chi**	August 6, 2016	Chattanooga, Tennessee	Active	
**Omega Chi Chi**	August 27, 2016	Macon, Georgia	Active	
**Alpha Eta Eta**	September 24, 2016	Ann Arbor, Michigan	Active	
**Beta Eta Eta**	November 19, 2016	Mendenhall, Mississippi	Active	
**Gamma Eta Eta**	May 20, 2017	Clinton, North Carolina	Active	
**Delta Eta Eta**	June 3, 2017	Cincinnati, Ohio	Active	
**Epsilon Eta Eta**	September 9, 2017	Kansas City, Kansas	Active	
**Zeta Eta Eta**	September 16, 2017	Orangeburg, South Carolina	Active	
**Eta Eta Eta**	June 8, 2019	Las Vegas, Nevada	Active	
**Theta Eta Eta**	November 16, 2019	Bucks County, Pennsylvania	Active	

== Undergraduate chapters ==
In the following list of undergraduate chapters, active chapters are indicated in bold and inactive chapters are in italics.

Chapter	Charter date and range	Institution	Location	Status	Ref.
Alpha Beta	1935–19xx ?	Freedmen's Hospital School of Nursing	Washington, D.C.	Inactive	(Note: The Freeman's Hospital School of Nursing transferred to Howard University by an Act of Congress in 1968 and closed in 1973.)
Gamma Alpha	1953	Provident Hospital School of Nursing	Baltimore, Maryland	Inactive	
**Epsilon Beta**	January 26, 1952	Tuskegee University	Tuskegee, Alabama	Active	
Zeta Beta	1957–1962	St. Philip School of Nursing	Richmond, Virginia	Inactive	(Note: The Nursing School graduated its last class in 1962.)
**Tau Beta**	March 30, 1957 – 19xx ?; 1976	Hampton University	Hampton, Virginia	Active	
Omicron Beta Alpha	1957–19xx ?	Harlem Hospital School of Nursing	New York City, New York	Inactive	(Note: The Harlem Hospital School of Nursing closed in 1977.)
Theta Beta	1958–1960	Mercy-Douglass Hospital School of Nursing	Philadelphia, Pennsylvania	Inactive	(Note: The Mercy-Douglass Hospital School of Nursing closed in 1960.)
Omicron Beta Beta	1959	Lincoln Hospital	Bronx, New York	Inactive	
Theta Beta Beta	1968	Einstein Medical Center	Philadelphia, Pennsylvania	Inactive	
Phi Beta	December 11, 1971	North Carolina Central University	Durham, North Carolina	Inactive	
**Zeta Chi Beta**	May 20, 1972	Prairie View A&M University	Prairie View, Texas	Active	
**Lambda Chi Beta**	June 23, 1972	Wayne State University	Detroit, Michigan	Active	
Alpha Beta Alpha	1973	Washington Technical Institute	Washington, D.C.	Inactive	
Alpha Beta Beta	1973	Federal City College	Washington, D.C.	Inactive	
**Lambda Chi Alpha Beta**	August 25, 1973	University of Michigan	Ann Arbor, Michigan	Active	
**Eta Chi Beta**	April 26, 1974	Indiana University	Indianapolis, Indiana	Active	
Sigma Chi Beta	April 4, 1975	North Carolina A&T State University	Greensboro, North Carolina	Inactive	
Omicron Gamma Beta	1977	Kingsborough Community College	Brooklyn, New York	Inactive	
Alpha Gamma Beta	1979	University of the District of Columbia	Washington, D.C.	Inactive	
**Alpha Delta Beta**	1982	Howard University	Washington, D.C.	Active	
**Kappa Beta**	January 28, 1984	University of Pittsburgh	Pittsburgh, Pennsylvania	Active	
**Theta Gamma Beta**	1987	Philadelphia Citywide	Philadelphia, Pennsylvania	Active	
Phi Chi Beta	February 28, 1987	Medical College of Georgia	Augusta, Georgia	Inactive	
**Chi Chi Beta**	March 16, 1991	Winston-Salem State University	Winston-Salem, North Carolina	Active	
**Gamma Alpha Beta**	March 23, 1991	Coppin State College	Baltimore, Maryland	Active	
Theta Phi Beta	October 23, 1993	Auburn University	Auburn, Alabama	Inactive	
Omicron Delta Beta	1993	Brooklyn Citywide	Brooklyn, New York	Inactive	
Kappa Eta Beta	1993	Molloy College	Rockville Centre, New York	Inactive	
Delta Eta Beta	March 28, 1996 – May 2014	South Carolina State University	Orangeburg, South Carolina	Inactive	(Note: The chapter went dormant when South Carolina State University ended its nursing program.)
**Eta Beta**	April 15, 1995	Norfolk State University	Norfolk, Virginia	Active	
Delta Phi Beta	April 23, 1995	Clemson University	Clemson, South Carolina	Inactive	
**Lambda Chi Beta Beta**	April 28, 1995	University of Detroit Mercy	Detroit, Michigan	Active	
**Kappa Alpha Beta**	1996	Duquesne University	Pittsburgh, Pennsylvania	Active	
**Delta Eta Alpha Beta**	1996	University of South Carolina	Columbia, South Carolina	Active	
**Theta Chi Beta**	February 21, 1998	Long Island University	Brooklyn, New York	Active	
**Sigma Chi Alpha Beta**	1999	University of North Carolina at Greensboro	Greensboro, North Carolina	Active	
Tau Eta Beta	1999	Wilmington Citywide	Wilmington, Delaware	Inactive	
Gamma Beta Beta	2000	University of Maryland, Baltimore School of Nursing	Baltimore, Maryland	Inactive	
**Phi Chi Alpha Beta**	August 6, 2002	Augusta University	Augusta, Georgia	Active	
**Chi Phi Beta**	February 23, 2003	Florida A&M University	Tallahassee, Florida	Active	
**Psi Phi Beta**	August 2, 2003	Southern University	Baton Rouge, Louisiana	Active	
Kappa Beta Beta	2004	Carlow University	Pittsburgh, Pennsylvania	Inactive	
**Rho Beta**	May 8, 2004	Goldfarb School of Nursing at Barnes-Jewish College	St Louis, Missouri	Active	
Theta Delta Beta	April 1, 2006 – 2002	Villanova University College of Nursing	Villanova, Pennsylvania	Inactive	
**Lambda Phi Beta**	May 6, 2006	Bowie State University	Bowie, Maryland	Active	
Tau Eta Alpha Beta	2006	Delaware State University	Dover, Delaware	Inactive	
**Beta Chi Chi Beta**	2008	Rochester Citywide	Rochster, New York	Active	(Note: Includes Finger Lakes College of Health, Nazareth College, Roberts Weslyan College, St. John Fisher College, State University at Brockport, and University of Rochester.)
**Kappa Chi Alpha Beta**	April 7, 2012	Columbus State University	Columbus, Georgia	Active	
**Lambda Eta Alpha Beta**	December 1, 2012	Texas Christian University	Fort Worth, Texas	Active	
**Tau Chi Beta**	2014	Seton Hall University	South Orange, New Jersey	Active	
**Rho Beta**		St. Louis Citywide	St. Louis, Missouri	Active	
Mu Phi Beta		Georgia State University	Atlanta, Georgia	Inactive	
**Xi Phi Beta**		Dallas Citywide	Dallas, Texas	Active	
Kappa Chi Beta				Inactive	
