= Virginia College of Medicine =

Virginia College of Medicine may refer to:

- University of Virginia
- University of West Virginia, College of Medicine
- Medical College of Virginia
