= List of surgeons =

These are lists of notable surgeons.

== Pioneers and firsts to perform particular procedures ==
- Silvano Raia (born 1930), Raia was the first surgeon to achieve a successful living donor liver transplantation in July 1989
- B. K. Misra (born 1953), First neurosurgeon in the world to perform image-guided surgery for aneurysms, first in South Asia to perform stereotactic radiosurgery, first in India to perform awake craniotomy and laparoscopic spine surgery.
- Claudius Amyand (1680–1740), performed the first Appendicectomy
- Christiaan Barnard (1922–2001), cardiac surgery, first heart transplantation
- William DeVries (born 1943), first permanent artificial heart transplant
- Eric Mühe (1938–2005), first laparoscopic cholecystectomy
- Paul Randall Harrington (1911–1980), first interior fixation of the spine by means of a Harrington rod.
- John Heysham Gibbon (1903–1973), first open heart surgery
- Simon Hullihen (1810–1857), The Father of Oral Surgery
- John Hunter (1728–1793), first aneurysm operation and founder of early schools of anatomy
- Leonard B. Kaban, Walter C. Guralnick Professor and Chair of the Department of Oral and Maxillofacial Surgery at the Massachusetts General Hospital/Harvard University, pioneer in oral, maxillofacial and craniofacial surgery
- Frederic E. Mohs (1910–2002), developed the Mohs Micrographic Surgery technique (MMS) aka Mohs surgery in 1938 to remove skin cancer lesions.
- Dallas B. Phemister (1882–1951), developed the Phemister graft and early innovator in orthopedics
- Theodore H. Schwartz (born 1965), first center in New York City to use intraoperative MRI scanning during endoscopic pituitary surgery
- Lall Sawh (born 1951), C.M.T., F.R.C.S.(Edin.). Kidney transplantation pioneer in the Caribbean and Latin America. Early proponent of Viagra.
- Michael Woodruff (1911–2001), transplantation pioneer.
- Sergelen Orgoi developed low cost liver transplantation for developing countries

== Researchers and inventors in the field of surgery ==
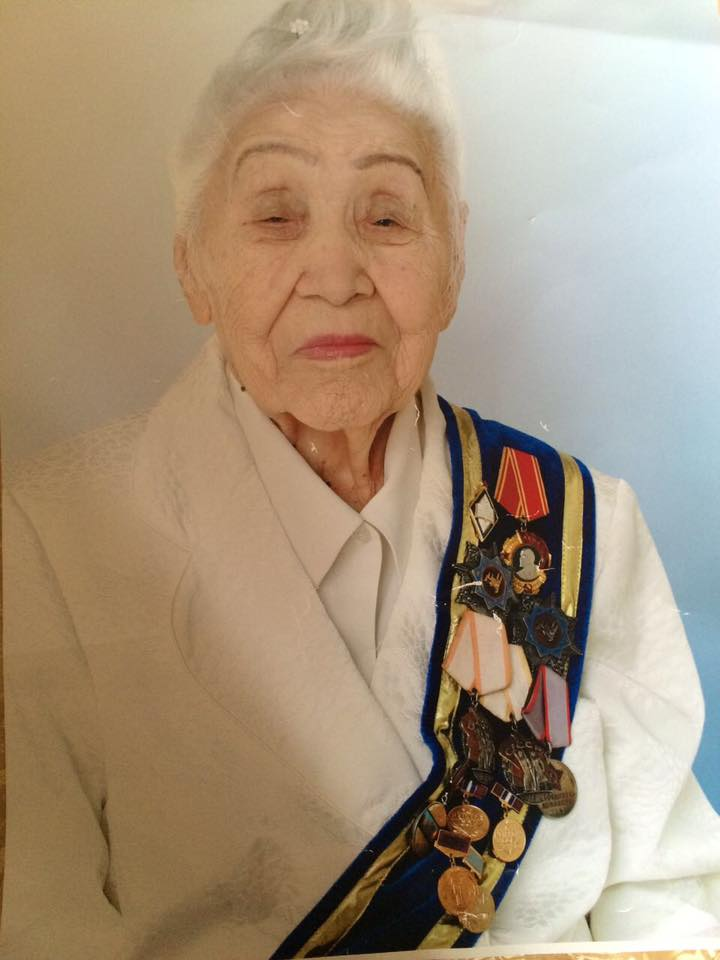
Kakish Ryskulova, vascular surgery pioneer

- Onyekwere Akwari (1942–2019), Nigerian-American surgeon
- Norman Bethune (1890–1939), Canadian thoracic surgeon and humanitarian, early proponent of universal health care and inventor of the first practical mobile blood transport unit.
- Victor Chang (1936–1991), a cardiac surgeon
- Svyatoslav Fyodorov (1927–2000), creator of radial keratotomy
- John Heysham Gibbon (1903–1973), invented the heart-lung machine.
- Henry Gray (1827–1861), author of Gray's Anatomy
- Moshe Gueron (1926–2017), best known for his pioneering research about human heart influences in result of scorpion sting.
- Gavril Ilizarov (1921–1992), Russian orthopedic surgeon who invented the procedure to lengthen or reshape limb bones.
- Walter Lawrence Jr. (1925–2021), surgical oncologist and leader in civil rights health equity efforts
- Lars Leksell (1907–1986), neurosurgery, inventor of radiosurgery
- Joseph Lister (1827–1912), discoverer of surgical asepsis
- Kakish Ryskulova (1918–2018), inventor of new techniques in vascular surgery
- Hilda Villegas Castrejón (1931–2012), Mexican surgeon and pioneer in electron microscopy
- Vivien Thomas (1910–1985), developer with Alfred Blalock (1899–1964) and Helen B. Taussig (1898–1986) of the first congenital heart surgery techniques

== See also ==
- History of surgery
- Surgery
- Women in medicine
