= Theodore H. Schwartz =

American medical scientist (born 1965)

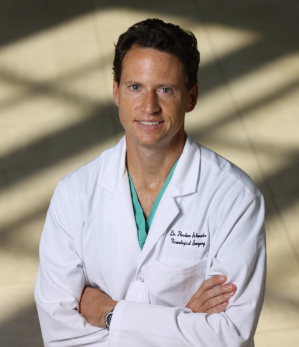
- Born: May 13, 1965 (age 61); New York City, New York, US
- Education: Harvard University, Harvard University Medical School
- Occupation: Neurosurgeon
- Known for: Endoscopic skull base and pituitary surgery, epilepsy surgery, and research
- Dr. Schwartz's voice Treating pediatric epilepsy at the Phyllis and David Komansky Center for Children's Health at NewYork-Presbyterian Weill Cornell Medical Center, 23 September 2013.
- Website: http://weillcornell.org/tschwartz/

Theodore H. Schwartz (born May 13, 1965) is an American medical scientist, academic physician and neurosurgeon.

Schwartz specializes in surgery for brain tumors, pituitary tumors and epilepsy. He is particularly known for developing and expanding the field of minimally-invasive endonasal endoscopic skull base and pituitary surgery and for his research on neurovascular coupling and propagation of epilepsy.

Dr. Schwartz is a Professor of Neurosurgery at the Icahn School of Medicine at Mt. Sinai Hospital in New York City. Previously, Schwartz served as a Professor of Neurosurgery, Otolaryngology & Neuroscience and the Director of Surgical Neuro-Oncology, Epilepsy & Pituitary Surgery at Weill Cornell Medical College, New York Presbyterian Hospital. In 2014, Schwartz received the first endowed professorship in the Department of Neurosurgery at Weill Cornell Medical College being named the David and Ursel Barnes Professor of Minimally Invasive Neurosurgery. He was the Director of the Institute for Minimally Invasive Skull Base and Pituitary Surgery Program and the Director of the Epilepsy Research Laboratory in The Department of Neurosurgery investigating brain mapping, neurovascular coupling and other novel techniques for imaging and treating epilepsy. This epilepsy research laboratory, which is now part of the newly developed Brain and Mind Research Institute at Weill Cornell Medical College, has been funded with K08, R21 and R01 grants by the National Institute of Neurological Disorders and Stroke - a research institute of the National Institutes of Health - and several private organizations. Schwartz has served as a standing member of the NINDS NSD-C Grant Review Committee and also serves on the editorial boards of the Journal of Neurosurgery and World Neurosurgery.

== Biography ==
Theodore Schwartz graduated magna cum laude with dual undergraduate Bachelor of Arts degrees in Philosophy and English from Harvard University in 1987. While in attendance at Harvard, he received the John Harvard Scholarship for Academic Achievement from 1985 to 1987 and was awarded the Hoopes Prize for his senior thesis. Schwartz then went on to graduate magna cum laude from Harvard University Medical School in 1990. After completing his residency and chief residency in neurosurgery at the Neurological Institute of New York at Columbia University Medical Center, Schwartz completed advanced fellowship training at Yale-New Haven Hospital in the surgical treatment of brain tumors and epilepsy. He was awarded the American Association of Neurological Surgeons Van Wagenen Fellowship named after William P. Van Wagenen, a charter member of the Harvey Cushing Society. He was further recognized by the German government when he was awarded the Von Humboldt Fellowship from the Alexander von Humboldt Foundation.

Schwartz has provided commentary to the media on his neurosurgical expertise. This has included the broadcast news organizations of ABC, NBC and CBS. He has also been a guest on the Larry King Live television show. His expertise has also been sought through interviews - quoted and published - in the Wall Street Journal, The New York Post, The New York Daily News, and Crain's New York Business. Schwartz lectures and presents his surgical techniques to other neurosurgeons and ENT surgeons around the world.

== Society memberships ==
Schwartz is a member of several professional societies including: American Medical Association (1993); New York Medical Society (1994); Congress of Neurological Surgery (1995); American Association of Neurological Surgery (1995); American Epilepsy Society (1997); Society for Neuroscience (1997); Society for Neuro-oncology (1998); American College of Surgeons (2003); New York Society for Neurosurgery (2003);The Medical Strollers (2005); Physician's Scientific Society (2005); North American Skull Base Society (2005); The Hospital Graduates (2007); Cornell Alumni Council(2008); Neurosurgical Society of America (2008); Institute for Biomedical Imaging Sciences (2008); International Society for Pituitary Surgeons (2010); American Academy of Neurological Surgery (2010).

== Honors and awards ==
- Junior Investigator Award, American Epilepsy Society(1997)
- Young Clinical Investigators Award, NREF, AANS (2001-2002)
- The Dana Foundation Program in Clinical Imaging Award (2002-2005)
- George Ehni Lectureship, Visiting Professor, Baylor School of Medicine(2008)
- The New York Times New York SuperDoctors (2008-2013)
- New York Magazine Top Doctors, New York Metro Area, Castle Connolly (2008–13)
- U.S. News & World Report (2008-2013)
- America's Top Surgeons (2009-2013)
- Best Doctors in America (2009-2013)
- Pituitary Network Association's Gentle Giant Award(2013)
- Visiting Professorships/Honored Guest Lectureships (National): University of California, Los Angeles, Stanford University, Baylor College of Medicine, Massachusetts General Hospital, University of Rochester, Johns Hopkins School of Medicine, University of Pennsylvania, Barrow Neurological Institute, Thomas Jefferson University, University of Michigan, North Shore-LIJ Health System, Yale University
- Visiting Professorships/Honored Guest Lectureships (International): St Catherine's College; Dr. Balabhai Nanavati Hospital, Mumbai, India; Sheffield Medical School; Mexican Neurosurgical Congress; Neurosurgical Department of Changzheng Hospital, Shanghai, China; Society of British Neurological Surgeons at the Aberdeen Royal Infirmary - based at the Royal College of Surgeons of England; National University Health System, Dept. of Neurosurgery, Singapore; Rhinology Meeting, São Paulo Brazil; International Epilepsy Congress, Montreal, Canada

== Video gallery ==
Program Introduction - Endoscopic Skull Base Surgery at Weill Cornell Medical College

Endoscopic Skull Base Surgery - Osteoma

Endoscopic Skull Base Surgery - Prepontine Cyst

Endoscopic Skull Base Surgery - Intrasellar Craniopharyngioma

== Selected publications ==
To date, Schwartz has co-authored more than 400 research articles, 65 book chapters, as well as co-editing two neurosurgical textbooks on the subject of endoscopic surgery.

=== Books ===
- Anand, Vijay K.; Schwartz, Theodore H., eds. (April 15, 2007). Practical Endoscopic Skull Base Surgery. San Diego, CA: Plural Publishing. ISBN 9781597560603. OCLC 493956633.
- Schwartz, Theodore H.; Anand, Vijay K, eds. (November 23, 2011). Endoscopic Pituitary Surgery: Endocrine, Neuro-Ophthalmologic and Surgical Management. New York; Rolling Meadows, IL: Thieme; American Association of Neurosurgeons. ISBN 9781604063479. OCLC 772646822.
- Zhao, Mingrui; Ma, Hongtao; Theodore H., Schwartz, eds. (May 6, 2014). Neurovascular Coupling Methods. Neuromethods 88/Springer Protocols. New York: Humana Press. ISBN 9781493907236. OCLC 889707494.
- Schwartz, Theodore H. (August 13, 2024). Gray Matters: A Biography of Brain Surgery. New York: Dutton. ISBN 9780593474105. OCLC 1410453073.

=== Book chapters ===
- Nyquist GG, Anand VK, Schwartz TH. Chapter 20 - "Transplanum, Transtuberculum Approach" in Transnasal Endoscopic Skull Base and Brain Surgery: Tips and Pearls. Stamm A. (Editor); Thieme, New York, pp 193–200; Publication Date: August 24, 2011 | ISBN 1604063106 | ISBN 978-1604063103
- Singh A, Anand VK, Schwartz TH. Chapter 47 - "Successful Management of Endoscopic Skull Base Surgery Complications" in Transnasal Endoscopic Skull Base and Brain Surgery: Tips and Pearls. Stamm A. (Editor); Thieme, New York, pp 396–401; Publication Date: August 24, 2011 | ISBN 1604063106 | ISBN 978-1604063103
- Fraser JF, Anand VK, Schwartz TH. Chapter 46 - "Endoscopic Transsphenoidal Approach" in Core Techniques in Operative Neurosurgery. Jandial R. (Author), McCormick P. (Author), Black P. (Author); Elsevier, Philadelphia, PA, pp 328–338; Publication Date: April 25, 2011 | ISBN 1437709079 | ISBN 978-1437709070
- Souweidane MM, Greenfield JP, Schwartz TH. Chapter 29 - "Endoscopic Approach to Intraventricular Brain Tumors" in Schmidek and Sweet: Operative Neurosurgical Techniques: Indications, Methods and Results, 6th edition. Quinones-Hinojosa A. (Editor); Elsevier, Philadelphia, PA, pp 351–356; Publication Date: July 6, 2012 | ISBN 1416068392 | ISBN 978-1416068396
- Moshel YA, Anand VK, Hartl R, Schwartz TH. Chapter 26 - "Extended Endonasal Approaches to the Craniovertebral Junction" in Surgery of the Craniovertebral Junction, 2nd edition. Bambakidis N, Dickman C, Spetzler R, Sonntag V (Editors); Thieme, New York; Publication Date: June 15, 2012 | ISBN 1604063386 | ISBN 978-1604063387

=== Research articles - Epilepsy ===
- Schwartz TH, Bonhoeffer T.; In vivo optical mapping of epileptic foci and surround inhibition in ferret cerebral cortex. Nat Med. (2001) Sep; 7(9): 1063–67. doi:10.1038/nm0901-1063. PMID 11533712
- Suh M., Bahar S., Mehta AD, Schwartz TH; Temporal dependence in uncoupling of blood volume and oxygenation during interictal epileptiform events in rat neocortex. J Neuroscience (2005) Jan 5; 25(1): 68–77. doi:10.1523/JNEUROSCI.2823-04.2005. PMID 15634768
- Suh M., Bahar S., Mehta AD, Schwartz TH; Blood volume and hemoglobin oxygenation response following electrical stimulation of human cortex. Neuroimage (2006) May 15; 31(1): 66–75. doi:10.1016/j.neuroimage.2005.11.030. PMID 16480899
- Zhao M., Suh M., Ma H., Perry C., Geneslaw A., Schwart TH; Focal increases in perfusion and decreases in hemoglobin oxygenation precede seizure onset in spontaneous human epilepsy. Epilepsia (2007) Nov; 48(11): 2059–67. doi:10.1111/j.1528-1167.2007.01229.x. PMID 17666071
- Zhao M., Ma H., Suh M., Schwartz TH; Spatiotemporal dynamics of perfusion and oximetry during ictal discharges in the rat neocortex. J Neuroscience (2009) Mar 4; 29(9): 2814–23. doi:10.1523/JNEUROSCI.4667-08.2009. PMID 19261877
- Ma H., Zhao M., Suh M., Schwartz TH; Hemodynamic surrogates for excitatory membrane potential change during interictal epileptiform events in rat neocortex. J Neurophysiology (2009) May; 101(5): 2550–62. doi:10.1152/jn.90694.2008. PMID 19244357
- Ma H., Geneslaw A., Zhao M., Suh M., Perry C., Schwartz TH; The importance of latency in the focality of perfusion and oxygenation changes associated with triggered afterdischarges in human cortex. J Cereb Blood Flow Metab (2009) May; 29(5): 1003–14. doi:10.1038/jcbfm.2009.26. PMID 19293822
- Geneslaw AS, Zhao M., Ma H., Schwartz TH; Tissue hypoxia correlates with intensity of interictal spikes. J Cereb Blood Flow Metab (2011) June; 31(6): 1394–402. doi:10.1038/jcbfm.2011.16. PMID 21343943
- Zhao M., Nguyen J., Ma H., Nishimura N., Schaeffer CB, Schwartz TH; Preictal and ictal neurovascular and metabolic coupling surrounding a seizure focus. J Neuroscience (2011) Sep 14; 31(37) 13292–300. doi:10.1523/JNEUROSCI.2597-11.2011. PMID 21917812
- Ma H., Zhao M., Schwartz TH; Dynamic neurovascular coupling and uncoupling during ictal onset, propagation, and termination revealed by simultaneous in vivo optical imaging of neural activity and local blood volume. Cereb Cortex (2013) Apr; 23(4) 885–99. doi:10.1093/cercor/bhs079. PMID 22499798

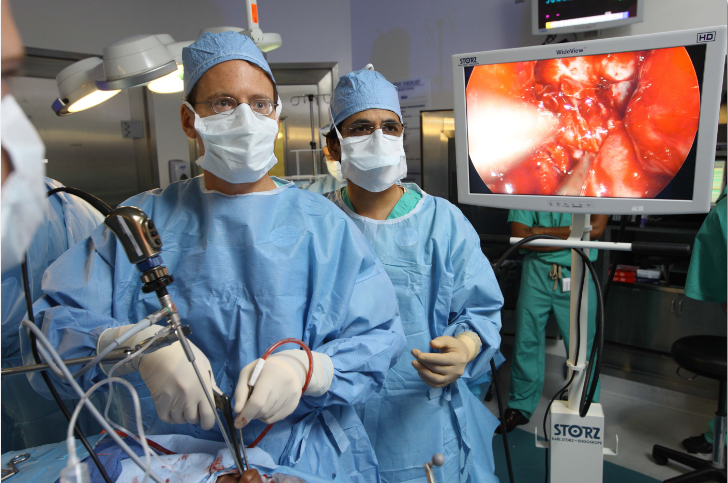
Drs. Schwartz & Anand

=== Research articles - Endoscopic skull base surgery ===
- Laufer I., Anand VK, Schwartz TH; Endoscopic, endonasal extended transsphenoidal, transplanum transtuberculum approach for resection of suprasellar lesions. J Neurosurg (2007) Mar; 106(3): 400–6. doi:10.3171/jns.2007.106.3.400. PMID 17367062
- Leng LZ, Brown S., Anand VK, Schwartz TH; "Gasket-seal" watertight closure in minimal-access endoscopic cranial base surgery. Neurosurgery (2008) May; 62(5 Suppl 2): ONSE 342–3. doi:10.1227/01.neu.0000326017.84315.1f. PMID 18596534
- Schwartz TH, Fraser JF, Brown S., Tabaee A., Kacker A., Anand VK; Endoscopic cranial base surgery: classification of operative approaches. Neurosurgery (2008) May; 62(5): 991–1002. doi:10.1227/01.neu.0000325861.06832.06. PMID 18580797
- Fraser JF, Nyquist GG, Moore N., Anand VK, Schwartz TH; Endoscopic endonasal transclival resection of chordomas: operative technique, clinical outcome, and review of the literature. J Neurosurg (2010) May; 112(5): 1061–9. doi:10.3171/2009.7.JNS081504. PMID 19698043
- Hofstetter CP, Singh A., Anand VK, Kacker A., Schwartz TH; The endoscopic, endonasal, transmaxillary transpterygoid approach to the pterygopalatine fossa, infratemporal fossa, petrous apex, and the Meckel cave. J Neurosurg (2010) Nov; 113(5): 967–74. doi:10.3171/2009.10.JNS09157. PMID 19929194

== See also ==
- List of surgeons
