= St. Philip School of Nursing =

African American school in Richmond, Virginia (1920–1962)

- Seal of St. Philip School of Nursing
- Type: Private
- Active: 1922–1962
- Accreditation: National League for Nursing Education
- Location: Marshall Street, Richmond, Virginia, United States
- Campus: Urban
- Successor: Medical College of Virginia School of Nursing

St. Philip School of Nursing was a training school for African American nurses in Richmond, Virginia. It operated from 1920 to 1962, when it merged into the Medical College of Virginia's School of Nursing, now the VCU School of Nursing.

== History ==
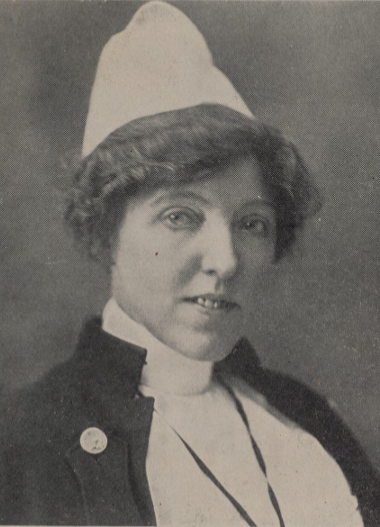
Elizabeth C. Reitz, 2nd Dean of St. Philips School of Nursing

St. Philip School of Nursing was established to provide nurses for the newly established St. Philip Hospital which served the African American community of Richmond, Virginia. At the time, Virginia's constitution prohibited Blacks and Whites from attending the same school. St. Philips School opened in November 1920. Its purpose was “to enable Negro women with proper educational qualifications to prepare themselves for a profession for which they have shown themselves to be adapted, and to enable them to become actively engaged in healing and preventing disease among their own race."

Josephine Kimerer, director of the Medical College of Virginia School of Nursing, was also the director of St. Philip School for its first two years. She was replaced by Elizabeth C. Reitz, who was also the director of both nursing schools. This dual oversight was supposed to ensure that the Black nursing school was equal to its counterpart for Whites. However, students at St. Philip School faced different societal obstacles such as racism from doctors and had inadequate equipment and overcrowded housing. St. Philip School's faculty was all white. It hired its first four Black instructors in 1941.

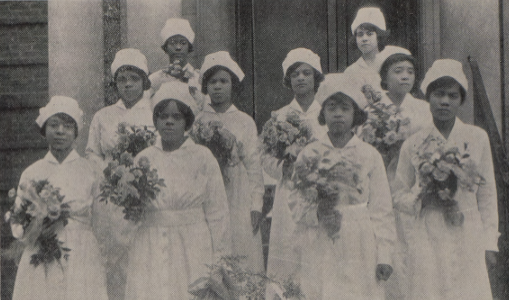
St. Philip School of Nursing, class of 1924

Three students completed their training in 1923—Bessie Conway, Adelaide Royster Thomas and Helena Bell Wooldridge. The school's first commencement ceremony took place in June 1924 at the First African Baptist Church. Dr. Midian O. Bousfield of Chicago, a former president of the National Medical Association, was the keynote speaker. One of the school's traditions included a candlelight capping ceremony, marking the completion of the preclinical portion of the curriculum.

In the fall of 1927, the school had 41 students, the maximum number it could accommodate. In December 1940, the school received a $168,000 grant from the General Education Board of New York City. The school used $130,000 to add and furnish 74 rooms for student housing and to enlarge its library. The grant also provided $30,000 to improve the clinical teaching program and add instruction in English.

By the 1960s, enrollment at the school started to decline because of integration; Medical College of Virginia School of Nursing began admitting Black students in 1957. The St. Philip School of Nursing graduated its last class in 1962. It was merged into the Medical College of Virginia School of Nursing, now the VCU School of Nursing.

Between 1920 and 1962, St. Philip School of Nursing graduated 791 students. In 2012, Virginia Commonwealth University hosted some 200 people for the 50th anniversary of St. Philip School of Nursing.

== Campus ==
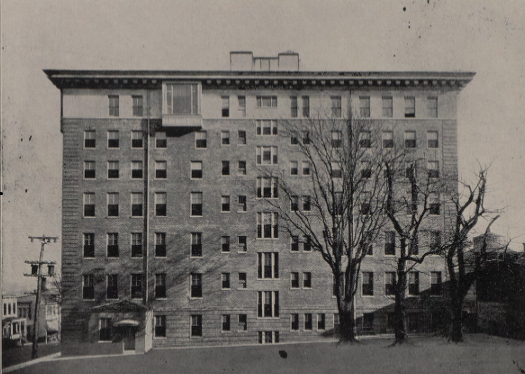
St. Philip Hospital, circa 1927

When St. Philip School of Nursing opened, classes were held in St. Philip Hospital. The school moved to the newly constructed St. Philip Hall on 12th and Marshall Street in Richmond in September 1931. The five story St. Philip Hall included classrooms, a laboratory, recreational space, a library, and an auditorium, with dormitories for 94 students above. The building and its equipment cost $160,000 ($3,387,309 in 2023 money), paid for by a $80,000 grant from the General Education Board, $40,000 from the Rosenwald Fund, and $40,000 from the Medical College of Virginia. This building was expanded in the early 1940s to included an additional 74 dormitory rooms.

The former campus is now part of Virginia Commonwealth University. All of the buildings of the former campus and the St. Philip Hospital have been demolished.

== Academics ==
St. Philip School of Nursing offered a three-year diploma program and a B.S. in nursing. In addition to classes, students worked at St. Philip Hospital for 58 hours a week; this was later reduced to a 40-hour week that included class and clinical experience. The school was accredited by the National League for Nursing Education.

The school started a B.S. and postgraduate program in public health program on March 16, 1936, becoming the first school in the United States to offer this program to Blacks. The public health program was supported by the federal government and opened with 27 students from twelve states and Washington, D.C. The public health program was accredited by the National Organization for Public Health Nursing in October 1937.

The school had a chapter of Chi Eta Phi professional nursing sorority, founded in 1957.

== Legacy ==
The St. Philip School of Nursing Alumnae Association created the St. Philip School of Nursing Alumnae Scholarship for African American students at the Virginia Commonwealth University's School of Nursing in 1992.

== Notable people ==
=== Alumnae ===
- Edith DeVoe – second black woman admitted to serve in the United States Navy Nurse Corps during World War II

=== Faculty ===
- Mary Elizabeth Carnegie – professor and dean of the nursing school at Florida A&M University, president of the American Academy of Nursing, and editor of Nursing Research
