= Onyekwere Akwari =

Nigerian-American surgeon

Onyekwere E. Akwari, M.D., F.A.C.S., F.R.C.S. (C.) (June 5, 1942 – April 14, 2019) was Nigerian-American, and was Duke University's first African-American surgeon. His academic career involved laboratory research, complex general surgery, teaching and advocacy from the undergraduate through postdoctoral levels, and contributions to Duke University and American surgery.

== Early years, education and training ==
Onyekwere Emmanuel Akwari was born on June 5, 1942, in Aba (at that time in the Imo State, now the Abia State, of southeastern colonial Nigeria) to Ngarasi Christiana Ukegbu, a shopkeeper and landlord, and Theophilus Egesi Akwari, owner of an export-import firm. Akwari was the eldest of eight siblings.

Akwari's primary education was in Government School, Aba until age 12 when he became a boarding student at Hope Waddell Training Institution. He became senior prefect and valedictorian, graduated, and earned his higher school certificate in a colonial educational system conforming to British education. (Nigeria gained independence from England in 1960, the “Year of Independence” for some 17 African countries.) Akwari received a scholarship to the University of Washington for his undergraduate education from the competitive African Scholarship Program for American Universities (ASPAU), a collaboration between the African countries, a cohort of US universities, and the predecessor of the US Agency for International Development.

In 1966, Akwari began medical school at the University of Southern California. Akwari served as president of his first-year class and, in his fourth year, president of the medical student body receiving an award for outstanding contributions to the school.

In 1967, the Igbo sought independence from Nigeria. A civil war ensued, cutting Akwari's contact with family until 1970 and decimating the family businesses. Akwari began his general surgery residency at the Mayo Clinic in Rochester, Minnesota in 1970.

Akwari was a Mayo Foundation Scholar and a Stanley Johnson Scholar performing gastrointestinal research in the laboratories of Drs. Keith Kelly, Charles F. Code, and Sidney F. Phillips. From January to June 1977, in a six-month interregnum from the Mayo Clinic, he co-created the training program in Emergency Medicine at King-Drew Medical Center in Los Angeles.

== Academic career ==
Akwari was recruited to Duke University as associate professor of surgery in 1978 by Dr. David C. Sabiston Jr. Akwari was Duke's first African-American surgeon and second black tenure-track hire, at the time, in the Duke University School of Medicine. He published over 150 papers and book chapters and presented at over 70 national meetings. In addition to clinical practice and academic research and writing, he served the Medical Center, the university, national and international surgery on numerous committees, and served American and international surgery by serving on committees and boards of major surgical societies. His career was abbreviated by a stroke in 1995.

Among his society memberships were the Society for Surgery of the Alimentary Tract, the National Medical Association, the American Motility society, and the Association of Veterans Administration Surgeons. He was a Fellow of the American College of Surgeons, the Royal College of Surgeons and the American Surgical Association. He was a founding member of the Trauma Association of Canada and the World Association of Hepato-Pancreato-Biliary Surgery. He headed the surgical section of the National Medical Association. In 1989, Akwari organized the first meeting of the Society of Black Academic Surgeons. He served as its second president.

Akwari received the Golden Apple Award voted by the Duke medical student body, and the University Scholar/Teacher of the Year Award. With other pioneering African-American faculty in the medical school, Akwari championed fair treatment of minority medical students and increased hiring of minority faculty.

Two endowments in Akwari's honor include a distinguished professorship awarding early-career faculty five years of support for their academic promise and an Akwari Society honoring humanism in Surgery, both at Duke University School of Medicine. The Society for Black Academic Surgeons presents the Onye Emmanuel Akwari, MD Award to a medical student for excellence presenting at its annual meeting.

His personal and academic papers are housed at the Duke University Medical Center Archives.
