= Sadie Heath Cabaniss =

American nurse (1865–1921)

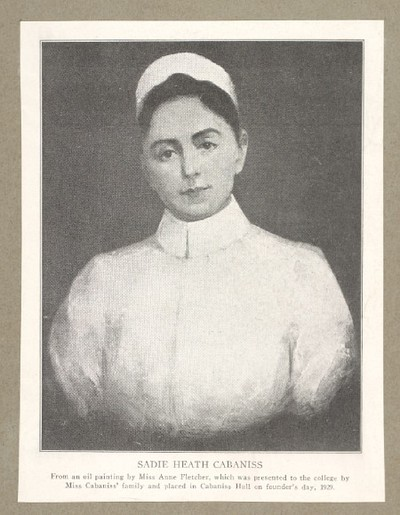
- Born: October 8, 1865; Petersburg, Virginia
- Died: July 11, 1921 (aged 55); Richmond, Virginia
- Education: St. Timothy's School, Catonsville, Maryland, Graduated 1874 Johns Hopkins School of Nursing, Baltimore, Maryland, Graduated 1893

Sadie Heath Cabaniss (October 9, 1865 – July 11, 1921) was a pioneer for nursing in Virginia and developed the first training school for nurses that followed the Nightingale plan. Her training school lives on to this day and is now the School of Nursing at Virginia Commonwealth University. In addition, Cabaniss was the founder of the Charter Member and First President of the Virginia State Association of Nurses (now the Virginia Nurses Association). Finally, she was the President and original member of the Virginia State Board of Examiners of Nurse Founder of the Nurses Settlement, forerunner of the Instructive Visiting Nurses Association. Sadie Health Cabaniss was inducted into the American Nurses Association Hall of Fame on July 1, 2002, at the ANA Convention in Philadelphia, Pennsylvania.

== Early life and education ==
Sadie Heath Cabaniss was born in Petersburg, Virginia, on October 9, 1865, to parents Charles and Virginia Cabaniss. She graduated from St. Timothy's School (an all-girls high school in Catonsville, Maryland) in 1874. After her high school graduation, she served as a governess and a teacher before attending college. Cabaniss attended Johns Hopkins University School of Nursing in Baltimore, Maryland.

== Career ==
Throughout her career, Sadie Heath Cabaniss was heavily devoted to the cause of public health and laid the foundation for professional nursing in Virginia. In 1893, Cabaniss first started working as a night supervisor at the Johns Hopkins Hospital. Two years later she became the supervisor of the operating room at the Old Dominion Hospital in Richmond, Virginia, which was connected to the Medical College of Virginia (MCV). While there, the faculty asked her to develop a training school for nurses. Cabaniss accepted the offer and ran the school on the Nightingale method of nursing education from 1895 until April 1901. The Nightingale method involves training in a civil hospital by way of an apprenticeship. The school exists to this day and is now known as the School of Nursing at Virginia Commonwealth University. In 1900, she and several students from the Old Dominion nursing school organized the Nurses Settlement of Richmond in response to the sick. This organization provided home services for the ill. This established the first rural visiting nursing service in Virginia in Hanover County. Cabaniss also developed Virginia Nurses Association in 1901. This organization was made up of alumni from existing training schools in Virginia. As president of the organization, she assisted in drafting a measure that ultimately regulated the practice of nursing in the Commonwealth. Her continued devotion to public health led Cabaniss to develop a nurses' settlement in St. Augustine, Florida, as well.

== Legacy ==
In 1921, after the death of Sadie Heath Cabaniss, the Graduate Nurses Association of Virginia started to raise $50,000 to honor Cabaniss. And in 1928, the Cabaniss Memorial School of Nursing Education opened at the University of Virginia. The main goal of the Cabaniss Memorial School of Nursing Education was to further prepare well-qualified nurses as supervisors, administrators and teachers. From 1928 to 1967, Virginia Commonwealth University's Medical campus named one of the building "Cabaniss Hall". The "Cabaniss Hall" was first served as the Nursing Education Building and then became the dormitory for nursing students. The Nursing Division of the Medical College of Virginia Alumni Association of the Virginia Commonwealth University (MAVAA of VCU) and the Virginia Commonwealth University School of Nursing's Cabaniss Leadership Challenge was established in July 2010 to honor the founding director of the School of Nursing, Sadie Heath Cabaniss. The main goal of this challenge was to raise $4 million for scholarships, professorships, and the chair position if the dean of the School of Nursing.
