= Beckstrand Cancer Foundation =

American nonprofit organization

Beckstrand Cancer Foundation is a 501(c)(3) organization that was founded in 1974 by Dr. Grant Beckstrand and a group of doctors specializing in the treatment and care of cancer patients. It was formed by incorporation as a non-profit organization.

== Foundation ==
The Foundation has four core programs open to the cancer community:

- The Individual Patient Assistance (IPA) Program
- Psychosocial Pediatric Program
- Art Therapy Program
- BELIEVE Holiday Program

The Individual Patient Assistance (IPA) has become the cornerstone of the Foundation's outreach to the public. This program targets newly diagnosed cancer patients in Los Angeles County and Orange County who are currently undergoing aggressive cancer treatment such as chemotherapy or radiation, and are experiencing financial hardship as a direct result of their cancer diagnosis. To be considered for this program, patients fill out an application, provide requested documentation, and speak to a licensed social worker. In addition to financial assistance and patient advocacy, many applicants receive supportive counseling and practical help that enables them to cope with critical survival needs.

Beckstrand Cancer Foundation has formed three auxiliary groups. The first group, Four Pearls, is an assemblage of young professionals who work to raise awareness and funds on behalf of the Foundation. It was initiated by Lauren Collins, Veronica Muth and Stephanie Muth. The second group, Junior Pearls, is composed of high school aged members who also support the mission of the parent Foundation. It was initiated by Alexandra Spitzer. The third group, Mini Pearls, is for grade school aged children who want to help pediatric cancer patients. It was initiated by Jillian Ray.

Each of the auxiliaries is branded with a variation of the butterfly seen in the Beckstrand Cancer Foundation logo. In 2008, the Foundation re-branded its logo to incorporate its now signature butterfly, citing the symbolism of the butterfly with respect to change and rebirth. The new design consisted of two sides of individual butterflies coming together to form one, complete butterfly. The Foundation has used the concept of the butterfly effect to encourage its volunteers and supporters to make small changes that can collectively inspire widespread change.

In 2009, the Foundation marked its 35-year milestone. In recognition of the milestone, Newport Beach Mayor Ed Selich issued a proclamation naming May 3 "Dr. Grant Beckstrand Day". The Foundation's supporters chose to highlight the date by participating as "Team Beckstrand" in the Orange County Marathon and fundraising on behalf of area patients.

== Programs ==
Individual Patient Assistance Program

One of the providers of the Individual Patient Assistance Program is Purdue. Purdue helps low income patients by giving them access to their prescription medications at little to no cost.

Psychosocial Pediatric Program

The Psychosocial Pediatric Program applies multiple disciplines of behavioral and social sciences to help maintain homeostasis in the quality of life. This involves not only the patient, but the patient's family.

Art therapy

Art therapy is a specialized psychotherapy that encourages patients to use self-expression to better understand their emotions during life changing or traumatic experiences in their life. By using self-expression, the patients confidence is boosted, giving them more control over their emotions and other difficulties. In Art Therapy, there are many mediums that are utilized from painting in acrylic or watercolor paints, sculpting with found objects or clay, and drawing with graphite. However, with our constantly growing knowledge in technology and pop-culture, Art Therapists also will allow patients to use dance, film, writing, and many other types of medium to express themselves.

BELIEVE Holiday Program

The BELIEVE Holiday Program provides given amenities of Christmas to families dealing with Cancer.

== Financial Efficiency ==
Beckstrand Cancer Foundation is a 501(c)(3) nonprofit organization that gained its tax exempt status in 1974. The Foundation is compliant with not-for-profit accounting and reporting principles generally accepted by the United States of America. In its most recent 990, it was revealed that eighty percent of every dollar goes directly to patient programs, and operating and fundraising expenses are kept to within twenty percent.

== Direct Assistance ==
The Foundation's IPA program helps qualified patients with day-to-day basic needs. Financial assistance may be directed to rent or mortgage payments, utilities, food, gas and transportation, medical insurance premiums, prescriptions or limited treatment. The programs is used as a means for optimizing all available social service avenues. As an example, the Foundation may determine the need to subsidize medical copayments or high insurance bills for a patient, and then additionally help with applications to Medical, SSI and other programs to ensure a limited duration of need. By leveraging its allocations, the IPA program meets urgent needs with almost immediate responsiveness and assures the highest impact for every philanthropic dollar.

== Ad campaigns ==
In 2009, Beckstrand Cancer Foundation partnered with Chef Jack Witherspoon to raise awareness for its Psychosocial Pediatric Program. Witherspoon is a nine-year-old pediatric cancer survivor who battled Acute Lymphocytic Leukemia (ALL) twice, and developed a passion for cooking when he began frequently watching The Food Network during his treatment time at the hospital. Witherspoon used his cooking skills to raise funds for leukemia research and partnered with the Foundation to draw attention to the direct assistance needs of the same patient population. Witherspoon has been interviewed by Los Angeles Times, CNN, Channel 2 News, and cooked as a guest on The Tonight Show with Jay Leno and The Bonnie Hunt Show. He is now in remission.
