= Nursing Research =

Academic journal

- Discipline: Nursing
- Language: English
- Edited by: Rita Pickler

Publication details
- History: 1952–present
- Publisher: Wolters Kluwer

Standard abbreviations
- ISO 4: Nurs. Res.

Indexing
- CODEN: NURVAP
- ISSN: 0029-6562 (print); 1538-9847 (web)
- LCCN: 56038667
- OCLC no.: 01760937

Links
- Journal homepage

Nursing Research is a peer-reviewed nursing journal covering a wide range of topics including health promotion, human responses to illness, acute care nursing research, symptom management, cost-effectiveness, vulnerable populations, health services, and community-based nursing studies. It is published by Wolters Kluwer and was established in 1952, with Helen L Bunge as its founding editor-in-chief. Its current editor-in-chief is Rita Pickler (Ohio State University).

== Abstracting and indexing ==
The journal is abstracted and indexed in CINAHL and MEDLINE/PubMed. According to the Journal Citation Reports, the journal has a 2017 impact factor of 1.725.
