= VCU Medical Center =

- Virginia Commonwealth University

Geography
- Location: 1250 E. Marshall Street Richmond,VA 23219, United States
- Coordinates: 37°32′25″N 77°25′48″W

Organization
- Care system: Public
- Type: Teaching
- Affiliated university: VCU School of Medicine
- Network: VCU Health

Services
- Emergency department: Level I Adult Trauma Center / Level I Pediatric Trauma Center
- Beds: 820

Helipads
- Helipad: FAA LID: VA10; FAA LID: VA45
Number	Length		Surface
Number	ft	m	Surface
H1	53 × 53	16 × 16	mats
H2	53 × 53	16 × 16	mats

History
- Founded: 1838

Links
- Website: vcuhealth.org
- Lists: Hospitals in the United States

The VCU Medical Center (VCU Health), formerly known as the Medical College of Virginia (MCV), is the public medical campus of Virginia Commonwealth University (VCU), located in downtown Richmond, Virginia, United States. As MCV, VCU Medical Center merged with the Richmond Professional Institute in 1968 to create VCU. In the 1990s, the Medical College of Virginia Hospitals Authority was created to oversee MCV Hospitals. In 2004, the name of this authority was changed to the VCU Health System, and the MCV Hospitals and surrounding campus were named the VCU Medical Center. The public authority oversees the employees and real estate occupied by the five schools within the VCU Medical Center. It was at this time that the MCV Campus moniker was created.

West Hospital houses various clinical, administrative, and support services of the hospitals of the VCU Medical Center; clinical, academic, and administrative units of the School of Medicine; and academic and administrative units of the College of Health Professions. In addition to the adult hospital, Children's Hospital of Richmond at VCU is located on the campus. Today the VCU Medical Center is composed of the hospitals and five schools—College of Health Professions, School of Dentistry, School of Medicine, School of Nursing, School of Pharmacy—and is located on the MCV Campus, adjacent to the Virginia BioTechnology Research Park.

== The VCU Medical Center ==
VCU Medical Center has 820 beds and sees roughly 83,300 emergency room visits, 33,900 inpatient discharges, 5,400 trauma admissions and 3,250 newborn deliveries annually.

=== Expansion ===
==== New construction ====
New Children's Hospital – The new children's tower, previously referred to as the "Wonder Tower" opened on April 30, 2023. The new facility will house 72 private rooms; an emergency department; expanded child life services; family amenities; additional operating rooms and imaging capabilities.

==== Recently constructed ====
- Massey Cancer Center – An 80,000-square-foot (7,400 m^{2}), $41.8 million building, with 72 research labs and a two-level, 109-car parking lot
- Critical Care Hospital – Central Virginia's only level-one trauma center, the 15-story Critical Care Hospital specializes in intensive care
- Medical Sciences Building II – a 125,000 square feet (11,600 m^{2}) research lab
- W. Baxter Perkinson Jr Building – School of Dentistry. A 54,000 square feet (5,000 m^{2}) addition to the School of Dentistry on Leigh Street that houses research, clinic and teaching space
- New School of Nursing – an additional 70,000 square feet (6,500 m^{2}) of research and training space for the VCU nursing program
- MCV Campus Recreation Center – a 31,000 square feet (2,900 m^{2}) addition to the Recreation and Aquatic Center
- Larrick Student Center – renovated MCV campus dining court
- Virginia Treatment Center for Children - a pediatric inpatient & outpatient psychiatry and behavioral health facility

== History ==
=== Founding ===
On December 1, 1837, the president and trustees of Hampden–Sydney College created a medical department to be located at Richmond.

Founders of the college

- Richard Lafon Bohannan – Professor of Obstetrics and Diseases of Women and Children
- Lewis Webb Chamberlayne – Professor of Materia Medica and Therapeutics
- John Cullen – Professor of Theory and Practice of Medicine
- Augustus Lockman Warner – Dean and Professor of Surgery and Surgical Anatomy
- Socrates Maupin – Professor of Chemistry and Pharmacy
- Thomas Johnson – Professor of Anatomy and Physiology

=== First year ===
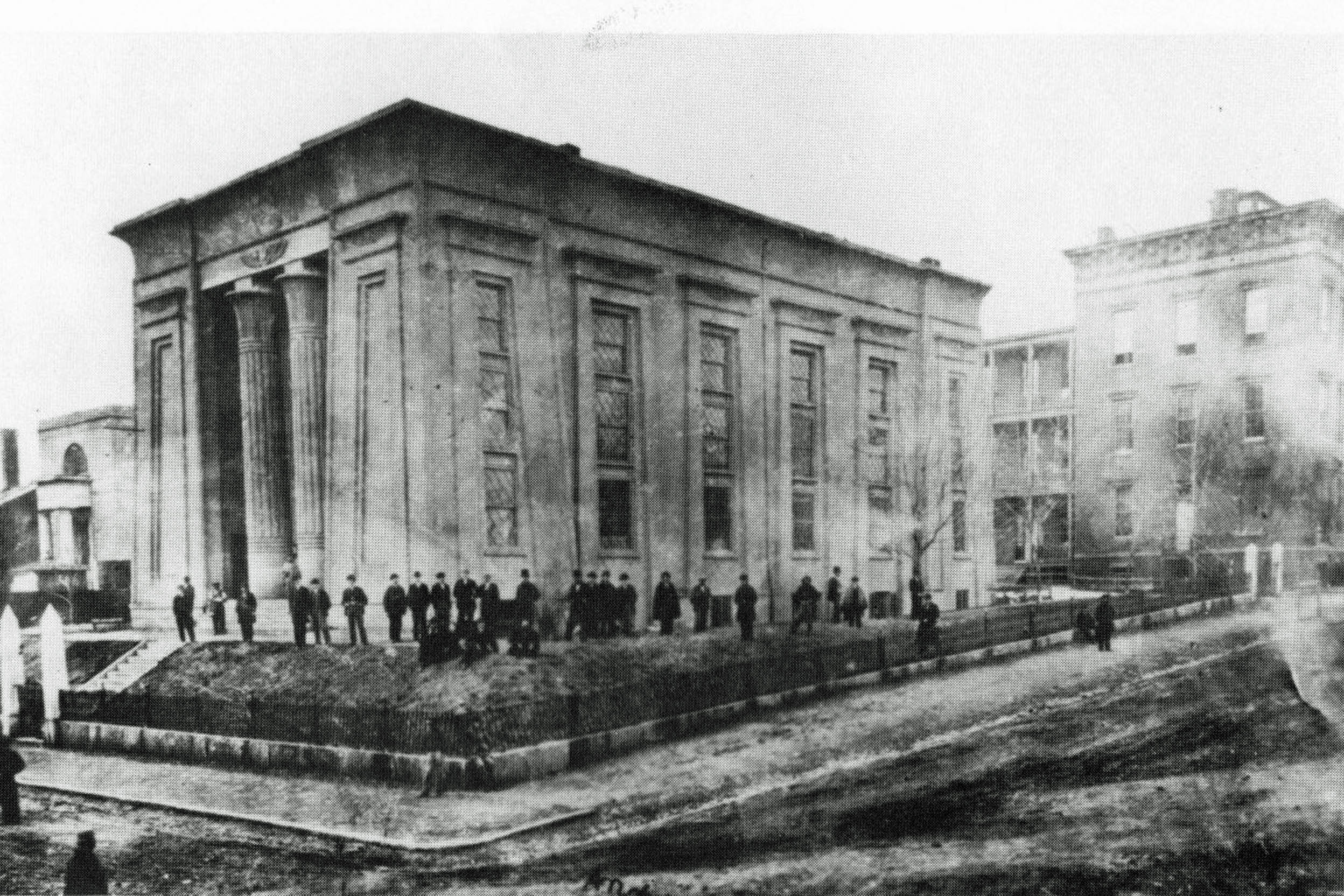
Finished in 1845, the first MCV building was built in the Egyptian-revival style

MCV opened on November 5, 1838, in the old Union Hotel located at the corner of Nineteenth and Main streets.

The college began as the Medical Department of Hampden-Sydney College. There were forty-six students enrolled in the first class, which lasted from November 5, 1838 – April 4, 1839. Students paid $20 to the professors for each of the six courses.

=== 1850–1861 ===
The Medical Department of Hampden-Sydney College received an independent charter from the General Assembly in 1854, and became the Medical College of Virginia (MCV) Shortly thereafter, in 1860, it transferred all its property to the Commonwealth and became a state institution. There had not been a separate hospital where patients could be housed within the college buildings since the beginning. A new hospital, known as the College Infirmary, was built at a cost of $22,336.57 and opened in April, 1861.

=== Civil War ===
Soon the Civil War erupted, and the college found itself playing an important role in the education of Confederate surgeons and in the hospital care of sick and wounded military personnel. During the war, the school remained open, and it graduated a class every year throughout the conflict. The MCV is the only Southern medical school still in existence to have done so.

=== 1866–1882 ===
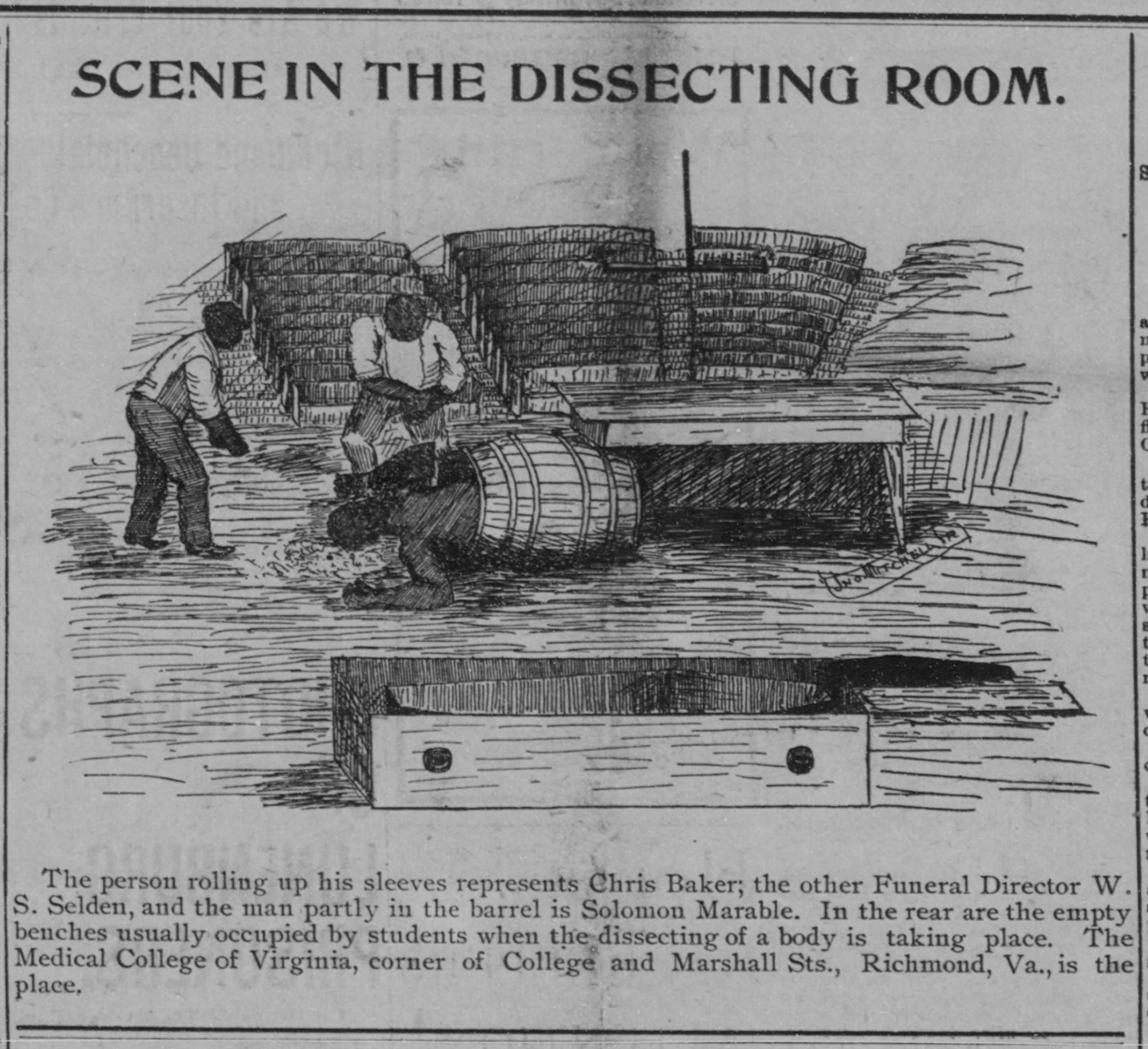
Solomon Marable's body was found packed into a barrel of salt for preservation in the dissection room.

For several years after the Civil War, the faculty included James Brown McCaw, a member of a family long prominent in the medical field, who had commanded a Confederate hospital. McCaw served as a professor, dean of the faculty, and president of the board of visitors. The youngest of McCaw's nine children, Walter McCaw, was gifted academically and completed his medical degree at the Virginia College of Medicine in 1882, when he was only nineteen.

In 1867, the college's first outpatient clinic was established, when the faculty agreed to cooperate with the Freedmen's Bureau and the City of Richmond in the establishment of a "dispensary for the relief of the sick poor, both white and colored."

In the late 1800s, African-American janitor Chris Baker became notorious for obtaining cadavers for dissection by students. One case in 1898 was subject to an exposé by Richmond Planet publisher John Mitchell Jr. and included grisly sketches of the proceedings. Baker's success, however, led to one professor saying in 1898 that the school could be called "Chris Baker's College".

=== The University College of Medicine ===
A second medical school, the "College of Physicians and Surgeons" (later the "University College of Medicine"), was founded by Hunter McGuire in 1893, just two blocks from the Egyptian Building. The new college was composed of three schools: medicine, dentistry, and pharmacy. The University College of Medicine was destined to have a lifespan of only twenty years as an independent institution. The Flexner Report of 1909 suggested that the two schools would be better off merging, which they then did in 1913, retaining the Medical College of Virginia name.

=== 1913 Rankings with Christopher Tompkins ===
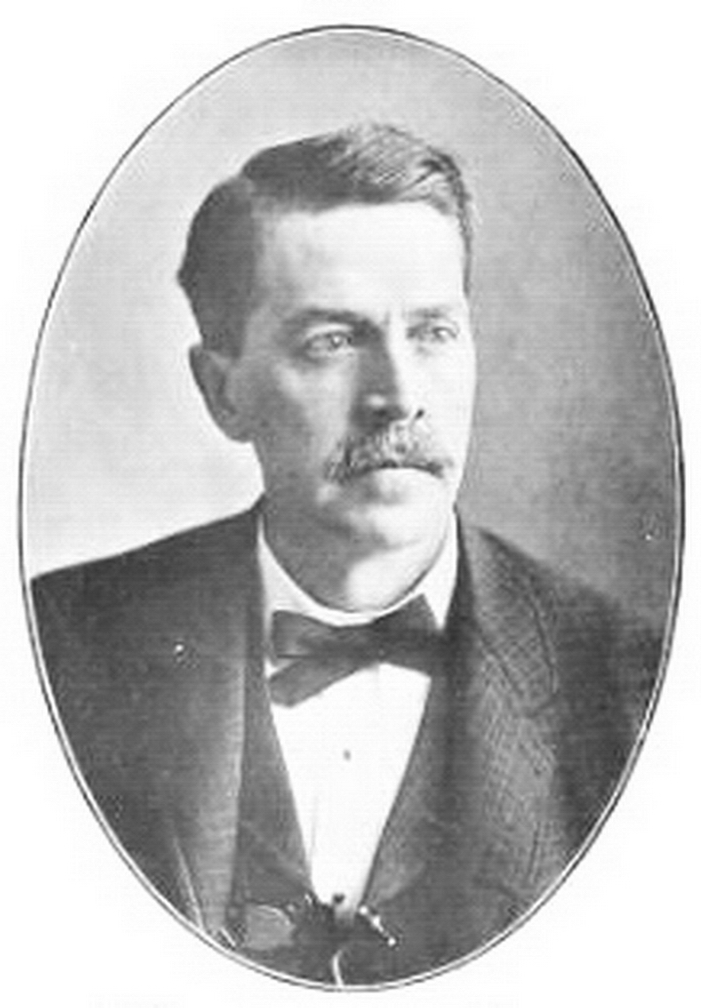
Hunter McGuire

Dean Tompkins said in his retirement speech in 1913, "From a school whose matriculants numbered, as I can remember it, 22 during the session and whose standing amongst medical colleges in the country was so insignificant that it was not worth noticing, the matriculants have increased to—in one session—as many as 306. In a recent table compiled in December 1911, from the reports of the Council on Medical Education of the American Medical Association, it was found that of all the medical colleges in the United States and taking them in the order in which their graduates passed the various medical examining boards, the Medical College of Virginia stood fourth; the order in which they came being, (1) Rush, (2) Johns Hopkins, (3) Cornell, (4) Medical College of Virginia, and about one hundred and forty behind them."

=== Aborted consolidation with the University of Virginia ===
In 1920, a discussion that had gone on for years without resolution of the issues involved was revived. Repeatedly, the view had been expressed that the Medical College of Virginia and the University of Virginia Department of Medicine might well be consolidated with benefit both to the schools and to the public. In 1867, 1905, and 1913, the question had been raised; and, finally, in 1920 a serious study was undertaken. In reviewing appropriations, Governor Westmoreland Davis noted that Virginia was supporting two medical schools, seemingly in competition, and surmised that this might well be uneconomic, particularly at a time when money was tight.

Acting on the Governor's recommendation, the General Assembly authorized a Commission on Medical Education. The commission made a thorough study that recommended that Virginia support only one medical school; that this school be in Richmond; that it be the Department of Medicine of the University of Virginia under the full and sole control of the Rector and Visitors of the university; and that the plan be effective upon the unconditional transfer of all Medical College of Virginia properties and assets to the Rector and Visitors of the university. The Board of Visitors of the Medical College of Virginia was in favor, and by resolution determined that the college would willingly embrace the plan should the commission's recommendations be accepted by the legislature.

Instead, the alumni of the university, under the leadership of Hugh H. Young, of Johns Hopkins Medical School, waged a campaign to preserve the medical school at Charlottesville. The report was approved overwhelmingly in the House but died by a 24-16 tally in the Senate. In view of the state's growth, the action of the Senate was fortunate. Had the report won approval, Virginia would have found herself today facing the need to establish another medical school, with a minimum price tag of 30 million dollars. The issue of consolidation was to rise again, in 1947, but only briefly, as the handwriting on the wall was by that time quite clear.

=== The Great Depression and expansion ===
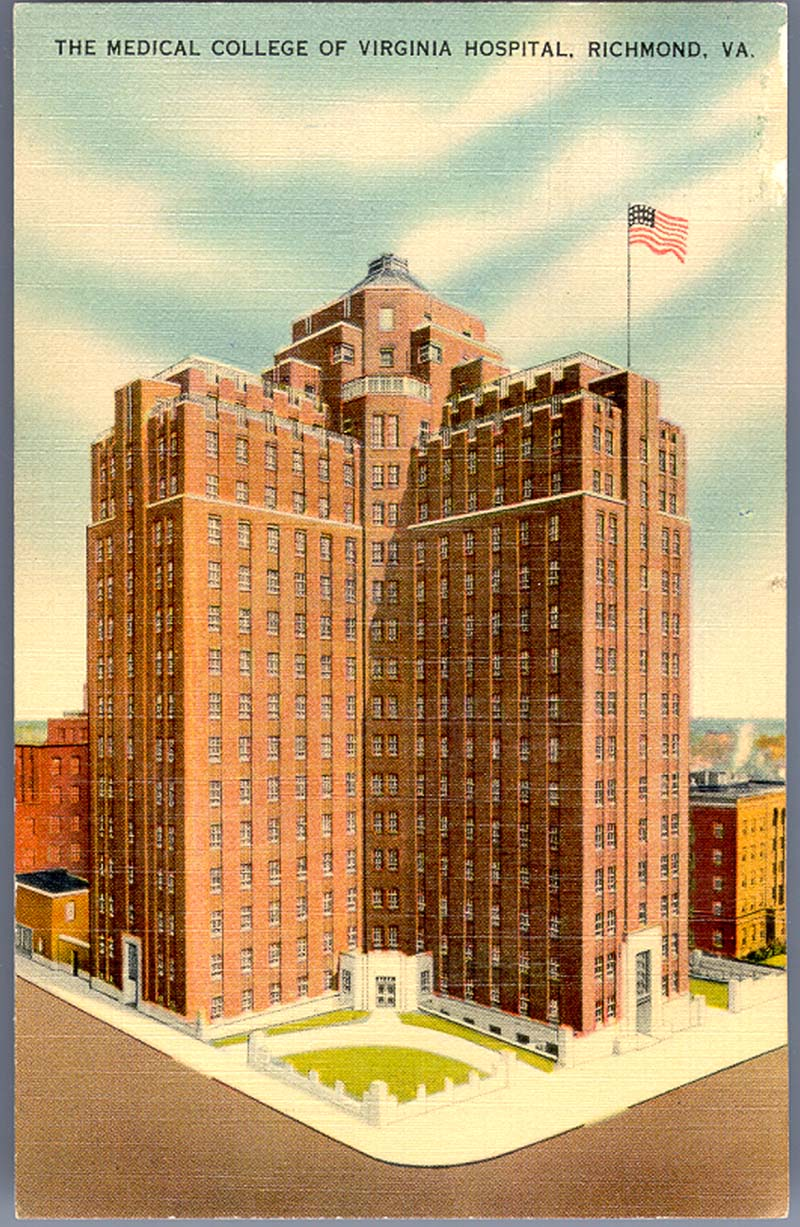
The West Hospital in Richmond, Virginia, circa 1942

The Great Depression struck the college with perhaps more force than in the case of some other institutions. MCV was struggling to secure funds without which specialized structures and trained personnel, both expensive, could not be had. Plans laid prior to 1930 with early fruition apparently possible had to be put aside, notably the projected laboratory and outpatient building. Salaries, never high, had to be cut.

However, by 1941 the modern 600-bed, 18-story MCV Hospital was completed; the Egyptian Building had been completely reconstructed to provide up-to-date facilities for the departments of bacteriology and pathology and to create the 300-seat Simon Baruch Auditorium, in the Egyptian motif, named for Simon Baruch, class of 1862, whose distinguished son, Bernard M. Baruch, helped make the restoration possible. Also by 1941, new quarters were provided for the departments of physiology and pharmacology by adding a fourth story to McGuire Hall. In the brief span of five years, a remarkable program of physical expansion had been completed.

In 1945, a certificate in physical therapy program was created by Frances A. Hellebrandt

=== 1956–1963 ===
The interest of individuals, organizations, and agencies, other than those of the Commonwealth, may be gauged by their provision, since 1956, of gifts, grants, and contracts for teaching, research, and capital improvements totaling a little over $15 million. Reflecting the influence of such support, the college is accredited with university status. as the faculty and staff go about their mission of providing for the education of some 1200 students enrolled in 10 schools—plus some 200 young physicians in residence for further training—of caring for the sick who occupy its 1308 beds. In 1962, the college absorbed the black students from the St. Philip School of Nursing during the implementation of integration. The $6.5 million Medical Education Building was completed in the summer of 1963. It was a significant implementation to the physical plant of the college since the completion of the Medical College of Virginia Hospital in 1940. With the added facilities of this building, the school of medicine was able to increase enrollment from 84 to 128 students.

=== Becoming VCU ===
In 1968, the state legislature merged the Medical College of Virginia with the Richmond Professional Institute to form Virginia Commonwealth University. During this merger, the agreement stipulated that the MCV would retain its name in perpetuity. The exact title by the act was "The Medical College of Virginia Health Sciences Division of Virginia Commonwealth University."

=== Envisioning a great urban university ===
At the 1969 convocation for VCU, Brandt envisioned a great urban university, stating, "we are caught up in a thing you might call the Virginia Commonwealth University Idea. It's an exciting concept....an academic approach without precedent, VCU will become a name that will mean a great deal to you in years to come...as one of the leading educational institutions."

In 1983, the VCU Massey Cancer Center opens.

=== 1994 Kontos Building construction and the discovery of the East Marshall Street Well ===
During the construction of the Kontos building, a well was accidentally uncovered which was found to be full of human remains. The capping of the well dates to about 1860. The discarded remains belong to various individuals, mostly enslaved and free people of color, whose graves were robbed in order to supply the medical college with cadavers for medical study and training. The medical college's primary source for obtaining cadavers from the time of its establishment until 1879 was the Shockoe Hill African Burying Ground. After its closure in June of that year, African American pauper burials were conducted at Oakwood Cemetery. Oakwood then became the new primary target of the grave robbers.

From its beginning, the Medical College of Richmond, Virginia, boasted of its unique ability to acquire medical cadavers in abundance. It was routinely stated in their advertisements. As such was the case in the May 11, 1838 edition of the Richmond Enquirer, which stated: "In no city in our Union are anatomical materials so abundant and easily procured as Richmond..." What was not stated was that the anatomical material was acquired through participation in the illegal cadaver trade, through grave robbing. There were many persons involved in the practice of grave robbing for the medical college, including various hired resurrectionists, medical students, the demonstrator of anatomy, as well as the professor of anatomy.

=== 2004 name change ===
The previous administration led by President Eugene P. Trani had pursued a policy of promoting the VCU name as a unified identity to the outside world. This policy had included directing faculty, staff, and students to use the VCU name, instead of MCV, in any official meetings or correspondence. This was accomplished by, first, the creation of the MCV Hospital Authority, ostensibly to better administer the MCV Hospitals, to a later name change of this Authority to the VCU Health System Authority (with MCV Hospitals being a component thereof). This Authority, under the direction of Sheldon Retchin MD, then went about changing the physical appearance of the structures and advertising materials, to include letterhead and websites. The faculty and medical students at that time were instructed to cease referring to the institution as the Medical College of Virginia. The main cited evidence for this was misrepresentation of the institution in the press. In 2004, Retchin sent an e-mail that described a 2003 front-page USA Today article that incorrectly referred to MCV as the "Virginia Medical College, a teaching arm of the University of Virginia", when in fact MCV is not a part of that university. The VCU Medical Center now resides on the MCV Campus of Virginia Commonwealth University. Since that time, the schools of that institution have been listed as a part of the VCU Medical Center rather than as a part of a university or college.

=== Research university ===
VCU expanded its research programs significantly over the decade since 2001 and has over $255 million in sponsored research. In 2010, VCU was selected by the NIH for a $20 million grant to become part of a nationwide consortium of research institutions working to turn laboratory discoveries into treatments for patients.

In 2006, VCU Health System received magnet status.

== Architecture and design ==
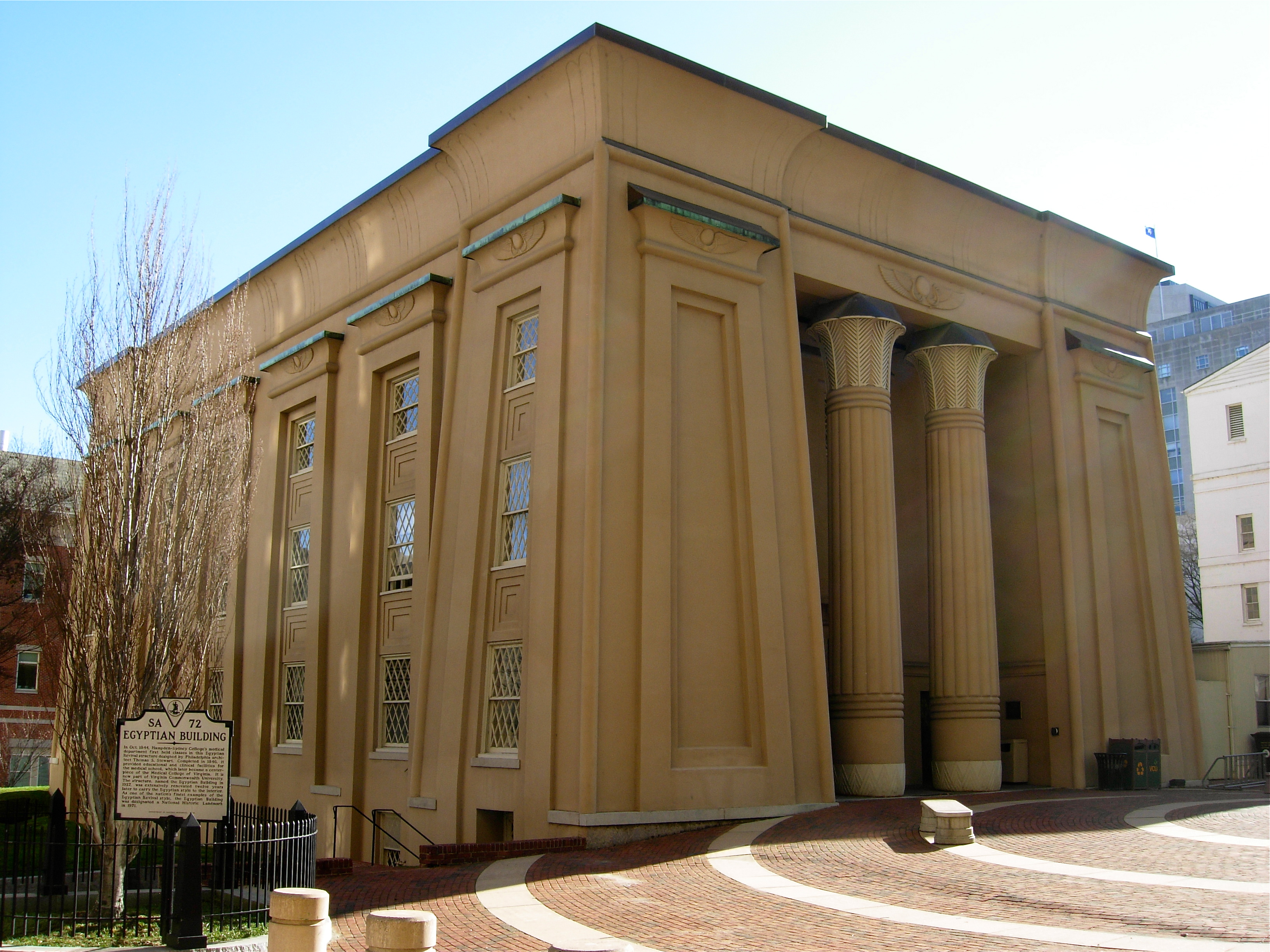
- Egyptian Building
  Egyptian Building – The Egyptian Building was to fulfill "his highest conception of a building adapted in every way to the purposes for which it was dedicated." The structure was completed in 1845. The building is unusual in having been constructed in the Egyptian Revival style. The only other university built in this style was the College of Cape Town, South Africa, now the University of Cape Town.
- The Three Bears – The sculpture of the Three Bears, which now sits on the first floor of the Gateway Building, has served as an unofficial mascot and symbol for the MCV Hospitals for more than sixty years. William T. Sanger, President of the Medical College of Virginia from 1925 to 1956, saw the original sculpture of the bear group in January 1940. The bears, created by noted American sculptor Anna Hyatt Huntington, were displayed at Brookgreen Gardens, the renowned sculpture garden and nature retreat created in South Carolina by Huntington and her husband Archer Milton Huntington. Sanger thought the bears would make a nice addition to the entrance court for the new Medical College of Virginia Hospital on Broad Street, which opened in January 1941. Huntington agreed to make a copy of the bears, and she and her husband donated the sculpture to the Medical College of Virginia on October 9, 1941. The copy of the bears was cast in stone, not the original gray bronze, because the metal was unavailable due to the war conditions in Europe. Sanger believed that the bears were an appropriate subject for a sculpture at a medical institution.
- The West Hospital – built in 1941, the 18 story West Hospital has 600 beds and exemplifies art deco architecture.
- The Centennial Dome – torn down in 2008 and replaced by the Larrick Student Center, the dome was built on the campus in 1961, was a major part of the city's commemoration of the centennial of the Civil War, and was operated by the Civil War Centennial Commission through 1965.

== Bibliography ==
- Hoke, Thelma (1963). The First 125 Years of the Medical College of Virginia. Medical College of Virginia. doi:10.21974/V43P7P.
