= Robert A. Winn =

American oncologist and academic

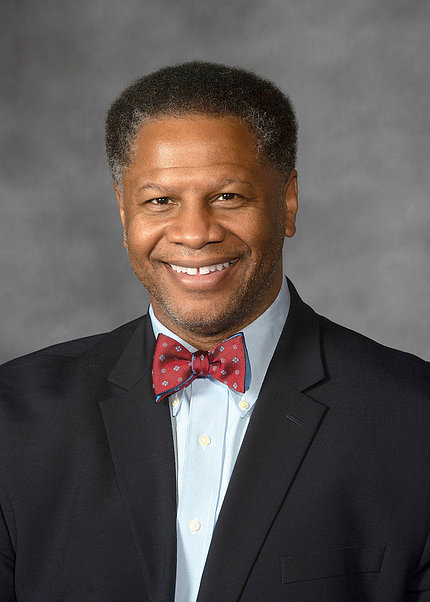
- Winn in 2021
- Education: University of Notre Dame (BS); University of Michigan (MD)
- Scientific career
- Workplaces: University of Illinois Hospital & Health Sciences System; University of Colorado Health Sciences Center; Virginia Commonwealth University

Robert A. Winn is an American pulmonologist who is the Cancer Center Director at Fox Chase Cancer Center and Senior Associate Dean for Cancer Research Innovation at the Lewis Katz School of Medicine at Temple University. His research considers the cellular mechanisms that drive the development of lung cancer. He has also investigated health disparities in cancer treatment and the development of strategies to eliminate mistrust amongst African-American communities.

== Early life and education ==
Winn was born and raised in Buffalo, New York. He was the first member of his family to attend college. He started studying psychology at the University of Notre Dame, where he was supported by a football scholarship. He was encouraged to train as a physician, and completed his MD at the University of Michigan. At Michigan, he was taught by Francis Collins, who inspired him to combine clinical practice and academic research. He specialized in internal medicine, and completed an internship and residency at Rush University Medical Center. Winn was then a fellow in pulmonary medicine at the University of Colorado Health Sciences Center. He became interested in lung cancer. At the time, the only treatments available were based on cisplatin, and the outcomes were not good.

== Research and career ==
Winn joined the faculty at the University of Colorado Health Sciences Center, where he held positions including associate dean. He researched cellular mechanisms that drive the development of lung cancer, and looked for the development of new diagnostic strategies. He campaigned to improve access to high-quality, low-density CT scans amongst underserved populations. He moved to the University of Illinois Hospital & Health Sciences System and in 2015 was appointed Director of the University of Illinois Cancer Center.

In 2019, Winn was appointed director of the Virginia Commonwealth University Cancer Center. At the time, he was the only African-American to be director of a National Cancer Institute cancer center. Alongside his research, Winn is committed to improving equity and inclusion in oncology. He has looked to improve trust amongst people who have previously been disenfranchised by their interactions with the medical sector. During the COVID-19 pandemic, Winn established "Facts & Faith Fridays", a conversation series that provided a forum for discussion between faith leaders, scientists and community members.

In 2026, Winn was appointed Cancer Center Director at Fox Chase Cancer Center and Professor in the Cancer Prevention and Control Program. He is also Senior Associate Dean for Cancer Research Innovation and Professor in the Department of Cancer and Cellular Biology at the Lewis Katz School of Medicine of Temple University.

In partnership with Bristol Myers Squibb Foundation, an independent charitable organization, Winn established a $100 million nonprofit, a workforce development award program for clinical researchers and medical students that aims to increase participation in clinical trials among underrepresented communities. The Robert A. Winn Excellence in Clinical Trials Awards Program trains physician-investigators to more engage communities in research and allows medical students from all backgrounds to explore clinical research careers.

Winn is president elect of the Association of American Cancer Institutes, is on the board of the American Cancer Society and LUNGevity, and the President's Advisory Council of Break Through Cancer (previously its Scientific Advisory Board).

== Awards and honors ==
- 2017 National Cancer Institute's Center to Reduce Cancer Health Disparities
- 2021 Association of American Cancer Institutes Cancer Health Equity Award

== Selected publications ==
- Pradeep R Rai; Carlyne D Cool; Judy A C King; Troy Stevens; Nana Burns; Robert A Winn; Michael Kasper; Norbert F Voelkel (2008). "The cancer paradigm of severe pulmonary arterial hypertension". American Journal of Respiratory and Critical Care Medicine. 178 (6): 558–564. doi:10.1164/rccm.200709-1369pp. PMC 2542431. PMID 18556624. Wikidata Q42682888.
- G Matute-Bello; R K Winn; M Jonas; E Y Chi; T R Martin; W C Liles (2001). "Fas (CD95) induces alveolar epithelial cell apoptosis in vivo: implications for acute pulmonary inflammation". The American Journal of Pathology. 158 (1): 153–161. doi:10.1016/s0002-9440(10)63953-3. PMC 1850249. PMID 11141488. Wikidata Q35746092.
- Giaquinto, Angela N.; Miller, Kimberly D.; Tossas, Katherine Y.; Winn, Robert A.; Jemal, Ahmedin; Siegel, Rebecca L. (10 February 2022). "Cancer statistics for African American/Black People 2022". CA: A Cancer Journal for Clinicians. 72 (3): 202–229. doi:10.3322/caac.21718. ISSN 0007-9235. PMID 35143040. S2CID 246701515.
