= List of African-American U.S. state firsts =

African Americans are a demographic minority in the United States. African-Americans' initial achievements in various fields historically establish a foothold, providing a precedent for more widespread cultural change. The shorthand phrase for this is "breaking the color barrier."

In addition to major national- and international-level firsts, African-Americans have achieved firsts on a statewide basis.

== 18th century ==
=== 1760s ===
- 1768

First African American elected to public office in the United States: Wentworth Cheswill

== 19th century ==
=== 1820s ===
- 1823

First African American to graduate from any college: Middlebury College : Alexander Twilight

- 1826

First African American to graduate from Amherst College, Amherst, Massachusetts: Edward Jones
First African American to graduate from Bowdoin College, Brunswick, Maine: John Brown Russwurm

- 1828

First African American to graduate from Ohio University: John Newton Templeton

=== 1830s ===
- 1832

First governor of African descent in what is now the US: Pío Pico, an Afro-Mexican, was the last governor of Alta California before it was ceded to the US. Like all Californios, Pico automatically became a US citizen in 1848. He was elected to the Los Angeles Common Council in 1853, but he did not assume office.

- 1834

First African American to study at Yale University (only allowed to audit classes at the Yale Divinity School): James W.C. Pennington

- 1836

First African American to graduate from any flagship state university and earn a bachelor's degree (from Newark College in Delaware): Isaiah DeGrasse
First African American to attend Western Reserve College: John Sykes Fayette

- 1838

First African American to graduate from the University of Vermont (Class of 1838): Andrew Harris

=== 1840s ===
- 1844

First African American to pass a state bar exam an become a licensed lawyer: Maine: Macon Bolling Allen

- 1847

First African American to graduate from Rush Medical College, Chicago, Illinois: David J. Peck

=== 1850s ===
- 1853

First African American known to graduate from Madison University, now known as Colgate University (AB degree): Henry Livingston Simpson

- 1854

First African American admitted to the Ohio bar: John Mercer Langston

- 1857

First African American to graduate from Yale University School of Medicine, New Haven, Connecticut: Cortlandt Creed
First African American to graduate from Yale University, New Haven, Connecticut: Richard Henry Greene

- 1859

First African American on the staff at Harvard University, Cambridge, Massachusetts: Aaron Molyneaux Hewlett

=== 1860s ===
- 1862

First African American to teach at the Penn School (now the Penn Center (Saint Helena Island, South Carolina): Charlotte Forten Grimké

- 1865

First African American to earn a Doctor of Medicine (MD) degree from Case Western Reserve University School of Medicine, Cleveland, Ohio: Charles Burleigh Purvis

- 1868

First elected African-American lieutenant governor: Oscar Dunn, Lieutenant Governor of Louisiana
First 33 African-American legislators in Georgia: see Original 33
First African American admitted to the University of Michigan Law School: Gabriel Franklin Hargo
First African American to serve in the Alabama Senate: Benjamin F. Royal
First African-American faculty member of the Howard University College of Medicine, Washington D.C.: Alexander Thomas Augusta

- 1869

First African-American woman to earn a medical degree in New York State: Susan McKinney Steward
First African-American teacher in the Little Rock, Arkansas (Pulaski County) school district: Charlotte Andrews Stephens
First African American to earn a law degree from Harvard University, Cambridge, Massachusetts: George Lewis Ruffin

=== 1870s ===
- 1870

First African-American senator from Mississippi: Hiram R. Revels (also first in U.S.)
First African American to graduate from the University of Michigan Law School: Gabriel Franklin Hargo
First African American from Alabama elected to serve in the U.S. House of Representatives: Benjamin S. Turner
First African American on the faculty at Berea College, Berea, Kentucky: Julia Britton Hooks
First African American to complete a BA at Harvard University, Cambridge, Massachusetts: Richard Theodore Greener
First African American professor at Harvard University: George Franklin Grant
First African American student enrolled at Cornell College of Mount Vernon, Iowa: Charles Ruff

- 1871

First African-American acting governor: Oscar James Dunn of Louisiana from May until August 9, 1871, when sitting Governor Warmoth was incapacitated and chose to recuperate in Mississippi. (see also: Douglas Wilder, 1990)
First two African Americans to earn a Doctor of Medicine (MD) degree from Howard University College of Medicine in Washington D.C.: James L.N. Bowen and George W. Brooks

- 1872

Second African-American acting governor of Louisiana: P. B. S. Pinchback (Also second in U.S.) (non-elected; see also Douglas Wilder, 1990) (Also first elected senator but was denied seat)
First African American to earn a Doctor of Medicine (MD) degree from the University of Michigan Medical School: William Henry Fitzbutler
First African-American Speaker of the Mississippi House of Representatives, and of any state legislature: John R. Lynch

- 1873

First African American elected to the Tennessee General Assembly: Sampson W. Keeble
First African-American professor of the University of South Carolina (USC): Richard Theodore Greener

- 1874

First African American to graduate from Newton Theological Institution: George Washington Williams
First African American to graduate from Bates College of Lewiston, Maine: Henry Wilkins Chandler
One of the first African Americans to graduate from Yale University, New Haven, Connecticut: Edward Alexander Bouchet (See also the 1857 Richard Henry Greene entry)

- 1875

First African American to attend and graduate from the School of the Art Institute of Chicago in the early 1870s: Lottie Wilson Jackson
First African American to complete a BA (art and the law) at the University of South Carolina: Thomas McCants Stewart
First African American to complete a BA at the University of Wisconsin: William Smith Noland

- 1876

First African American elected to the Illinois General Assembly: John W. E. Thomas
First African-American woman to be admitted to the University of Michigan: Mary Henrietta Graham
First African American to enroll in the University of Kansas: Lizzie Ann Smith
First African American to earn a Ph.D. from an American university as well as the sixth American of any race to earn a Ph.D. in physics (Yale University, New Haven, Connecticut): Edward Bouchet
First African-American woman to earn an M.D. from Syracuse University School of Medicine, now known as State University of New York Upstate Medical University: Sarah Loguen Fraser

- 1877

First African American to graduate from Boston University School of Law: Emanuel Molyneaux Hewlett
First African American to earn a Doctor of Medicine (MD) degree from Meharry Medical College in Nashville, Tennessee: James Monroe Jamison
First African American to graduate from Brown University, Providence, Rhode Island: Inman E. Page

- 1878

First African American elected mayor in New York State (village president of Cleveland): Ned Sherman
First African American appointed an officer of the Boston Police Department: Horatio J. Homer

- 1879

First African American elected to the Wyoming Legislature: William Jefferson Hardin
First African American elected to the Ohio General Assembly: George Washington Williams
First African American to graduate from Grinnell College, Grinnell, Iowa: Hannibal Kershaw
First African American to graduate from the University of Iowa College of Law: Alexander G. Clark Jr.

=== 1880s ===
- 1880

First African American elected to the Indiana General Assembly: James Sidney Hinton
First African American to graduate from the University of Michigan: Mary Henrietta Graham
First African American elected to the Ohio General Assembly: George Washington Williams
First African American graduate of Maryville College, Maryville, Tennessee: William Henderson Franklin

- 1881

First African American to head a hospital under civilian authority when appointed by President Chester Arthur as Surgeon-in-Charge at the Freedmen's Hospital, Washington D.C.: Charles Burleigh Purvis
First African American to enroll at the University of California at Berkeley (no record of graduation): Alexander Jones
First African American to graduate from the University of Pennsylvania School of Dental Medicine: James Brister

- 1882

First African American to earn a Doctor of Medicine (MD) degree from the University of Pennsylvania School of Medicine: Nathan Francis Mossell
First African American to graduate from the University of Minnesota (B.A. degree): Andrew F. Hilyer

- 1883

Founded the first school for black children in Augusta, Georgia and was principal for 50 years for the Haines Institute for Industrial and Normal Education: Lucy Craft Laney
First African American to earn a Doctor of Medicine (MD) degree from Wayne State University School of Medicine in Detroit, Michigan: Robert J. Boland
First African American to graduate from the College at Penn (Bachelor of Arts degree): William Adger

- 1884

First African American woman to practice medicine in Ohio: Consuelo Clark-Stewart
First African American to graduate from the New York State Normal School, which would become the University at Albany, SUNY (graduated with a teaching certificate): Evelena Williams
First African American to graduate from the University of Nebraska College of Medicine in Omaha and the first African-American doctor in the state of Nebraska: Matthew Ricketts
First African American to graduate from the law program of Columbia College of Law (later George Washington University), earning an LL.B. in 1884 and LL.M. in 1885: Samuel Laing Williams

- 1885

First African American elected to the Rhode Island General Assembly: Mahlon Van Horne
First African-American woman to graduate from the University of Michigan Medical School and the first faculty member of Spelman College where she established its nurse training program: Sophia B. Jones
First African American to complete a BA at the University of Kansas: Blanche Ketene Bruce

- 1886

First African American dentist to be licensed and practice in the state of Virginia: Charles B. Jackson

- 1887

First documented African-American woman to graduate from an Indiana college or university when she completed a BA at Butler University: Gertrude Amelia Mahorney
First African American to receive the Ph.D. degree from Boston University: John W. E. Bowen Sr.

- 1888

First African-American woman to become a licensed doctor in the U.S. state of Massachusetts: Juan Bennett Drummond
First African American to earn a law degree at the University of Pennsylvania Law School: Aaron Albert Mossell
First African-American medical doctor of Durham, North Carolina: Aaron McDuffie Moore
First African-American woman and first woman to practice medicine in the state of Mississippi: Verina Morton Jones
Reportedly the first African American elected to the Kansas legislature: Alfred Fairfax

- 1889

First African-American female principal in Massachusetts and the Northeastern United States: Maria Louise Baldwin, supervising white faculty and a predominantly white student body at the Agassiz Grammar School in Cambridge, Massachusetts (renamed the Maria L. Baldwin School in 2004).
First African American to pass the California Board of Medical Examination: Monroe Alpheus Majors
First African American admitted to practice law in Nebraska: Silas Robbins
First African-American woman to graduate from Spencerian College of Commerce in Philadelphia, Pennsylvania: Addie Waites Hunton
First African-American nun to serve in the state of Georgia: Mathilda Beasley
First African-American woman to complete a Bachelor of Music (piano performance) at Oberlin Conservatory, Oberlin, Ohio: Harriet Gibbs Marshall

=== 1890s ===
- 1890

First African American chosen to deliver a Harvard University senior class oration (Cambridge, Massachusetts): Clement G. Morgan
First African-American woman to graduate from the University of Michigan School of Dentistry and the first African-American woman to open a dental practice in Cincinnati, Ohio: Ida Gray
First African American to graduate from Cincinnati Law School: William Parham
First African-American woman to complete a BS and an MA at Cornell University of Ithaca, New York: Jane Eleanor Datcher
First African-American woman to graduate from the University of Pennsylvania: Ida Elizabeth (Bowser) Asbury
First African American to graduate from Cornell Law School: George Washington Fields

- 1891

First woman to be licensed as a physician in the U.S. state of Alabama: Halle Tanner Dillon Johnson
First African American to play on the Nebraska Cornhuskers football team, among the first Black college football players nationwide: George Flippin
First African-American woman physician to practice in Nassau County, New York: Verina Morton Jones
First African-American woman physician in the state of Georgia: Alice Woodby McKane

- 1892

First African American to receive a graduate degree at the University of Cincinnati in Cincinnati, Ohio: Charles Henry Turner
First African-American woman to work as a resident in the Howard University gynecology clinic Washington D.C.: Julia R. Hall
First African American to graduate from Rutgers University New Jersey: James Dickson Carr
First African American to graduate from Ohio State University: Sherman Hamlin Guss

- 1893

First African-American member elected to the Michigan House of Representatives: William Webb Ferguson
First African-American woman to become a licensed surgeon and physician in Tennessee: Georgia E. L. Patton Washington
First African American and the first woman to pass the Virginia Medical Examining Board's examination:Sarah Garland Boyd Jones
First African American elected to the Nebraska House of Representatives when the body had two houses: Matthew Ricketts
First African-American to graduate from the Western University of Pennsylvania: William Hunter Dammond
First African-American woman to graduate from the Minnesota State Academy for the Deaf: Blanche Wilkins Williams

- 1894

First African-American woman to graduate from Chicago College of Law and the first African-American woman licensed to practice law in Illinois: Ida Platt
First African American to graduate from Iowa State Agricultural College (now Iowa State University) in Ames: George Washington Carver

- 1895

First African American to graduate and earn a degree (mathematics) from Indiana University: Marcellus Neal
First African American to graduate from the University of Nebraska: George Flippin
First African-American woman to earn a doctor of medicine (MD) degree from Northwestern University: Emma Ann Reynolds
First African Americans firefighters in Omaha, Nebraska
First African American to earn a degree at Princeton University (Master of Arts degree): Irwin William Langston Roundtree

- 1896

First African-American woman appointed to the school board of a major city, serving Washington D.C. until 1906: Mary Church Terrell
First African American to serve on the faculty of Iowa State Agricultural College (now Iowa State University) in Ames: George Washington Carver

- 1897

First African-American woman licensed to practice medicine in the U.S. state of Georgia: Eliza Ann Grier
First African-American woman licensed to practice medicine in South Carolina: Matilda Evans
First African-American woman physician in Indianapolis: Beulah Wright Porter
First African American to earn a Doctor of Medicine (MD) degree from the University of Illinois College of Medicine: Rivers Frederick
First African-American woman to open a dental practice in Chicago, Illinois: Ida Gray
First African American to graduate from Vassar College (by passing for white): Anita Florence Hemmings
First African-American woman to graduate from Bates College of Lewiston, Maine: Stella James Sims
First African-American woman to earn an M.D. degree from Howard University College of Medicine: Eunice P. Shadd

- 1898

First African-American member elected to the Minnesota House of Representatives: John Francis Wheaton
First woman to teach law in a chartered law school when she joined the faculty of her alma mater, Central Tennessee College of Law: Lutie Lytle
First African-American woman to graduate from medical school and to practice medicine in Louisiana: Emma Wakefield-Paillet
First African-American woman to register as a licensed physician in Kentucky: Artishia Gilbert
First African American to earn a Doctor of Medicine (MD) degree from Yale School of Medicine New Haven, Connecticut: William F. Penn
First African American on record to graduate from the University of Iowa: Samuel Joe Brown
First African-American woman to graduate from Radcliffe College (now part of Harvard University): Alberta Virginia Scott

- 1899

First African American to graduate from the University of Idaho: Jennie Eva Hughes
First African-American woman elected to Phi Beta Kappa: Mary Annette Anderson

== 20th century ==
=== 1900s ===
- 1900

First African American columnist to regularly write for a white newspaper in Indiana: Lillian Thomas Fox
First African American to graduate from the University of Illinois: William Walter Smith
First African American to graduate from Drexel University, Philadelphia, Pennsylvania (diploma in architectural drawing): William Sidney Pittman
First African American to graduate from Smith College, Northampton, Massachusetts, receiving a B.A. degree in Classics: Otelia Cromwell
First African American to graduate from the Denver School of Music: Emma Azalia Hackley
First African American to graduate from Cornell College of Mount Vernon, Iowa: Frank Jeremiah Armstrong

- 1901

First African American to earn his Doctor of Medicine (M.D.) degree from Jefferson Medical College, Philadelphia, Pennsylvania: Algernon B. Jackson
First African American to attend and earn a degree from the University of Massachusetts Amherst (then Massachusetts Agricultural College): George Ruffin Bridgeforth

- 1902

First African-American woman physician licensed in Colorado: Justina Ford
First African-American woman physician licensed in Lexington, Kentucky: Mary E. Britton
First African American to graduate from the University of Pennsylvania Department of Architecture: Julian Abele
First woman and first African American woman licensed to practice law in the state of Maryland: Etta Haynie Maddox

- 1903

First African-American lawyer in the state of Oregon: McCants Stewart
First African American to graduate with an undergraduate degree from Northwestern University: Lawyer Taylor

- 1904

First African-American woman to graduate from Beloit College, Beloit, Wisconsin: Grace Ousley
First African American to graduate from State Agricultural College (later Michigan State University): William O. Thompson
First African-American woman admitted to the Kentucky Bar: Sally J. Seals White
First African American to graduate from the University of Southern California School of Law: C. Bertrand Thompson

- 1905

First African-American to earn a doctorate degree in educational psychology (University of Chicago, Chicago, Illinois): Charles Henry Thompson
First African American to graduate from the University of California at Berkeley: Charles E. Carpenter
First African-American woman to complete a BS (modern languages) Ohio State University: Jessie Frances Stephens
First African American to graduate from Penn State University: Calvin H. Waller
First African-American woman to graduate from Cornell University, Ithaca, New York: Jessie R. Fauset
First African-American woman to complete a (Bachelor of Philosophy at Brown University: Ethel Ester Maria Tremaine Robinson
First African-American woman to graduate with an undergraduate degree from Northwestern University: Naomi Pollard Dobson

- 1906

First African-American elected to the Wisconsin Legislature: Lucian H. Palmer
First African American to earn a Doctor in Medicine (MD) from Jefferson Medical College, Philadelphia, Pennsylvania: Henry McKee Minton
First African American president of Atlanta Baptist College, Georgia: John Hope
First African-American woman to graduate from the University of Illinois Urbana-Champaign (graduated with honors in three years with degrees in astronomy and mathematics): Maudelle Bousfield
First African-American woman to practice medicine in Atlanta, Georgia: Georgia Dwelle

- 1907

First African American to earn a Doctor in Medicine (MD) degree from the University of Iowa College of Medicine: Edward Albert Carter
First African American to earn a Doctor in Medicine (MD) degree from the University of Colorado School of Medicine: Samuel L. Raines
First African American to earn a Ph.D. from the University of Chicago (zoology): Charles Henry Turner
First African-American woman to graduate from Michigan Agricultural College (later Michigan State University): Myrtle Craig Mowbray
First African American to graduate from Kalamazoo College, Kalamazoo, Michigan: Charles Lewis Williams Jr.

- 1908

First African American to receive his license by passing the Kentucky state medical licensing board exam: William H. Perry Sr.
First African-American woman to graduate from Northwestern University with a dental degree: Olive Myrtle Henderson
First African American to earn a Doctor of Medicine degree from the Indiana University School of Medicine: Clarence Augustus Lucas

- 1909

First African-American woman to graduate from the University of California at Berkeley: Vivian Rogers
First African American to graduate from Harvard Divinity School: Edmund Harrison Oxley
First African American to graduate from the University of Pittsburgh School of Law (Pitt Law): Robert Lee Vann
First African American to graduate from the University of Southern California School of Dentistry: John Alexander Somerville

=== 1910s ===
- 1910

First African-American woman to pass the Georgia State Board Dental Examination: Ida Mae Johnson Hiram
First African-American woman to earn a bachelor’s degree at the University of Pittsburgh (physics and mathematics): Jean Hamilton Walls

- 1911

First African American to graduate from Valparaiso College Medical Department, Valparaiso, Indiana: Carl Glennis Roberts
First African American to graduate with a bachelor's degree from the University at Albany, SUNY: Georgine Lewis

- 1912

First African American to graduate from the engineering program of the University of Iowa (civil engineering): Archie Alexander
First African-American woman to graduate from Temple University medical school (earning a doctor of medicine (M.D.) degree): Agnes Berry Montier
First African-American woman to graduate from Howard University School of Medicine: L. Eudora Ashburne
First African-American woman to graduate from Yale School of Music: Helen Eugenia Hagan

- 1913

First African-American graduate of State Normal School of San Diego (now San Diego State University): Henrietta Goodwin

- 1914

Founded the first hospital in the city of Evanston, Illinois that would serve African-American patients: Isabella Garnett and her husband Dr. Arthur Butler
First African-American woman to graduate from the University of Pittsburgh School of Pharmacy, Pennsylvania: Ella P. Stewart
First African American to graduate from the University of Rhode Island: Harvey Robert Turner

- 1915

First African American and first woman to graduate from the University of Hawaiʻi (master’s degree in chemistry): Alice Ball
Possibly the first African American to graduate from Suffolk Law School, Boston, Massachusetts: Thomas Vreeland Jones (Father of Lois Mailou Jones)
First African American to graduate from Macalester College, Saint Paul, Minnesota, before going to medical school and pursuing a career in medical science: Catharine Deaver Lealtad
First African American to earn a degree from Cornell University Medical College, New York City: Roscoe Conkling Giles
First African-American graduate of the Indiana Public Library Commission Summer School for Librarians (later the Indiana University School of Library and Information Science) and the earliest known formally trained African American librarian in Indiana: Lillian Haydon Childress Hall
First African-American woman to graduate from the Columbia School of Social Work: Winona Cargile Alexander

- 1916

First African-American woman to practice dentistry in Cambridge, Massachusetts: Edna C. Robinson Brown
First African-American woman to graduate from the School of Pharmacy at University of Pittsburgh, and the first African-American woman licensed to practice pharmacology in the state of Pennsylvania: Ella P. Stewart
First African Americans to graduate from Ohio State University College of Medicine: Clarence Alphonso Lindsay, Rudolph Finley and Charles Robert Lewis
First African-American woman to graduate from Ohio University (graduated summa cum laude): Martha Jane Hunley

- 1917

First African American to enter the University of Oregon: Mabel Byrd
First African American to give a recital in Symphony Hall (Boston): Roland Hayes

- 1918

First African-American elected to political office in California: Frederick Madison Roberts, California State Assembly
First African-American student at Hamline University in Minnesota: Anna Arnold Hedgeman
First African-American woman to run for legislative office in the state of Washington: Alice S. Presto
First African American to graduate from the University of Colorado was most likely: Lucille Buchanan Jones
First African American to graduate from the Connecticut Agricultural College (now the University of Connecticut): Alan Thacker Busby
First African-American woman lawyer in Iowa: Gertrude Rush
First African American to graduate from Millikin University: Fred T. Long
First African-American woman to graduate from the University of Wisconsin-Madison: Mabel Raimey
First African-American woman to graduate from the University of Southern California School of Dentistry: Vada Somerville

- 1919

First African-American woman to be appointed a police officer at the Los Angeles Police Department (LAPD): Georgia Ann Robinson
First African-American woman to graduate from Indiana University (Bachelor of Arts (A.B.) degree in English): Frances Marshall
First African-American woman admitted to the Alabama State Bar: Estelle Henderson
First African-American woman admitted to practice law in the state of Ohio: Daisy D. Perkins
First African Americans elected to the New York City Board of Aldermen: Charles H. Roberts and George W. Harris

=== 1920s ===
- 1920

First African-American elected to the Missouri legislature: Walthall Moore
First African-American librarian hired by the New York Public Library (NYPL): Catherine Allen Latimer
First African-American woman to graduate from the Tufts University School of Dental Medicine, Boston, Massachusetts, and the only woman in her graduating class: Jessie G. Garnett
First African-American registered nurse in the state of Georgia: Ludie Clay Andrews
First African-American woman to graduate from any law school in the state of Illinois (Chicago Law School): Violette Neatley Anderson

- 1921

First African-American faculty member of Amherst College, Amherst, Massachusetts (chemistry): Robert Percy Barnes
First African-American woman admitted to the bar in Minnesota: Lena O. Smith

- 1922

First African American to graduate from Hamline University in Minnesota: Anna Arnold Hedgeman
First African-American woman to work for the Louisville Metro Police Department: Bertha Whedbee
First African American to graduate from the University of Montana: James W. Dorsey
First African-American woman admitted to and graduate from the Library School of the New York Public Library (the school merged in 1926 with the New York State Library School to become Columbia University School of Library Service): Nella Larsen
First African-American women to graduate from New York University Law School: Anna Jones Robinson and Enid Foderingham
First African-American woman to graduate from a Michigan law school (Detroit College of Law): Barbara F. Keene

- 1923

First African-American woman lawyer in the state of Massachusetts: Blanche E. Braxton
First African-American woman lawyer in the state of Michigan: Grace G. Costavas Murphy

- 1924

First African-American elected to the Illinois Senate: Adelbert Roberts
First African American to graduate from the University of Chicago Pritzker School of Medicine: James Lowell Hall, Sr.
First African-American woman to graduate from Fordham University School of Law (New York City), where she graduated cum laude: Ruth Whitehead Whaley
First woman from Georgia and the first African-American woman in the nation to serve on the National Republican Committee; later in the same year, first woman in U.S. history accorded the floor of the National Republican Convention: Mamie George S. Williams
First African-American woman to graduate from the New England Conservatory of Music: Gladys A. Moore Perdue
First African-American woman to graduate from the University of Iowa's College of Law: Beulah Wheeler
First African American and first woman to serve on the Chicago Library Board: Fannie Barrier Williams

- 1925

First African American woman admitted to Barnard college in New York City: Zora Neale Hurston
First African-American woman to graduate from Arizona State University: Stella McHenry
First African-American woman to pass the Virginia bar and become a lawyer in the state: Lavinia Marian Fleming Poe
First African American graduate of Loyola University Chicago School of Law Illinois (earning a Bachelor of Laws (LLB) degree): Leroy J. Knox

- 1926

First African-American woman to graduate from Bellevue Hospital Medical College, now NYU Grossman School of Medicine, New York: May Edward Chinn
First African American to graduate with a Master of Arts (MA) degree from the University of Oregon: William Sherman Savage
First African American to graduate from the University of New Hampshire: Elizabeth Virgil
First African American president of Howard University, Washington D.C.: Mordecai Wyatt Johnson
First African American to graduate from an Oregon public university (Oregon State University), Corvallis, Oregon: Carrie Halsell Ward (Bachelor of Science degree in Business)
First African-American woman to earn a Ph.D. from Yale University, New Haven, Connecticut: Otelia Cromwell
First African-American woman admitted to the District of Columbia bar by examination: Ollie May Cooper

- 1927

First African-American woman to receive a law degree from the University of Pennsylvania Law School: Sadie T. M. Alexander
First African-American graduate of Western Michigan Teachers College: Merze Tate
First African American to earn a degree from the University of Maine at Orono: Ada Viola Peters Smith
First African-American woman to pass the bar and practice law in Wisconsin: Mabel Raimey
First woman to earn the Master of Laws degree from Loyola University Chicago School of Law Illinois: Edith S. Sampson

- 1928

First African-American woman legislator in the United States when she was appointed to the West Virginia House of Delegates: Minnie Buckingham Harper
First African-American woman to graduate from Barnard College, New York City: Zora Neale Hurston
First African-American woman to enroll in the Curtiss Wright School of Aeronautics in Chicago, Illinois: Janet Bragg

- 1929

First African American dean of the Howard University College of Medicine (Washington D.C.): Numa P. G. Adams
First African American president of Atlanta University: John Hope
First African-American woman to graduate from the University of Nebraska and the first African-American woman admitted to practice law in Nebraska: Zanzye H.A. Hill
First African-American woman lawyer in the state of California: Annie Coker

=== 1930s ===
- 1930

First African Americans elected as judges in the state of New York: James S. Watson and Charles E. Toney
First African-American woman to graduate from the University of Cincinnati Law School: Helen Elsie Austin
First woman president of Tillotson College (now Huston–Tillotson University), a HBCU in Austin, Texas and the first woman to head an accredited college in Texas: Mary Elizabeth Branch
First African American to graduate from the University of Nevada (Bachelor of Science degree in electrical engineering): Theodore Harry Miller
First African American to graduate from Crozer Theological Seminary, Upland, Pennsylvania: Elmer P. Gibson
First African-American police lieutenant in St. Louis, Missouri: Ira L. Cooper
First African-American woman to graduate from the University of Dayton (bachelor degree in education): Jessie Scott Hathcock
First African-American woman graduate of the University of Vermont: Edna Hall Brown

- 1931

First African-American woman licensed as a pharmacist in the state of Iowa: Gwendolyn Wilson Fowler
First African-American physician admitted to membership in the Philadelphia Neurological Society: R. Wellesley Bailey
First African-American woman to graduate from Yale Law School: Jane Bolin

- 1932

First African-American woman to receive a law degree from Fordham University in New York City: Eunice Carter
First African American to earn degree from California Institute of Technology (Bachelor of Science in civil engineering: Grant Delbert Venerable
First African American to earn a Ph.D. from the University of Minnesota (biochemistry): Vernon Alexander Wilkerson
First African-American library manager in the Chicago Public Library system: Vivian G. Harsh
First African American to graduate from Syracuse University Law School: Conrad Lynn
First African-American woman to earn a Master of Library and Information Science (MLS) degree in Columbia University, New York: Dorothy B. Porter
First African-American woman to graduate from Penn State University (graduated with honors from the home economics department): Mildred Settle

- 1933

First African American soloist to perform with the all-white Chicago Symphony Orchestra: Margaret Bonds
First African American to earn a Ph.D. in chemistry at Harvard University: Robert Percy Barnes
First African-American woman physician to practice in the state of Maryland: N. Louise Young
First African-American woman admitted to the North Carolina bar, but she never practiced in the state: Ruth Whitehead Whaley
First African-American woman to receive a master’s degree in home economics at Iowa State College of Agriculture and Mechanic Arts, now known as Iowa State University: Willie Lee Glass

- 1934

First African American to earn a Ph.D. in history from Ohio State University: W. Sherman Savage
First African American admitted to the Cleveland School of Art, Ohio: Charles L. Sallée Jr

- 1935

First African-American woman to work as a prosecutor in the New York County (Manhattan) District Attorney’s Office: Eunice Carter
First African-American woman to earn a degree at the University of Oxford (bachelor of literature degree (B.Litt.) in international relations): Merze Tate
First African American to earn a Ph.D. in agronomy from Massachusetts State College: Major Franklin Spaulding
First African American to earn a Doctor of Medicine from the University of Cincinnati College of Medicine: Lucy Oxley
First African American on record to graduate from the University of Arizona (a Bachelor of Arts degree in history): Elgie Mike Batteau

- 1936

First African-American woman to earn a Ph.D. at Cornell University (Home Economics): Flemmie Pansy Kittrell
First African American woman appointed as a New York City public school principal: Gertrude Elise Ayer
First African-American woman to earn a bachelor's degree in architectural engineering from the University of Illinois: Beverly Lorraine Greene

- 1937

First African American and first woman appointed as an assistant attorney general in Ohio: Helen Elsie Austin
First African-American woman to graduate from Grinnell College, in Grinnell, Iowa: Edith Renfrow Smith
First African American hired as a policeman by the Baltimore Police Department: Violet Hill Whyte
First African American to join the faculty of the University of Illinois College of Medicine: Roosevelt Brooks
First African-American artist to be given a one-person show at the Museum of Modern Art in New York City: William Edmondson
First African-American woman to earn a Ph.D. in Sociology at the University of Pennsylvania: Anna Johnson Julian
First African American graduate of New Mexico College of Agriculture and Mechanic Arts (now New Mexico State University): Clara Belle Williams

- 1938

First African-American woman to be elected to the Pennsylvania General Assembly and to any state legislature: Crystal Bird Fauset
First African-American woman from the state of Florida to graduate from an accredited law school (Howard University Law School): Blanche Armwood
First African American to graduate from the University of New Mexico: Oliver LaGrone
First African-American woman to earn a Ph.D. degree from the University of Pittsburgh: Jean Hamilton Walls
First African-American woman lawyer in South Carolina: Cassandra E. Maxwell

- 1939

First African-American woman to own a cosmetology school in Iowa: Pauline Brown Humphrey
First African American to serve on the Los Angeles Board of Education: Fay Allen
First African American to earn a Ph.D. in a physical science (physics) from the University of Cincinnati: Herman Branson
First African Americans to graduate from the University of North Dakota: Fritz Pollard Jr. and Horace Johnson

=== 1940s ===
- 1940

First African-American graduate of the University of Minnesota Medical School, Minneapolis, Minnesota: Paul P. Boswell
First African American to earn a Ph.D. degree from Columbia University (psychology): Kenneth Clark
First African American to earn a Master of Fine Arts (M.F.A.) degree from the University of Iowa: Elizabeth Catlett

- 1941

First African-American woman to earn a Ph.D. in government and international relations from Harvard University (then Radcliffe College): Merze Tate
First African American to earn a Ph.D. in engineering (Bachelor of Science degree in civil engineering from Iowa State University): Walter T. Daniels
First woman to earn a Ph.D. in science from Fordham University (botany): Marie Taylor
First African-American dean of Meharry Medical College, Nashville, Tennessee: Michael J. Bent
First African American to earn a Doctor of Medicine from the University of Kansas School of Medicine: Edward Vernon Williams
First African American hired by the San Francisco transit: Audley Cole
First African American (and at age 26 the youngest person) to conduct the New York Philharmonic Orchestra: Dean Dixon
First African American to earn a Ph.D. in mathematics from the University of Illinois Urbana-Champaign: David Blackwell
First African-American woman to earn a Ph.D. in anatomy from Western Reserve University: Ruth Smith Lloyd
First African American to earn a Ph.D. degree at the University of Iowa and in the state of Iowa (among the first African-American women to earn a Ph.D. in history in the United States): Lulu Johnson
First African-American woman known to receive a graduate degree in physics (master's degree at the University of Michigan): Carolyn Parker
First African American to earn a Ph.D. degree from Ohio State University in chemistry: Thomas Nelson Baker Jr.

- 1942

First African-American woman to publish a novel in South Carolina: Annie Greene Nelson
First African-American woman to graduate from Lincoln University School of Law and to be admitted to practice law in Missouri: Dorothy L. Freeman

- 1943

Baltimore Police Department African-American officers were allowed to wear police uniforms.
First African American to earn a Ph.D. in chemistry from the University of California, Berkeley: Lloyd Noel Ferguson
First African-American engineer licensed in the state of Louisiana: Walter T. Daniels
First African-American woman to earn a Doctor of Medicine (MD) degree from Wayne State University School of Medicine in Detroit, Michigan: Helen Marjorie Peebles-Meyers
First African-American woman to earn a Ph.D. degree from Columbia University (psychology): Mamie Clark
First African-American woman streetcar operator in San Francisco: Maya Angelou
First African-American librarian in the city of Denver, Colorado: Pauline Short Robinson
First African Americans to be admitted to Swarthmore College, Swarthmore, Pennsylvania: Gloria Clement and Dorothea Kopchynski
First African-American woman admitted to the State Bar of Georgia: Rachel E. Pruden-Herndon

- 1944

First African-American woman to graduate from the University of Michigan Law School and pass the bar exam: Jane Cleo Marshall Lucas
First African-American librarian to work at the Carnegie Library of Pittsburgh: Vivian Davidson Hewitt

- 1945

First African-American woman to graduate from Columbia Law School in New York City: Elreta Alexander-Ralston
First African American to be elected to Congress from New York, as well as the first from any state in the Northeast: Adam Clayton Powell Jr.
First African American to perform in The Town Hall (New York City): George Walker
First African-American woman to graduate from Yale Divinity School: Rena Karefa-Smart

- 1946

First African American to graduate from a nursing program in Colorado (University of Colorado School of Nursing): Zipporah Parks Hammond
First African-American woman to pass the Maryland bar exam and be admitted to practice law in Maryland: Jane Cleo Marshall Lucas
First African-American physician to work at the Newark City Hospital, Newark, New Jersey: Ernest Mae McCarroll
First African-American president of Fisk University, Nashville, Tennessee: Charles S. Johnson
First African American to earn an accounting degree from Creighton University, Omaha, Nebraska: William Alfred Woods
First African-American woman to earn a Ph.D. degree in history from Ohio State University: Helen G. Edmonds
First African-American woman to graduate from the University of Chicago Law School: Jewel Lafontant
Likely the first African-American woman to earn a pilot’s license in the state of Texas: Azellia White

- 1947

First African-American woman to graduate in medicine from Ohio State University: Clotilde Dent Bowen
First African-American woman licensed to practice law in North Carolina: Elreta Alexander-Ralston
First African American to earn a Ph.D. in pharmacy from Ohio State University: Roy Clifford Darlington
First African American woman to graduate from DePaul College of Law: Odas Nicholson
First African Americans to graduate from the University of Notre Dame, Indiana: Frazier Thompson and Carl Richard Coggins
First African American faculty member at the University of Iowa: Philip G. Hubbard
First African American to earn an undergraduate degree at Princeton University: John Leroy Howard

- 1948

First African American elected to the Delaware House of Representatives: William J. Winchester
First African-American female attorney admitted to the Alabama State Bar: Mahala Ashley Dickerson
First African Americans hired by the Atlanta Police Department: Henry Hooks, Claude Dixon, Ernest H. Lyons, Robert McKibbens, Willard Strickland, Willie T. Elkins, Johnnie P. Jones, and John Sanders
First African Americans admitted to the Georgetown University Law Center: Winston A. Douglas, Elmer W. Henderson, William D. Martin and Lutrelle F. Parker
First African American admitted to the University of Arkansas School of Law since Reconstruction and the first black student to be admitted for graduate or professional studies at any all-white university in the former Confederacy: Silas Herbert Hunt
First African American to complete a residency at the New York Psychiatric Institute and the first African-American trainee to be certified in psychoanalysis at Columbia University's Columbia Psychoanalytic Center (New York): Margaret Morgan Lawrence
First African-American physician appointed to the West Virginia State Board of Health: Peyton Randolph Higginbotham
First African-American woman to graduate from Creighton University Law School: Elizabeth Pittman
First African American male student to graduate from Oregon State University (OSU), (Corvallis, Oregon): William Tebeau
First African-American woman to be accepted at the University of Arkansas for Medical Sciences and the first African-American woman to be accepted in any medical school in the Southern United States: Edith Irby Jones
First African American to graduate from the UC Berkeley College of Engineering (Bachelor of Science degree in civil engineering): Howard P. Grant
First African-American woman dentist to practice in the state of Mississippi: Mavis N. Jones
First African American faculty member at the University of Massachusetts: Edwin D. Driver
First African American and first African-American woman faculty member at the University of Minnesota: Ruby Pernell

- 1949

First African American admitted to the University of Oklahoma College of Law: Ada Lois Sipuel Fisher
First African American to be appointed president of the Commission of the Detroit Department of Public Welfare: Rosa Slade Gragg
First African American appointed building inspector for the city of Detroit, Michigan: Everod A. Coleman
First African American certified by the Missouri State Medical Society: William D. Mormon
First African-American physician appointed to the medical staff of Boston City Hospital (Massachusetts): Charles D. Bonner
First African-American woman to join the medical staff at Washington University School of Medicine, and the first African-American woman to join the staff of St. Louis Children's Hospital, both located in St. Louis, Missouri: Helen Elizabeth Nash
First African American appointed professor at Harvard University (clinical professor of bacteriology and immunology): William Augustus Hinton
First African-American nurse elected to the board of directors of the Florida State Nurses Association (FSNA): Mary Elizabeth Carnegie
First African-American physician to work in a Denver, Colorado hospital: Edmond Noel (spouse of Rachel Noel)
First African-American woman to train and to become a faculty member at Massachusetts General Hospital: Frances Jones Bonner
First African American faculty member at the University of Wisconsin: Cornelius Golightly

=== 1950s ===
- 1950

First African-American woman to be elected to the West Virginia Legislature: Elizabeth Simpson Drewry
First African-American woman to be elected to the Michigan Legislature: Charline White
First African-American woman to graduate from the University of Maryland School of Law and to practice law in the state of Maryland: Juanita Jackson Mitchell
First African American urologist to practice in the state of Virginia: Silas Odell Binns
First African American to serve on the board of Omaha Public Schools, Omaha, Nebraska: Elizabeth Pittman
First African American woman to graduate from Saint Louis University, St. Louis, Missouri with honors (magna cum laude) earning a Bachelor of Science degree: Anita Lyons Bond
First African Americans elected to the Arizona Legislature (Arizona House of Representatives): Carl Sims and Hayzel Burton Daniels
First African American student admitted to the University of Missouri: Gus Ridgel
First African American to graduate from Siena University (New York) (degree in chemistry): Albert Mattingly

- 1951

Second African-American woman admitted to the Indiana bar: Mahala Ashley Dickerson
First African American undergraduate admitted to the University of Maryland at College Park: Hiram Whittle
First African American to earn a Ph.D. in physiology from the University of Illinois: Edward William Hawthorne
First African-American woman to earn a Doctor of Medicine (MD) from Harvard Medical School, Boston, Massachusetts: Mildred Fay Jefferson
First African-American woman to earn a Doctor of Medicine (MD) degree from Loma Linda University School of Medicine: Hughenna L. Gauntlett
First African-American woman to earn a Doctor of Medicine (MD) from Cornell University, Ithaca, New York: Marie Metoyer
First African-American woman physician to practice medicine in Midland, Texas: Viola Mary Johnson Coleman
First African-American prima ballerina hired by the Metropolitan Opera: Janet Collins
First African-American woman to graduate from University of Wisconsin-Madison Law School: Vel Phillips
First African American undergraduate to graduate from the University of Kentucky (UK) and from the University of Kentucky College of Engineering with an electrical engineering degree: Holloway Fields Jr.
First African-American to earn a graduate degree from the University of Delaware (Master’s Degree in Education): Kathryn Young Hazeur
First African American faculty member at Indiana University (percussion instructor): Richard Davis Johnson

- 1952

First African American to graduate from the University of Arkansas for Medical Sciences and the first African-American intern at an Arkansas hospital: Edith Irby Jones
First African-American woman elected (rather than appointed) to the Michigan state senate: Cora Brown
First tenured African-American professor in the entire University of California educational system and the first tenured African-American faculty member in a STEM field at a top-ranked, predominantly white university in the country (University of California at Berkeley): Joseph Thomas Gier
First African American appointed as a full-time member of the University of Michigan faculty: Albert Wheeler
First African-American resident of Philadelphia, Pennsylvania's Episcopal Hospital: Calvin C. Sampson
First African American to earn a degree at any level from Louisiana State University (LSU) (master's degree in education): Charles Edward Harrington
First African American to perform at Constitution Hall in Washington D.C.: Dorothy Maynor
First African American to graduate from the University of Maryland (master's degree in sociology): Parren Mitchell
First African-American woman to graduate from Case Western Reserve University Law School: Sara J. Harper

- 1953

First African-American woman physician on the faculty of the University of Louisville School of Medicine: Grace Marilynn James
First African-Americans to earn degrees at the University of Virginia : Louise Stokes Hunter and Walter N. Ridley
First African American man to earn a Doctor of Medicine (MD) from the University of Cincinnati College of Medicine: Emmett Campbell
First African American appointed to a staff of a Louisville, Kentucky hospital: Grace Marilynn James
First African American to earn a Doctor of Medicine (MD) from the University of Texas Medical School at Galveston: Herman A. Barnett
First African-American woman licensed attorney in the state of Texas: Charlye O. Farris
First African American undergraduate student at Louisiana State University (LSU): Alexander P. Tureaud Jr.
First African American graduate of the University of Texas School of Law: Virgil C. Lott

- 1954

First African-American woman to hold a cabinet position in New York City: Anna Arnold Hedgeman
First African-American woman to become a licensed architect in the state of New York: Norma Merrick Sklarek
First African American to receive a law degree from Louisiana State University in Baton Rouge: Ernest Nathan Morial
First African American elected president of the Queens (New York) Medical Society: John Edward Lowery
First African American to earn a degree from the University of Tennessee (graduated with a master's degree in special education: Lillian Jenkins
First African American to graduate from Vanderbilt University Divinity School (also the first African American to earn a doctorate from Vanderbilt, graduating in 1958): Joseph A. Johnson Jr.
First African-American woman to graduate from the University of Texas School of Law in Austin, Texas: Gloria Bradford

- 1955

First African-American woman elected to the New York State Legislature: Bessie A. Buchanan
First African-American elected to the Maryland State Senate: Harry A. Cole
First African-American artist to have a solo exhibition at the Delgado Museum (now the New Orleans Museum of Art): Clementine Hunter
First African-American woman to argue a case before the North Carolina Supreme Court: Elreta Alexander-Ralston
First African-American woman to earn a Ph.D. in mathematics education (University of Pittsburgh, Pittsburgh, Pennsylvania): Angie Turner King
First African Americans to earn a Doctor of Medicine (MD) degree from the University of Maryland School of Medicine: Roderick Edwards Charles and Donald Wallace Stewart
First African-American woman to earn a Doctor of Medicine (MD) from the Medical College of Virginia: Jean L. Harris
First three African-American undergraduates to enroll in the University of Arkansas (and all three completed a nursing degree program): Maxine Sutton, Billy Rose Whitfield, and Marjorie Wilkins
First African American to sing at the Metropolitan Opera in New York City: Robert McFerrin
First African-American librarian at the University of Kentucky: Eleanor Young Love
First African American to play a major role in the San Francisco Opera: Mattiwilda Dobbs
First African American to graduate from George Peabody College for Teachers (later Peabody College of Vanderbilt University), earning her Master of Library Science: Tommie Morton-Young
First African-American woman admitted to the Harris County Medical Society, which includes Houston, Texas: Thelma Patten Law
First African American woman elected to the New York State Supreme Court: Mary Johnson Lowe

- 1956

First African-American student to attend the University of Alabama: Autherine Lucy Her expulsion from the institution later that year led to the university's President Oliver Carmichael's resignation.
First African American to teach at college or university level in California: Betty Smith Williams.
First African-American woman to obtain a Master of Laws degree from Georgetown University Law Center: Mabel Dole Haden
First African-American woman on the engineering faculty at Tennessee A & I University: Yvonne Clark
First African-American physician to set up a practice in orthopedic surgery in California: Julius Wanser Hill
First African American to earn a Ph.D. from the Eastman School of Music, Rochester, New York: George Walker
First African American to graduate from Spring Hill College of Mobile, Alabama: Fannie E. Motley
First African American law firm established in Mobile, Alabama: Vernon Z. Crawford
First woman and the first African-American member of the Common Council in Milwaukee, Wisconsin, and given the title "Madam Alderman" by local officials: Vel Phillips
First African-American woman to enroll in and graduate from St. Mary's University School of Law in San Antonio, Texas, first African-American woman to practice law in Bexar County, Texas, and the only one for twenty-seven years, from 1956 to 1983: Hattie Elam Briscoe
First African American full-time faculty member at Penn State University (art education): Mary Godfrey
First African-American woman full professor at the Perelman School of Medicine at the University of Pennsylvania: Helen O. Dickens
First African American appointed judge in Missouri (22nd Judicial Circuit in St. Louis): Theodore McMillian
First African-American woman to earn a degree at University of Notre Dame, Indiana: Goldie Lee Ivory
First African-American woman admitted to the Louisiana bar: Mary Gloria Lawson
First African American professor at the University of Colorado Boulder: Charles Nilon
First African American to earn a Bachelor of Laws (LLB) degree from the University of Tennessee: R.B.J. Campbelle

- 1957

First African-American woman elected to the New Jersey Legislature: Madaline A. Williams
First African Americans to earn a Doctor of Medicine (MD) degree from the University of Virginia School of Medicine: Edward B. Nash and Edward T. Wood
First African-American orthopedic surgeon to practice in the state of Maryland: Elroy Young
First African American to earn a Doctor of Medicine degree from the University of Washington School of Medicine: Lloyd C. Elam
First African Americans to graduate from the University of Missouri: Walter Wesley Hamilton and Hubert Arthur Kelley
First African-American judge in Colorado (municipal court judge): James C. Flanigan
First African-American faculty member of the University of Notre Dame, Indiana: Adam Arnold
First African-American jazz band to perform at the Waldorf Astoria Hotel in New York City: Count Basie

- 1958

First African-American women elected to the Maryland General Assembly: Verda F. Welcome and Irma George Dixon
First African-American woman elected to the Illinois General Assembly: Floy Clements
First African-American woman to earn a Bachelor of Science in electrical engineering at the University of Michigan: Willie Hobbs Moore
First African-American woman to achieve a master's degree from the University of Minnesota in organic chemistry: Jeannette Brown
First African-American full professor at University of California, Berkeley: David Blackwell
First African-American surgeon in the state of Oklahoma to be certified by the American Board of Surgery: Charles A. Tollett
First African-American woman to earn a Doctor of Medicine degree from Saint Louis University School of Medicine: Maceola L. Cole
First African-American board-certified surgeon in Georgia: Asa G. Yancey Sr.
First African-American woman to graduate from the University of Missouri: Nora A. Petty
First African American to graduate from the University of Texas at Austin (earned a bachelor's degree in secondary education): Edna Oddessa Humphries Rhambo
First African American admitted to the University of Florida: George H. Starke Jr.
First African American woman to vote in Miami, Florida: Blanche Calloway
First African-American graduate of Virginia Tech: Charlie L. Yates

- 1959

First African-American woman to graduate from the University of Maryland: Elaine J. Coates
First African-American attorney in the state of Alaska: Mahala Ashley Dickerson
First African-American woman to serve as a judge in Pennsylvania: Juanita Kidd Stout
First African-American woman attorney to practice law in the state of Kentucky: Alberta Odell Jones
First African American to graduate from the University of Virginia, where he earned a Bachelor of Science in electrical engineering: Robert Arthur Bland
First tenured African-American professor at the University of Iowa: Philip G. Hubbard
First woman to be awarded an engineering degree by Prairie View A&M University and the first African-American woman to earn an engineering degree from any university in the state of Texas: Nathelyne A. Kennedy
First African-American woman to become a fellow of the American College of Surgeons: Dorothy Lavinia Brown
First African American to earn a Doctor of Medicine from George Washington University School of Medicine and Health Sciences: James Edwin Jackson
First African-American woman to earn a Doctor of Medicine (MD) from the University of Oklahoma College of Medicine: Vivian Moon Lewis
First African American to earn a bachelor's degree from the University of West Virginia: Jack Hodges
First African American playwright to win the New York Drama Critics' Circle award: Lorraine Hansberry
First African American to earn a doctorate degree from the University of Tennessee (Doctor of Education (Ed.D) in educational administration and supervision): Harry S. Blanton

=== 1960s ===
- 1960

First African-American woman to earn a doctorate in any subject at the University of Texas at Austin (mathematics education): Lillian K. Bradley
First African American to serve in the Alaska Legislature: Blanche L. McSmith
First African American elected to serve in the Missouri Senate: Theodore McNeal

- 1961

First African-American students to attend the University of Georgia: Charlayne Hunter and Hamilton E. Holmes
First African-American woman to graduate from the University of Pittsburgh's School of Engineering: Elayne Arrington
First African-American woman to earn a Master of Science in electrical engineering at the University of Michigan: Willie Hobbs Moore
First African American licensed to practice veterinary medicine in the state of Alabama: Raleigh H. Allen
First African American to earn a Doctor of Medicine from Stanford University School of Medicine: Augustus A. White
First African American to earn a bachelor's degree from the University of North Carolina at Chapel Hill: David M. Dansby Jr.
First African American confirmed as the United States Attorney for the Northern District of California and the first African American United States Attorney in the nation's history: Cecil F. Poole
First African Americans to enroll at Georgia Institute of Technology (Georgia Tech): Ford C. Greene, Ralph A. Long Jr., and Lawrence Williams
First African-American woman and first woman to earn a doctorate in library science from Columbia University: Annette Lewis Phinazee
First African American to attend the University of South Florida (USF): Ernest Boger
First African-American woman judge in the state of California: Vaino Spencer

- 1962

First African-American attorney general of Massachusetts: Edward Brooke. Also first African American to hold Massachusetts statewide office, and first African-American attorney general of any state.
First African-American woman to become a licensed architect in the state of California: Norma Merrick Sklarek
First woman and first African American to hold the position of West Virginia's mental health commissioner: Mildred Mitchell-Bateman
First African-American woman in Virginia to become a Certified Public Accountant (CPA): Ruth Coles Harris
First African American to teach in the department of psychology at the University of Kansas, serving as an assistant professor: C. Kermit Phelps
First African American to earn a Doctor of Medicine (MD) degree from Washington University School of Medicine, St. Louis, Missouri: James Leonard Sweatt, III
First African American and first woman in the United States hired to head a state department of mental health when she was appointed full-time director of the West Virginia Department of Mental Health: Mildred Mitchell-Bateman
First African American to graduate from the University of Florida (graduated from the University of Florida Levin College of Law): W. George Allen
First African American to enroll in the University of Mississippi (graduated in 1963): James Meredith
First African-American woman to serve in the Missouri state legislature: DeVerne Lee Calloway
First African-American woman to be elected to the Maryland Senate: Verda F. Welcome
First African-American student admitted to Georgia State College: Annette Lucille Hall
First African-American woman to earn a Ph.D. degree in mathematics education from New York University: Louise Nixon Sutton
First African-American woman to graduate from the Georgetown University Law Center: Norma Holloway Johnson
First African American librarian at the University of Colorado Boulder: Mildred Nilon
First African American to graduate from the University of Georgia (master's degree in music education): Mary Frances Early
First African-American woman to serve as a police officer in Florida (Miami-Dade Police Department): Thelma Gaitor Freeman Harris

- 1963

First African American student at Clemson University: Harvey Gantt
First African-American woman student and second African-American student at Clemson University: Lucinda Brawley Gantt
First African American undergraduates to graduate from the University of Georgia: Hamilton Holmes and Charlayne Hunter-Gault
First African American elected to the Los Angeles City Council: Tom Bradley
First African-American reporter for the Plain Dealer in Cleveland, Ohio: Robert G. McGruder
First African-American woman to attend the University of North Carolina at Chapel Hill as an undergraduate student: Karen L. Parker
First African American to attend the University of Mississippi School of Law: Cleve McDowell
First African-American woman to attend class at Tulane University: Deirdre Labat
First African American professor to earn tenure at Penn State University: Charles T. Davis
First African-American mayor in the state of Hawaii as the Chairman and Executive Officer of the County of Hawaii (a forerunner of the Mayor of Hawaiʻi County): Helene Hale

- 1964

First African American elected to the Delaware Senate: Herman Holloway
First African-American woman elected to the Indiana Legislature: Daisy Riley Lloyd
First African-American woman elected to the New York State Senate: Constance Baker Motley
First African-American woman to earn a contract with an American national symphony – with the Pittsburgh Symphony Orchestra as principal keyboardist: Patricia Prattis Jennings
First African-American full time faculty members at southern, traditionally white colleges: Wesley Lee Jordan (mathematics department at Belmont Abbey College in Belmont, North Carolina) and Ervin Perry (civil engineering department at University of Texas at Austin)
First African American to graduate from Florida State University's graduate program with a master's degree (social work from the School of Social Work): Maxine Thurston
First African American to earn a Doctor of Medicine (MD) from the University of Tennessee College of Medicine: Alvin H. Crawford
First African American to earn a Doctor of Medicine (MD) from the University of Kentucky: Carl Weber Watson
First African American to serve on the San Francisco Board of Supervisors: Terry Francois
First African American and first woman to serve in the Iowa House of Representatives: Willie Stevenson Glanton
First African Americans admitted to practice law in Nevada: Robert L. Reid and Earle W. White
First African-American student of Auburn University, Auburn, Alabama: Harold Franklin
First African-American woman to graduate from the Perelman School of Medicine, Philadelphia, Pennsylvania: Arlene Bennett
First African-American woman to enroll as an undergraduate at Louisiana State University (LSU): Freya Anderson Rivers
First African American to earn an undergraduate degree at the University of Tennessee, Knoxville: Brenda J. L. Peel
First African-American woman graduate of Arkansas State University: Ellen Strong
First African-American faculty member at St. Olaf College, Northfield, Minnesota: La Francis Rodger-Rose
First African American to graduate from the University of Tennessee at Martin: Beverly Park

- 1965

First African-American woman elected to public office in Colorado (Denver Public Schools Board of Education: Rachel B. Noel
First African American to graduate from the University of Alabama: Vivian Malone Jones
First African American to graduate from Clemson University, and third ranking student in the architecture program: Harvey Gantt
First African-American mathematics instructor at the Milwaukee Area Technical College: Gloria Ford Gilmer
First African American to graduate from Florida State University with a bachelor's degree (mathematics): Maxwell Courtney
First African American to earn a degree from Tarkio College (Missouri): Walter C. Gough
First African American to graduate from the University of Florida with an undergraduate degree: Stephan Mickle
First African American criminal court judge in a court of record in the state of Tennessee (Shelby County criminal court): Benjamin Hooks
First African American to graduate from the Arlington State College (ASC): Maxwell Scarlett
First African-American woman elected to the Georgia General Assembly: Grace Towns Hamilton
First African-American woman to be a full-time faculty member of the University of Delaware: Hilda Andrea Davis
First African-American woman to earn an undergraduate degree from University of North Carolina at Chapel Hill (Bachelor of Arts degree in journalism): Karen L. Parker
First African-American to serve on the Miami City Commission (Miami, Florida): M. Athalie Range
First African-American woman admitted to the Mississippi Bar: Marian Wright Edelman
First African American to earn a degree from Georgia Institute of Technology (Georgia Tech): Ronald Yancey (earned an electrical engineering degree)
First African American to serve on the Atlanta Board of Aldermen since Reconstruction, elected in 1965 and taking office in 1966: Q. V. Williamson
First African-American librarian to be accepted as a member of the Georgia Library Association: E. J. Josey
First African American trooper on the Missouri State Highway Patrol: David E. McPherson
First African American since the Reconstruction era and the first African-American woman to graduate from the University of South Carolina: Henrie Monteith Treadwell
First African-American woman and first woman Borough president of Manhattan: Constance Baker Motley
First African American faculty member at the University of Alaska: Robert London Smith
First woman of any race appointed prosecutor in the state of Kentucky (Louisville Domestic Relations Court): Alberta Odell Jones
First woman and first African-American woman to broadcast radio news in Chicago: Carole Simpson

- 1966

First African-American woman elected to the Texas Senate: Barbara Jordan
First African American known lesbian state legislator: Barbara Jordan
First African-American appointed to New York State Board of Regents: Kenneth Bancroft Clark
First African-American senator from Massachusetts: Edward Brooke. (Also first post-Reconstruction African American elected to the U.S. Senate and first African American elected to the U.S. Senate by popular vote)
First African-American woman in the California Legislature: Yvonne Brathwaite Burke
First African-American woman elected to the Tennessee General Assembly: Dorothy Lavinia Brown
First African-American woman elected to the Arizona Legislature: Ethel Maynard
Baltimore Police Department (BPD) first allowed African-American officers to use squad cars. Previously, they were restricted to foot patrols
First African-American woman to earn a contract with an American national symphony – with the Pittsburgh Symphony Orchestra as principal keyboardist, playing piano, harpsichord, organ and celesta: Patricia Prattis Jennings
First African-American woman on the Baylor University (Texas) faculty: Vivienne Malone-Mayes
First African-American woman to earn a Ph.D. in mathematics from the University of Texas at Austin: Vivienne Malone-Mayes
First African-American woman to earn a Ph.D. from the University of Georgia (mathematics): Shirley McBay
First African-American woman to teach mathematics at the University of Wisconsin–Milwaukee: Gloria Ford Gilmer
First African-American woman elected as an officer in a state labor organization when she was elected executive vice-president of the New Jersey Industrial Union Council: Mae Massie Eberhardt
First African American judge in Nevada: Robert L. Reid
First African-American deputy district attorney in Nevada: Addeliar D. Guy, III
First African-American member of the Birmingham Bar Association (Alabama): Oscar W. Adams
First African American (and first African-American woman) to graduate from Auburn University: Josetta Matthews
First African-American woman faculty member at the University of North Carolina at Chapel Hill: Hortense McClinton
First African American professor at Arizona State University: John Edwards
First woman and first African-American woman to chair the District of Columbia State Board of Education: Euphemia Haynes

- 1967

First African-American woman elected to the Baltimore City Council: Victorine Q. Adams
First African American elected to the Louisiana State Legislature since Reconstruction: Ernest Nathan Morial
First African-American woman graduate of the Loyola University New Orleans College of Law: Joan Bernard Armstrong
First African-American woman to complete a bachelor's degree at Vanderbilt University, Nashville, Tennessee: Dorothy J. Phillips
First African-American woman to be head of a Catholic hospital (St. Clare's Hospital in Baraboo, Wisconsin): Mary Antona Ebo
First African American to earn a Doctor of Medicine (MD) from Emory University School of Medicine (Georgia): Hamilton E. Holmes
First African American to earn a Doctor of Medicine (MD) from the Duke University School of Medicine (North Carolina): Delano Meriwether
First African-American woman to serve as associate dean of a major medical school (New York Medical College): Jane C. Wright
First African American to earn a Doctor of Medicine (MD) from Johns Hopkins University School of Medicine (Maryland): Robert Lee Gamble
First African American to earn a Doctor of Medicine (MD) from the University of Wisconsin: Walter James Tardy, Jr.
First African-American president of the Washington Orthopaedic Society: Charles H. Epps Jr.
First African American and first woman elected to the Kentucky Senate: Georgia Davis Powers
Believed to be the first African-American deputy public defender in Nevada: Earle W. White
First African American to earn a Ph.D. degree in Physical Biochemistry from Purdue University: William Moore
First African-American woman to serve on Wilmington, Delaware City Council: Hattie Phelan
First two African-American Ph.D. graduates at Duke University: Ida Stephens Owens and James Roland Law
First African-American full time professor at the University of Tennessee: Robert Kirk
First African-American faculty member at the University of Arizona: Vivian Cox
First African American woman to earn a Ph.D. degree from Louisiana State University (LSU): Pinkie Gordon Lane

- 1968

First African-American elected to the Florida Legislature since Reconstruction: Joe Lang Kershaw
First African-American woman elected as a district court judge in North Carolina: Elreta Alexander-Ralston
First African-American woman to earn a Doctor of Medicine from George Washington University School of Medicine and Health Sciences: Joan R. Sealy
First African American to earn a Doctor of Medicine (MD) degree from the University of California, Irvine, College of Medicine: John Richard Crear, Jr.
First two African-American women to earn a Doctor of Medicine (MD) degree from Case Western Reserve University School of Medicine (Ohio): Loma K. Flowers and Doris A. Evans
First African American to be the Poet Laureate of Illinois: Gwendolyn Brooks
First African American to serve as music director and conductor of the New Jersey Symphony (a major American orchestra): Henry Lewis
First African American television news reporter in Oregon (as well as in the Pacific Northwest: Dick Bogle
First African-American woman to serve in a state police force in the United States (Connecticut): Louise Smith
First African-American woman elected to a public office in Mississippi since the Reconstruction era (elected Election Commissioner in Canton, Mississippi): Flonzie Brown Wright
First African American in the 20th century to graduate from the University of South Carolina School of Law: I. S. Leevy Johnson
First African American to serve on the Birmingham, Alabama City Council: Arthur Shores
First African-American woman to earn a Master of Arts (M.A.) degree in dance from Texas Women's University: Ann Williams
First African-American woman and first woman to serve as United States Assistant Secretary of State (Assistant Secretary of State for Consular Affairs): Barbara M. Watson
First African American elected to the United States House of Representatives from the state of Missouri: Bill Clay
First African-American faculty member hired and the first to receive tenure at Florida State University (nursing): Tonya A. Harris
First African-American woman to earn a graduate degree at Vanderbilt University (Master of Arts in Teaching in History): Portia Poindexter
First woman to deliver the Class Day address at Harvard University: Coretta Scott King
First woman and first person of color to be elected to the Holmes County Board of Education Mississippi: Arenia Mallory
First African American and first woman member of the Philadelphia, Pennsylvania Planning Board: C. Delores Tucker
First Black instructor (in social sciences) at Georgia Institute of Technology (Georgia Tech): William Peace

- 1969

First African-American elected mayor of a Mississippi city since Reconstruction: Charles Evers, in Fayette, Mississippi
First African American state senator in Virginia since Reconstruction: Douglas Wilder
First African-American woman to become a full-time faculty member at the University of Kentucky when she joined the Department of Sociology: Doris Y. Wilkinson
First African American to earn a Doctor of Medicine (MD) degree from the University of Miami School of Medicine (Florida): George Sanders
First African-American associate dean for students at Yale University School of Medicine, New Haven, Connecticut: James P. Comer
First African-American associate dean for students at Howard University College of Medicine, Washington D.C.: Alvin Francis Poussaint
First African-American woman to head a department of psychiatry at an American medical school when she joined the faculty and headed the psychiatry department at Meharry Medical College (Tennessee): Jeanne Spurlock
First African-American physician tenured at the University of Nebraska Medical School: Melvin Earl Jenkins
First African-American woman professor at the Tulane University School of Medicine (Louisiana): Anna Epps
First African-American congressman elected in the state of Ohio: Louis Stokes
First African-American administrator for the University of Texas at Arlington: Reby Cary
First African American woman professor hired by the University of Arkansas: Margaret Louise Sirman Clark
First woman and first African-American television news anchor in Colorado, co-anchoring a newscast at KOA-TV (later renamed KCNC-TV) in Denver: Reynelda Muse
First African-American woman to earn a Master of Business Administration (MBA) at Harvard Business School: Lillian Lincoln
First African American to graduate from Southwestern University, Georgetown, Texas: Ernest Clark
First African-American woman to graduate from the University of Arkansas School of Law: Sharon Bernard
First African-American woman judge in the state of Georgia: Edith Jacqueline Ingram Grant

=== 1970s ===
- 1970

First African-Americans elected to the Alaska Legislature: Willard L. Bowman and Joshua Wright
First African-American woman elected to the Delaware General Assembly: Henrietta R. Johnson
First African-American woman elected to the Florida Legislature: Gwen Cherry
First African American elected as Juvenile Court judge in Louisiana: Ernest Nathan Morial
First African American to graduate with a medical degree from Vanderbilt University School of Medicine in Nashville, Tennessee: Levi Watkins
First African American to become superintendent of a large school district when appointed to the Oakland Unified School District in Oakland, California: Marcus Foster
First African American appointed State Commissioner for Health for the state of New Jersey: James Rankin Cowan
First African American to earn both a Doctor of Medicine (MD) and a doctorate (Ph.D.) from Case Western Reserve University (Ohio): David Satcher
The first two African Americans to earn a Doctor of Medicine (MD) degree from the University of Florida College of Medicine: Ruben Earl Brigety and Henry Earl Coteman
First African American to earn a Doctor of Medicine (MD) degree from Louisiana State University School of Medicine in New Orleans: Claude Jenkins Tellis
First two African Americans to earn a Doctor of Medicine (MD) degree from the University of Alabama School of Medicine: Richard Charles Dale and Samuel William Sullivan Jr.
First African American appointed to any San Francisco City commission: H. Welton Flynn
First African American becomes a cheerleader at the University of Texas at Arlington: Dickie Fears
First African American elected to any office in Oregon (Portland School Board): Gladys McCoy
First African-American woman graduate of the University of Mississippi School of Law: Constance Slaughter-Harvey
First African-American woman elected to the Washington Legislature: Peggy Maxie
First African-American woman to graduate from the University of Virginia School of Law: Elaine Jones
First African American faculty member of Arkansas State University: C. Calvin Smith
First African American to graduate from the University of the South, Sewanee, Tennessee: Nathaniel Owens
First African-American woman to graduate from the Vanderbilt University School of Nursing: Bobbi Perdue
First African-American woman licensed as an attorney in the state of Arkansas: Sharon Bernard
First African American and first woman to serve as director of the Detroit Public Library: Clara Stanton Jones
First African American faculty member at the University of Alabama: Archie Wade
First Black policewoman in the Oakland Police Department: Saundra Brown Armstrong

- 1971

First African-American woman to be elected to and serve in the Louisiana House of Representatives: Dorothy Mae Taylor
First African American to become chief resident of cardiac surgery at Johns Hopkins Hospital in Baltimore, Maryland: Levi Watkins
First woman judge in Milwaukee County and the first African-American judge in Wisconsin: Vel Phillips
First African American since Reconstruction and the first woman ever to head a state agency in Florida when appointed as Secretary of the Department of Community Affairs: M. Athalie Range
First African-American woman to earn a degree from University of Pittsburgh School of Law (Pitt Law): Martha Richards Conley
First African-American woman faculty member of Emory University and founding director of the first African-American and African-Studies degree-granting program in the South: Delores P. Aldridge
First two African Americans to earn a Doctor of Medicine (MD) degree from the Medical College of Georgia: John Harper and Frank Rumph
First African-American woman to earn a Doctor of Medicine (MD) degree from Jefferson Medical College (Pennsylvania): Cora LeEthel Christian
First African American and first woman judge in the state of Nebraska: Elizabeth Pittman
First African American elected to Congress from Maryland: Parren Mitchell
First African-American woman to serve on the Iowa State Board of Public Instruction: Virginia Harper
First tenured African-American professor at Harvard Divinity School: Preston Williams
First African American to play varsity football for the University of Alabama: John Mitchell Jr.
First African-American woman to earn a Ph.D. in mathematics from Louisiana State University: Dolores Richard Spikes
First African-American woman to earn a Ph.D. in biology from Tulane University: Joyce M. Verrett
First woman elected president of the New York Cancer Society: Jane C. Wright

- 1972

First African-American elected to the Wisconsin Senate: Monroe Swan
First African-American woman elected to the Colorado State House of Representatives: Arie Parks Taylor
First African Americans elected to the Selma City Council, Alabama since Reconstruction: Lorenzo Harrison Sr., Frederick D. Reese, Ernest Doyle, James Kimbrough and the Rev. William Kemp Sr.
First African-American woman associate professor at Georgetown University Law Center: Anita Martin
First woman to earn a master's degree in Engineering Management from Vanderbilt University, Nashville, Tennessee: Yvonne Clark
First African American to earn a Ph.D. from Clemson University, Clemson, South Carolina: James Edward Bostic Jr.
First African-American woman to earn a Doctor of Medicine (MD) degree from the University of Florida College of Medicine: Cassandra J. Ndiforchu
First African-American physician to serve as president of the Seattle Academy of Internal Medicine: Alvin J. Thompson
First African American news anchor in the New York City area (WNBC-TV): Carl Stokes
First African American elected to Congress from the state of Georgia since Reconstruction: Andrew Young
First African American to conduct the Metropolitan Opera orchestra of New York City: Henry Lewis
First African American elected to the Maine legislature: Gerald Talbot
First African-American woman from North Texas elected to public office (Texas House of Representatives): Eddie Bernice Johnson
First African-American woman elected to the Connecticut General Assembly: Margaret E. Morton
First African American professor in the Rudi E. Scheidt School of Music at the University of Memphis: G. James Gholson Jr.
First African American (and first African-American woman) faculty member at Auburn University (College of Liberal Arts as a French and history instructor): Josetta Matthews
First African-American woman to earn her doctorate degree in Human Development at the University of Chicago: E. Kitch Childs
First African-American woman to graduate from the University of Connecticut School of Law: Constance Belton Green
First African American appointed to the Missouri Court of Appeals-Eastern District: Theodore McMillian
First African-American woman to represent the West Coast in the U.S. House of Representatives and the first African-American woman from California elected to Congress: Yvonne Brathwaite Burke
First African American Assistant Attorney General of Alabama: Myron H. Thompson
First African-American woman to graduate from Duke University School of Medicine (Duke Med): Jean Spaulding
First African American to graduate from Georgia Institute of Technology (Georgia Tech) College of Architecture now known as the College of Design: William "Bill" Stanley
First African-American woman to earn a Ph.D. degree in physics at the University of Michigan (first in the U.S.): Willie Hobbs Moore

- 1973

First African-American woman elected to the Massachusetts General Court: Doris Bunte
First African-American woman elected to the Dallas City Council: Lucy Patterson
First African-American woman to earn a Doctor of Medicine (MD) degree from Washington University School of Medicine, St. Louis, Missouri: Karen LaFrance Scruggs
First two African Americans to earn a Doctor of Medicine (MD) degree from the University of Texas Southwestern Medical Center at Dallas, Texas: Charles Douglas Foutz and Johnny Lee Henry
First African Americans to earn a Doctor of Medicine (MD) degree from the Michigan State University College of Human Medicine: Janice Marie Fox, Judith Ann Ingram, Donald Gregory Weathers, and Roger O'Niel Whitmire
First African-American chief surgeon for the New York City Police Department: Clarence G. Robinson Jr.
First African-American woman to earn a Ph.D. in biophysics from the University of Illinois at Urbana–Champaign: Anna Coble
Fourth African-American woman in the U.S. Congress and the first to represent the state of Illinois and the Midwestern United States: Cardiss Collins
First African-American woman to head the public school system in a major city (District of Columbia Public Schools): Barbara Sizemore
First African-American woman appointed to a regular judgeship in Texas, and served on the City of Austin, Texas Municipal Court for twenty years: Harriet Mitchell Murphy
First African American to graduate from the University of California, San Diego School of Medicine (UCSD): Rodney Hood
First African-American women to graduate from Georgia Tech: Clemmie Whatley and Grace Hammonds
First African-American woman judge in Alabama: Faya Ora Rose Touré
First African-American woman to graduate from Dartmouth College in Hanover, New Hampshire: Lorna C. Hill

- 1974

First African-American woman elected to the Michigan State Board of Education: Barbara Roberts Mason
First African-American man elected to the New Hampshire House of Representatives: Henry Richardson
First African American elected to the Louisiana Fourth Circuit Court of Appeal: Ernest Nathan Morial
First African-American woman and first woman elected judge in Louisiana: Joan Bernard Armstrong
One of the first African Americans elected to the Alabama Senate since Reconstruction: U. W. Clemon
First African-American woman to earn a Doctor of Medicine (MD) degree from the University of Alabama School of Medicine: Patience Hodges Claybon
First African-American woman to earn a Doctor of Medicine (MD) degree from the University of Texas Southwestern Medical Center at Dallas, Texas: Kathryn Haley Flangin
First African Americans to earn a Doctor of Medicine (MD) degree from Penn State University College of Medicine: Janice C. McIntosh, James F. Byers, Theodore R. Densley, Wade A. Johnson, and Lewis E. Mitchell
First African American to earn a Doctor of Medicine (MD) degree from the University of Utah School of Medicine: William Anthony Robinson
First African American city commissioner in Portland, Oregon: Charles Jordan
First African-American woman elected to the Montana Legislature: Geraldine W. Travis
First African-American woman elected to the South Carolina Legislature: Juanita Goggins
First African-American woman to serve as a Newark, New Jersey Municipal Court Judge: Golden E. Johnson
First African-American woman to graduate from the Harvard School of Dental Medicine: Dolores Mercedes Franklin
First African American to earn the Doctor of Pharmacy degree at the University of Tennessee College of Pharmacy: James S. Hayes
First African-American woman educator at Arkansas State University: Adena Williams Loston
First African-American woman judge in Louisiana: Joan Armstrong
First African-American woman to earn a Ph.D. from Vanderbilt University (German): Eve Lee
First woman to serve as vice president of academic affairs at Howard University: Lorraine A. Williams

- 1975

First African-American woman in the state of California to receive a license to practice psychology: Gail E. Wyatt
First African-American women to earn a Doctor of Medicine degree from the University of Washington School of Medicine: Blanche Marie Chavers and Robin Eleanor Wragg
First two African-American women to earn a Doctor of Medicine (MD) degree from the Medical College of Georgia: Angelica Valencia Sims and Elizabeth Hawkins Woods
First two African-American women to earn a Doctor of Medicine (MD) degree from the University of Colorado School of Medicine: LaRae H. Washington and Deborah Green
First two African-American women to earn a Doctor of Medicine (MD) degree from the University of California at Davis School of Medicine: Sandra Dian Battis and Diane Loren Pemberton
First four African-Americans to earn a Doctor of Medicine (MD) degree from the State University of New York at Stony Brook: Janice C. Lark, Mitchelene J. Morgan, Paul J. Fox and Johnson B. Murray
First African American on the board of directors of the Metropolitan Opera: Dorothy Maynor
First African-American and the first woman public schools superintendent in Connecticut: Edythe J. Gaines
First African-American woman probation officer for the Massachusetts Probation Service: Denyse Bardouille
First African-American woman to graduate with a civil engineering degree from the University of Arkansas: Dinah Gail Gant
First two African-American women to earn a doctor of medicine degree from Indiana University School of Medicine: Deborah Lynne McCullough and Beverly J. Perkins
First woman professor at the MIT Sloan School of Management: Phyllis Ann Wallace
First woman and first African-American woman elected chair of the Howard University board of trustees: Geraldine Pittman Woods

- 1976

First African-American appointed as a judge in Federal District Court in Virginia: Robert H. Cooley III (1939–1998), appointed to the Eastern District
First African-American mayor in New Mexico: Albert Johnson
First African-American woman to be elected mayor in Mississippi (Mayersville): Unita Blackwell
First three African Americans to earn a Doctor of Medicine (MD) degree from Texas Tech University Health Sciences Center School of Medicine: Stella Pinkney Jones, Johnnie Paris Frazier and Charles Edward Mathis, III
First African American and first woman resident in neurosurgery at the University of Minnesota: Alexa Canady
First African-American woman chancellor of the University of Colorado at Boulder and the first African-American woman to head a major research university: Mary Frances Berry
First African American graduate of what is now the University of Arkansas at Little Rock William H. Bowen School of Law: Joyce Williams Warren
First woman, first African American, and first nurse to serve as deputy director of the National Institute for Mental Health (NIMH): Rhetaugh Graves Dumas
First African-American woman appointed as a judge in Mississippi: Constance Slaughter-Harvey
First African-American woman elected to the Illinois Senate: Earlean Collins
First African-American woman to receive a Doctor of Theology (ThD) from Harvard Divinity School: Rena Karefa-Smart
First African-American woman tenured across all units of Harvard University (Faculty of Arts and Sciences): Eileen Southern
First African-American woman to serve as Chairman of the Georgia State Board of Pardons and Paroles: Mamie B. Reese
First African-American woman to earn a Doctor of Medicine from the University of Iowa College of Medicine: Florence Battle Shafig
First African-American faculty member at University of Pittsburgh School of Law (Pitt Law): Robert Berkley Harper

- 1977

First African-American to serve on the California Supreme Court: Wiley W. Manuel
First African-American speaker of the Pennsylvania House of Representatives, and of any state legislature in the United States since Reconstruction: K. Leroy Irvis
First African-American woman elected to the Wisconsin Legislature: Marcia P. Coggs
First African American elected mayor of New Orleans: Ernest Nathan Morial
First African-American woman to work as an investigative reporter in Chicago: Renee Ferguson
First African-American woman judge in Massachusetts when appointed to be an associate justice of the Boston Municipal Court: Margaret Burnham
First African-American woman admitted to practice law in Delaware: Paulette Sullivan Moore
First African-American woman to graduate from University of Kentucky College of Engineering earning a degree in civil engineering: Ruth Coleman
First-known African-American member of the Daughters of the American Revolution when she joined the Ezra Parker chapter in Royal Oak, Michigan: Karen Batchelor
First African-American woman to graduate from Georgia Institute of Technology (Georgia Tech) College of Architecture now known as the College of Design: Ivenue Love-Stanley
First African-American woman elected to the Missouri State Senate: Gwen B. Giles
First African-American woman vice president of Continental Bank of Philadelphia (and first woman vice president of a major bank in Pennsylvania): Emma C. Chappell
First woman and first African-American woman to chair a major Texas house committee (Labor Committee): Eddie Bernice Johnson
First woman and first African-American woman to serve as a New York City Deputy Mayor: Lucille Mason Rose
First African-American woman elected to the Alabama House of Representatives: Louphenia Thomas
First African-American woman police officer in Asheville, North Carolina: Carolyn Logan

- 1978

First African-American appointed to the office of Michigan State Treasurer: Loren E. Monroe
First African-American woman elected to the Ohio Legislature: Helen Rankin
First African-American woman appointed as a judge in Maryland: Mabel Houze Hubbard
First African-American women to graduate with a medical degree from Vanderbilt University School of Medicine in Nashville, Tennessee: Darlene Dailey and Janis Adelaide Jones
First African-American physician to serve as president of the Washington State Medical Association: Alvin J. Thompson
First two African-American women to earn a Doctor of Medicine (MD) degree from the University of Massachusetts Medical School: Marcia Clair Bowling and Vernette Jones Bee
First African-American elected to a statewide office in Wisconsin: Vel Phillips, office of Secretary of State
First African-American pediatrician in Delaware: Patricia H. Purcell
First African-American woman tenured at University of California, Berkeley: Barbara Christian
First African-American woman trooper for the Missouri State Highway Patrol: Paula Woodruff
First African-American woman to earn a license in civil engineering in California: Lois Louise Cooper
First African American man to sing at Germany's Bayreuth Festival: Simon Lamont Estes
First African-American woman optometrist in the state of Mississippi: Linda D. Johnson

- 1979

First African-American elected to a statewide office in Illinois: Roland Burris, office of Comptroller
First African-American woman to earn a Ph.D. in electrical engineering at the University of California, Davis: Giovonnae Anderson
First African-American woman law professor at Georgetown University Law Center to be awarded tenure: Patricia A. King
First African-American president of the D.C. Medical Society: Charles H. Epps Jr.
First two African-American women to earn a Doctor of Medicine (MD) degree from the University of Utah School of Medicine: Denise L. Capel and Marjorie S. Coleman
First African American to serve as president of the American Cancer Society: LaSalle D. Leffall Jr.
First African American to be the Poet Laureate of Maryland: Lucille Clifton
First African-American woman to serve on the Iowa Board of Parole: Virginia Harper
First African American appointed as a judge at the United States District Court for the District of Massachusetts: David Sutherland Nelson
First African-American mayor of the city of Birmingham, Alabama: Richard Arrington Jr.
First African-American woman to chair a legislative committee in Maryland (Maryland House of Delegates Rules and Executive Nominations Committee): Hattie N. Harrison
First African-American woman to graduate from the University of Delaware with a Bachelor of Science degree in engineering (civil engineering: Velda Jones-Potter
First African-American woman and the first woman appointed as a judge of the United States District Court for the Southern District of Texas: Gabrielle Kirk McDonald
First African-American faculty member of Peabody College, Nashville, Tennessee: Bertha Holliday
First African-American woman certified as an assessor in the state of Michigan: Cassandra Elaine Smith-Gray
First African-American woman full professor at Ohio State University: Anne Pruitt-Logan

=== 1980s ===
- 1980

First African-American speaker of the California State Assembly: Willie Brown
First African-American woman to be elected as a circuit court judge in Michigan: Lucile A. Watts
First two African Americans to receive a Ph.D. in electrical engineering from Cornell University: Gary Lynn Harris and Michael G. Spencer
First African American selected to be president of the Medical College of Pennsylvania: Maurice C. Clifford
First African American becomes Homecoming Queen of the University of Texas at Arlington: Wanda Holiday
"First woman and the first African American to head a division of the Michigan Department of Natural Resources," when she became head of personnel: Margaret Sellers Walker
First African-American elected to the Wyoming Legislature: Harriet Elizabeth Byrd
First African-American women admitted to practice law in Nevada: Johnnie B. Rawlinson and Viveca Monet Woods
First African-American woman to serve on the Atlanta City Council: Carolyn Long Banks
First African-American woman and first woman elected to the bench in Durham County, North Carolina (District Court Judge): Karen Bethea-Shields
First African American to serve on any appellate court in the State of Alabama when appointed to the Alabama Supreme Court: Oscar W. Adams
First African-American woman to earn a doctorate in historical archaeology and African American history and culture from the University of Florida: Theresa A. Singleton
First African-American director of the Atlanta-Fulton Public Library System in Georgia: Ella Gaines Yates

- 1981

First African-American woman elected to the Arkansas General Assembly: Irma Hunter Brown
First African-American elected to the Utah Senate: Terry Lee Williams
First African American to serve as superintendent for the Chicago Public Schools district: Ruth B. Love
First African American appointed professor of orthopedic surgery at the University of Cincinnati College of Medicine: Alvin H. Crawford
First African American appointed director of the Michigan Department of Public Health: Bailus Walker Jr.
First African-American woman to earn a Doctor of Medicine (MD) degree from the Uniformed Services University of the Health Sciences (Maryland): Sabrina Ann Benjamin
First African Americans and first African-American women to earn a Doctor of Medicine (MD) degree from the East Carolina University School of Medicine: Natalear R. Collins and Brenda Mills Klutz
First poet laureate of Detroit, Michigan: Dudley Randall
First African American to be named dean of the University of Michigan School of Nursing: Rhetaugh Graves Dumas
First African-American woman to earn a PhD degree in astronomy (University of Maryland, College Park: Barbara A. Williams
First African-American woman optometrist to practice in the state of Alabama: Juanakee Adams
First African-American woman to earn a Ph.D. in computer science from Harvard University (at the time the degree was part of the applied mathematics program): Deborah Washington Brown
First African-American woman to earn a mechanical engineering degree from the University of Massachusetts Amherst: Cheryl Watkins Snead

- 1982

First African-American woman from Indiana elected to the U.S. House of Representatives: Katie Hall
First African American and first woman to complete a neurosurgery residency at Case Western University, Cleveland, Ohio: M. Deborrah Hyde
First African American to earn a Ph.D. in biological and agricultural engineering from North Carolina State University: Godfrey A. Gayle
First African-American woman to earn a Doctor of Medicine (MD) degree from Wright State University School of Medicine: Carol Jean Hubbard
First African American to graduate from the University of Missouri-Rolla (geological engineering): Denise Annette Ford
First African American to serve as the Baltimore, Maryland City Council President: Clarence H. Burns
First African-American mayor of Chicago, Illinois: Harold Washington
First African-American and first African-American woman to serve as speaker of the New York City Council: Adrienne Adams
First African-American woman judge in the state of Tennessee (Court of General Sessions in Shelby County): Bernice B. Donald
First African-American mayor of West Palm Beach, Florida: Eva Mack

- 1983

First African American to be elected president of the National Association of Women Lawyers: Mahala Ashley Dickerson
First African-American woman elected to the Greensboro City Council: Katie G. Dorsett
First African American trustee of the University of Georgia: Hamilton E. Holmes
First African Americans to earn a Doctor of Medicine (MD) degree from Northeastern Ohio University College of Medicine: Rochelle A. Broome, Margo Shamberger, Yvonne A. Patterson, and John D. Lewis
First African Americans to earn a Doctor of Medicine (MD) degree from University of Hawaiʻi at Mānoa: Lori Margaret Campbell and Paul Jeffrey Smith
First African American to earn a Doctor of Medicine (MD) degree from the East Tennessee State University James H. Quillen College of Medicine: Gregory Patterson
First African-American woman judge in the state of Arkansas when appointed as a juvenile court judge: Joyce Williams Warren
First African-American woman elected to the Cincinnati City Council: Marian Spencer
First African-American woman to be elected to the Virginia General Assembly: Yvonne B. Miller
First African American to be elected mayor of Charlotte, North Carolina: Harvey Gantt
First African-American woman judge in the state of Minnesota (when appointed to the Hennepin County Municipal Court): Pamela G. Alexander
First African-American woman to lead a major public transit agency (Washington Metropolitan Area Transit Authority): Carmen E. Turner

- 1984

First African-American elected to a statewide office in Georgia since Reconstruction: Robert Benham, Georgia Court of Appeals
First African American to be sworn in as the New York City Police Commissioner: Benjamin Ward
First African-American woman to hold a Louisiana cabinet position (head of the state Department of Urban and Community Affairs): Dorothy Mae Taylor
An African American was appointed as the first Poet Laureate of the District of Columbia: Sterling Allen Brown
First African-American woman elected to the Oregon Legislature: Margaret Carter
First African-American mayor of Philadelphia, Pennsylvania: Wilson Goode
First woman and first African-American president of the Chicago Teachers Union: Jacqueline B. Vaughn
First African-American woman judge on the Louisiana Court of Appeals: Joan Armstrong
First woman and first African-American woman president of Wilberforce University, Wilberforce, Ohio: Yvonne Walker-Taylor
First African-American woman to join the North Carolina State Highway Patrol: Carolyn Logan

- 1985

First African-American woman to be elected to the Mississippi Legislature: Alyce Clarke
First African-American woman appointed Administrator of the Boston Housing Authority: Doris Bunte
First African American to serve on the Mississippi Supreme Court: Reuben V. Anderson
First African-American president of the South Carolina Bar Association: I. S. Leevy Johnson
First African American to be elected the Lieutenant Governor of Virginia: Douglas Wilder
First African-American woman to earn a Ph.D. in mathematics at the Massachusetts Institute of Technology (MIT): Daphne L. Smith
First African-American woman to earn a Ph.D. in systematic theology at Union Theological Seminary: Jacquelyn Grant
First African-American woman appointed NYPD trial commissioner: Sandra M. Marsh

- 1986

First African-American women elected to the Oklahoma State Senate: Vicki Miles-LaGrange and Maxine Horner
First African-American woman elected as county commissioner in Payne County, Oklahoma: Bernice Mitchell
First woman and second African American to receive a Doctor of Musical Arts (DMA) from Yale University, New Haven, Connecticut: Kay George Roberts
First African-American student to earn a Ph.D. in applied economics from Clemson University: Gloria Bromell Tinubu
First woman and first African-American woman elected Speaker Pro Tempore of the Tennessee House of Representatives: Lois DeBerry
First African-American woman elected president of the Detroit Board of Education: Gloria C. Cobbin

- 1987

First African-American justice of the Connecticut Supreme Court: Robert D. Glass
First African-American woman to anchor a nightly newscast in Cleveland, and the first solo anchor of a weeknight newscast in that city: Romona Robinson
First African-American woman commissioner of the Los Angeles Board of Public Works: Myrlie Evers-Williams
First African-American mayor of Baltimore, Maryland: Clarence H. Burns
First African-American woman president of Spelman College, Atlanta, Georgia: Johnnetta Cole
First woman and first African-American woman appointed mayor of Little Rock, Arkansas (Pulaski County): Lottie Shackelford
First African-American woman elected to the Alabama State Board of Education: Ethel Harris Hall
First African-American woman firefighter in Omaha, Nebraska: Linda Brown
First woman appointed president of Lincoln University: Niara Sudarkasa
First woman and first African-American woman director of the Arkansas Department of Health: Joycelyn Elders
First woman, youngest person, and first African-American woman to serve as the commissioner of public health in the state of Massachusetts: Deborah Prothrow-Stith

- 1988

First African-American elected to the Wyoming Senate: Harriet Elizabeth Byrd
First African-American woman elected to the Vermont House of Representatives: Louvenia Bright
First African-American woman in the United States to serve on the Supreme Court of Pennsylvania: Juanita Kidd Stout
First African-American woman to earn a PhD at the University of Michigan in chemical engineering: Rosemarie Wesson
First African-American woman to earn a doctorate in electrical engineering at Rice University, Houston, Texas: Sandra Johnson
First African-American woman to become a superior court judge in Georgia: Leah Ward Sears
First African American Poet Laureate of Rhode Island: Michael S. Harper
First African-American woman to receive tenure at Yale University: Sylvia Ardyn Boone
First African-American woman to head the NYPD Civilian Complaint Review Board: Sandra M. Marsh

- 1989

First African American elected student body president of Texas A&M University: Ashanti Johnson
First African-American woman to earn a Ph.D. in Old Testament Studies from Princeton Theological Seminary: Renita J. Weems
First African American to be the Poet Laureate of Louisiana: Pinkie Gordon Lane
First African American to serve on the Supreme Court of Georgia: Robert Benham
First African American mayor of New York City: David Dinkins

=== 1990s ===
- 1990

First African-American governor of Virginia: Douglas Wilder (also first elected governor in U.S.; see also P. B. S. Pinchback, 1872)
First African-American woman elected to the Alaska Legislature: Bettye Davis
First African-American principal dancer for the Houston Ballet: Lauren Anderson
First African-American woman to earn a Ph.D. in electrical engineering from Georgia Institute of Technology (Georgia Tech): Janet C. Rutledge
First African American and first woman chief administrator of the flagship of the four campus Houston system when appointed president of the University of Houston: Marguerite Ross Barnett
First African-American woman attorney in the Howard County, Maryland office of the Public Defender: Alice Pollard Clark
First African-American woman and first woman mayor of the District of Columbia: Sharon Pratt
First African-American president of the New York City Board of Education: Gwendolyn Calvert Baker
First African-American woman elected president of the Oakland, California Board of Port Commissioners: Carole Ward Allen
First African American elected to a statewide office in Indiana (Clerk of the Indiana Supreme Court and Appellate Court): Dwayne Brown
First African-American woman elected to the United States Congress from Michigan: Barbara-Rose Collins
First African American to hold the position of chief medical resident at Brigham and Women's Hospital in Boston, Massachusetts: Paula Johnson
First African-American woman to earn tenure at Dartmouth College: Deborah K. King

- 1991

First African-American woman elected to the Louisiana State Senate: Diana Bajoie
First woman to serve as a California horse racing steward: Cheryl White
First African-American woman to earn a Ph.D. in electrical engineering from University of California at Berkeley: Valerie E. Taylor
First African American to earn a Doctor of Medicine (MD) degree from the University of Nevada School of Medicine: Carl Demardrian Virgil
First African-American woman appointed speaker pro tempore, the second highest position in the Texas House of Representatives: Wilhelmina Delco
First African American Speaker of the North Carolina House of Representatives: Dan Blue
First African-American woman to receive tenure at Grinnell College: Kesho Y. Scott
First African American and African-American woman elected mayor of Kansas City, Missouri: Emanuel Cleaver
First African-American woman judge in the State of Hawaii when appointed to the District Court of the First District of Hawaii: Sandra Simms
First woman and first African-American woman president of the Philadelphia Board of Education: Ruth Wright Hayre
First woman and first African-American woman president of Kentucky State University (KSU): Mary L. Smith
First African-American woman elected judge in the state of Kentucky: Janice R. Martin
First African-American woman mayor of Kalamazoo, Michigan: Beverly Moore

- 1992

First African-American elected as the Indiana Attorney General, and the second African-American elected to a statewide office in Indiana: Pamela Carter
First African-American Minnesota Supreme Court justice: Alan Page
First African American since the Reconstruction era elected to represent Florida in the United States Congress: Carrie Meek
First African Americans to win election to the United States House of Representatives from North Carolina since 1898: Eva Clayton and Mel Watt
First African-American woman to receive a bachelor's degree in physics from the University of Virginia: Marta Dark McNeese
First African American elected to the Louisiana Public Service Commission (PSC): Irma Muse Dixon
First African American woman to hold a North Carolina Cabinet post when appointed Secretary of the Department of Administration: Katie G. Dorsett
First African American elected to a statewide executive office in North Carolina (State Auditor): Ralph Campbell Jr.
First African-American woman to serve on the Ohio Supreme Court: Sara J. Harper
First African-American woman to serve as an appellate court judge in Texas: Gaynelle Griffin Jones
First African American and first woman selected for the board of the Greater New York Savings Bank: Gwendolyn Calvert Baker
First woman and first African-American woman to head the Chicago Dental Society: Juliann Bluitt Foster
First woman, first African-American woman, and the youngest person to serve on the Georgia Supreme Court: Leah Ward Sears
First African-American woman elected to the U.S. Congress from Georgia: Cynthia McKinney
First African-American woman sheriff in the United States when elected in Fulton County, Georgia: Jacquelyn Barrett

- 1993

First African-American senator from Illinois: Carol Moseley Braun. (Also first African-American woman elected to the United States Senate, the first African-American U.S. Senator for the Democratic Party, the first woman to defeat an incumbent U.S. Senator in an election, and the first woman Senator from Illinois).
First African-American woman elected to the Selma City Council, Alabama: Nancy Sewell
First African American to be the Portland, Oregon police chief: Charles Moose
First African-American woman to be appointed to one of the Florida District Courts of Appeal (Second District Court of Appeal): Peggy Quince
First African American woman elected as district attorney in Rockingham County and in the state of North Carolina: Belinda J. Foster
First African American appointed to the Colorado Supreme Court: Gregory K. Scott
First woman, first African American, and youngest provost in Stanford University's history: Condoleezza Rice
First African-American woman to earn a doctorate in industrial engineering in Oklahoma (University of Oklahoma): Pamela McCauley
First woman (and African American woman) to serve as the United States Attorney for the Southern District of Texas: Gaynelle Griffin Jones
First woman and first African-American woman to serve as the United States Attorney for the Western District of Oklahoma: Vicki Miles-LaGrange
First African American elected mayor of St. Louis, Missouri: Freeman Bosley Jr.
First African-American woman president of the Detroit, Michigan Bar Association: Denise Page Hood
First African American (and first African-American woman) to head the NYPD's Office of Equal Employment Opportunity (OEEO): Sandra M. Marsh
First African-American woman elected to the Alabama Senate: Sundra Escott-Russell
First woman and first African-American woman to become president of Texas Southern University: Joann Horton

- 1994

First African-American woman elected to the Nevada Legislature: Bernice Mathews
First African-American woman elected to the Delaware Senate: Margaret Rose Henry
First African-American woman to serve as a Colorado state senator: Gloria Tanner
First African-American woman from Alabama to earn a Ph.D. degree in physics (Alabama A&M University): Shelia Nash-Stevenson
First African-American woman to be the chief of the Atlanta Police Department (also first chief of police of any major city in the United States): Beverly Harvard
First African-American woman promoted into the Texas Department of Public Safety’s Texas Rangers Division: Christine Nix
First African-American and first woman superintendent of the San Diego Unified School District: Bertha Pendleton
First African-American woman to serve as an Associate Justice for the Supreme Court of Louisiana: Bernette Joshua Johnson
First African-American woman captain of the New York City Police Department (NYPD): Joyce A. Stephen
First African-American woman judge in the entire Rocky Mountain region (Colorado): Claudia J. Jordan
First woman and first African-American woman president of Johnson C. Smith University: Dorothy Cowser Yancy

- 1995

First African American selected to be president of the Dallas County Medical Society, Texas: James Leonard Sweatt, III
First African American and first woman appointed to the Indiana Supreme Court: Myra C. Selby
First African-American woman and the second woman to serve on the Arkansas Supreme Court: Andree Layton Roaf
First African-American woman to chair the Georgia Board of Regents: Juanita Baranco
First African American to serve as Chief Justice on the Supreme Court of Georgia: Robert Benham
First African-American woman appointed Commissioner of Public Health in Philadelphia, Pennsylvania: Estelle Richman
First woman and first African-American woman Brigadier general in New York state when she became the National Guard assistant adjutant general: Rosetta Burke
First woman and first African-American woman president of Knoxville College: Lois Stovall Williams

- 1996

First African-American woman elected to the Oregon State Senate: Avel Gordly
First African American to serve as mayor of San Francisco, California: Willie Brown
First African-American woman and first woman president of Buffalo State College: Muriel A. Howard
First African-American woman to serve on the California Supreme Court: Janice Rogers Brown

- 1997

First African American and the first woman appointed and later elected Columbus, Ohio City Attorney: Janet E. Jackson
First African-American woman and first woman to serve as district attorney for Contra Costa County, California: Diana Becton
First African-American woman to serve as district judge for Howard County, Maryland: Alice Pollard Clark
First African American to serve on the Massachusetts Supreme Judicial Court: Roderick L. Ireland
First African American hired in a tenure-track position in undergraduate college of University of the South, Sewanee, Tennessee: Houston Bryan Roberson
First African-American woman to earn a Ph.D. in toxicology from Massachusetts Institute of Technology (MIT): LaCreis Kidd
First woman and first African-American woman elected comptroller of St. Louis, Missouri: Darlene Green
First African-American woman to serve as president of a four-year college in Virginia (Norfolk State University): Marie McDemmond
First woman and first African-American woman National Basketball Association (NBA) referee: Violet Palmer

- 1998

First African-American woman elected State Treasurer and first African-American woman elected statewide in Connecticut: Denise Nappier
First African-American elected to office of Attorney General of Georgia (named to fill unexpired term in 1997): Thurbert E. Baker
First African-American woman to earn a Ph.D. in Astronomy from the University of Michigan: Beth A. Brown
First African American to serve as a mayor on the Eastern Shore of Maryland and to be elected to any countywide office in Worcester County, Maryland (Orphan’s Court Judge): Fannie Birckhead
First woman and the first African American to be appointed as Chief Justice for Administration and Management for the Massachusetts Trial Court: Barbara A. Dortch-Okara
First African-American woman to earn a Ph.D. in electrical engineering from Polytechnic University and Principal Technical Patent Architect at NVIDIA: Ruthie D. Lyle
First African American woman and first woman to become a San Francisco cable car gripwoman: Fannie Mae Barnes
First African American to serve as president of Marygrove College, Detroit, Michigan: Glenda Price
First African-American state senator in West Virginia: Marie Redd
First African-American woman to serve as a tenured Harvard Law School professor: Lani Guinier
First African-American woman to become a tenured professor at Johns Hopkins University: Fannie Gaston-Johansson
First woman and first African-American woman president of Philander Smith College: Trudie Kibbe Reed
First woman and the first African-American president of the Fashion Institute of Technology: Joyce F. Brown

- 1999

First African-American woman justice of the Supreme Court of Florida: Peggy Quince
First African American to earn a doctoral degree in oceanography from Texas A&M University: Ashanti Johnson
First African-American woman to earn her Ph.D. in astronomy at University of Washington: Dara Norman
First African-American woman to serve on the Georgia Court of Appeals: M. Yvette Miller
First African-American woman to earn tenure at the University of Chicago Law School: Tracey Meares
First woman and first African-American woman president of St. Augustine's College: Dianne Boardley Suber

== 21st century ==
=== 2000s ===
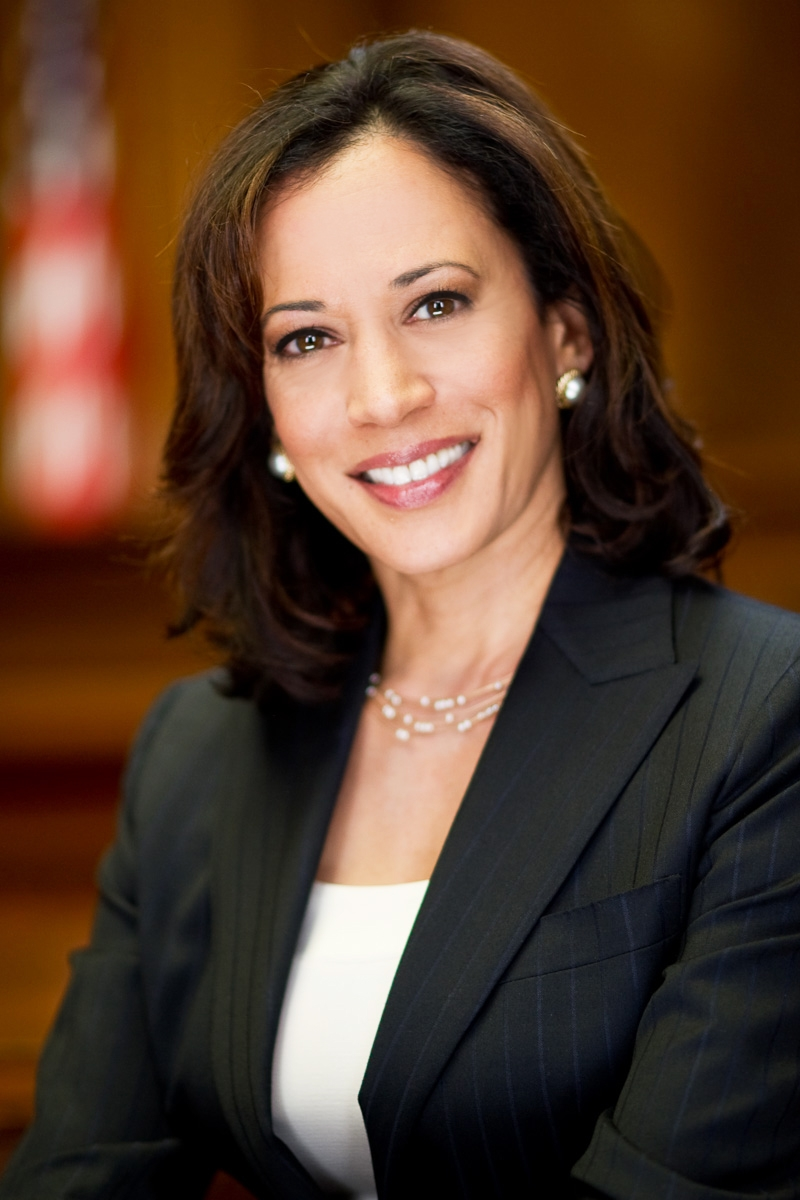
Official portrait of Kamala Harris, 2011

- 2001

First African-American woman elected to the Minnesota Legislature: Neva Walker
First African-American woman in the Missouri Air National Guard to be promoted to Brigadier general: Edith Mitchell
First African American elected mayor pro tem of Greensboro: Yvonne Johnson
First African-American woman and second person to be selected poet laureate of Detroit, Michigan: Naomi Long Madgett
First African American Poet Laureate of Connecticut: Marilyn Nelson
First African American to earn a Ph.D. degree in applied mathematics from the University of Colorado Boulder: Rudy Horne
First African-American member of the Texas Supreme Court: Wallace B. Jefferson (See also 2004)
First woman and first African-American woman to serve as a permanent department chair at the University of Pittsburgh (department of family medicine): Jeannette South-Paul
First African-American woman elected mayor of Tchula, Mississippi; first African-American Republican woman elected mayor in the state of Mississippi: Yvonne Brown
First woman and first African-American woman president of Livingstone College in Salisbury, North Carolina: Algeania Freeman
First woman and first African-American woman president of Fisk University in Nashville, Tennessee: Carolynn Reid-Wallace

- 2002

First African-American lieutenant governor of Maryland and first elected to statewide office in Maryland: Michael Steele (see also: 2009)
First African-American woman president of a State Medical Society in the United States (President of the Medical Association State of Alabama): Regina Benjamin
First African American appointed as Poet Laureate of New Jersey: Amiri Baraka
First African-American chief of the San Francisco Police Department: Prentice Earl Sanders
First African-American woman appointed to the Nevada state justice system (Las Vegas justice court): Karen Bennett-Haron
First African-American woman and the first woman elected mayor of Atlanta, Georgia and the first African-American woman to be elected mayor of a major Southern city: Shirley Franklin
First African American elected president of the Alabama State Bar association: Fred Gray

- 2003

First African-American woman to be crowned Miss Florida in the Miss America pageant's 81-year history: Ericka Dunlap
First African-American woman to serve as judge on the Jefferson County, Alabama Circuit Court: Helen Shores Lee

- 2004

First African-American and first woman District Attorney in California: Kamala Harris (San Francisco) (see also: 2010, 2017)
First African-American Oklahoma Supreme Court justice: Tom Colbert
First African-American Wisconsin Supreme Court justice: Louis B. Butler
First African-American Auditor of Accounts of Vermont and first elected to statewide office in Vermont: Randy Brock
First African-American congresswoman elected in Wisconsin's history: Gwen Moore
First African-American judge appointed to the Nevada Supreme Court: Michael L. Douglas
First African American head football coach in the Southeastern Conference (SEC): Sylvester Croom Jr.
First African-American named Chief Justice of the Texas Supreme Court: Wallace B. Jefferson (See also 2001)
First African-American woman to serve as Minority Leader in the Missouri Senate: Maida Coleman
First woman and first African-American woman elected to a Louisiana senate leadership post as Senate Pro Tempore: Diana Bajoie:

- 2005

First African-American woman chief justice of a state supreme court in the United States when she became Chief Justice of the Supreme Court of Georgia: Leah Ward Sears
First African-American woman to earn a Ph.D. degree in computer science from North Carolina State University: Alicia Nicki Washington

- 2006

First African-American elected governor of Massachusetts: Deval Patrick
First African-American lieutenant governor of New York: David Paterson
First African-American woman to graduate with a PhD in physics from Johns Hopkins University in Baltimore, Maryland: Jami Valentine
First African-American woman to serve on the North Carolina Supreme Court: Patricia Timmons-Goodson
First African American to serve in the Cabinet of the State of Utah when appointed to the chair of the Utah Board of Pardons and Parole: Keith N. Hamilton
First African-American woman to earn a PhD in New Testament from Harvard University: Mitzi J. Smith
First African American to be elected district attorney in Dallas County, Texas: Craig Watkins

- 2007

First African-American appointed State Treasurer of New Jersey: Michellene Davis
First African American elected mayor of Greensboro: Yvonne Johnson
First African American elected mayor of Wichita, Kansas: Carl Brewer
First African-American woman to earn tenure at Yale Law School: Tracey Meares
First African-American woman to serve as vice provost and dean of the University of Tennessee graduate school: Carolyn Hodges
First African-American woman and first woman to serve as a District Attorney in Louisiana: Keva Landrum-Johnson
First African-American woman on the Kentucky Court of Appeals: Denise G. Clayton
First woman and first African-American woman to serve as chief executive officer and chief academic officer of Concordia College of Selma, Alabama: Portia Holmes Shields

- 2008

First African-American woman elected Speaker of the California State Assembly: Karen Bass
First African-American governor of New York State: David Paterson (elected as lieutenant governor, succeeded on resignation of previous governor)
First African-American women elected to the Nebraska Legislature: Tanya Cook and Brenda Council
First African-American woman to head any branch of Florida government when she assumed the office of Chief Justice of the Supreme Court of Florida: Peggy Quince
First African-American woman elected to the Kansas Senate: Oletha Faust-Goudeau
First African-American woman to be elected president of the American Academy of Religion (AAR): Emilie Townes
First African American appointed Madison, Wisconsin poet laureate: Fabu Carter
First African-American woman to earn her PhD in Biomedical Physics at University of California, Los Angeles (UCLA): Julianne Pollard-Larkin
First African American crowned Miss South Dakota: Charlie Buhler
First African American and the first woman appointed to the post of Dean of Harvard College: Evelynn M. Hammonds

- 2009

First bicameral state legislature to have both chambers headed simultaneously by African Americans: Peter Groff and Terrance Carroll of Colorado
First African-American woman elected to the Boston City Council: Ayanna Pressley
First African American appointed to serve as a United States Attorney for the Southern District of Alabama: Kenyen R. Brown
First African-American woman dean of Columbia College, Columbia University: Michele Moody-Adams
First African American and first African-American woman dean of the University of Maryland Law School: Phoebe Haddon
First African-American woman to serve as the President of the Louisiana State Bar Association: Kim M. Boyle
First woman and first African-American woman mayor of Birmingham, Alabama (appointed, not elected): Carole Smitherman

=== 2010s ===
- 2010

First African-American elected Attorney General of California: Kamala Harris (see also: 2004, 2017)
First African-American Chief Justice of the Massachusetts Supreme Judicial Court: Roderick L. Ireland
First African-American elected to the Idaho Legislature: Cherie Buckner-Webb
First African-American woman elected to Congress from Alabama: Terri Sewell
First African-American woman elected from District 42 representing Aurora, Colorado to the Colorado State House of Representatives as well as the first Speaker pro Tempore: Rhonda Fields
First African-American woman to be attorney general in New Jersey: Paula Dow
First African-American woman elected mayor of Tacoma, Washington: Marilyn Strickland
First African-American woman to earn a PhD degree in nuclear engineering at the University of Illinois Urbana-Champaign: J'Tia Hart
First African-American woman to earn a Ph.D. in astrophysics at the University of California, Berkeley: Nia Imara
First African-American woman to serve on the Maryland Court of Special Appeals: Michele D. Hotten
First American-American woman judge in Alaska: Pamela Scott Washington

- 2011

First African-American woman to earn tenure in the College of Engineering at Purdue University: Monica Cox
First African-American woman to serve as a justice on the Ohio Supreme Court: Yvette McGee Brown

- 2012

First African-American elected to the Idaho Senate: Cherie Buckner-Webb
Second African-American woman and the fourth African American to earn a doctoral degree in physics from The University of Alabama at Birmingham: Hadiyah-Nicole Green
First African-American woman to serve as a Jefferson County, Alabama municipal and circuit court judge: Carole Smitherman
First person to serve simultaneously as a state poet laureate (Poet Laureate of Mississippi and the U.S. Poet Laureate: Natasha Trethewey
First African-American woman and first woman to lead a conference in the New York State Legislature: Andrea Stewart-Cousins
First African-American woman to earn a Ph.D. in nuclear engineering from University of Tennessee: Jamie Porter
First African American to graduate from Vanderbilt University with a Ph.D. in Human Genetics: Janina Jeff
First Poet Laureate of Philadelphia, Pennsylvania: Sonia Sanchez
First African American and first woman elected as Los Angeles County District Attorney: Jackie Lacey
First African-American woman to serve on the Minnesota Supreme Court: Wilhelmina Wright
First African American (and first African-American woman) mayor of High Point, North Carolina: Bernita Sims

- 2013

First African-American senator from South Carolina: Tim Scott (Also the first African-American to serve both houses of the U.S. Congress.)
First African-American woman to be appointed to a seat on the New York Court of Appeals: Sheila Abdus-Salaam.
First African-American senator from New Jersey: Cory Booker
First African-American woman to serve as Chief Deputy Attorney General for the Commonwealth of Virginia: Cynthia Eppes Hudson
First African-American woman to serve as a judge on the Maryland Court of Appeals, the state's highest court: Shirley M. Watts
First African American to serve as the chief justice of the Louisiana Supreme Court: Bernette Joshua Johnson
First African American dean at Vanderbilt Divinity School: Emilie Townes
First African-American woman to serve as a Justice of the Massachusetts Appeals Court: Geraldine Hines
First African American and first woman president of York College of Pennsylvania: Pamela Gunter-Smith
First African-American woman mayor of Broward County, Florida: Barbara Sharief

- 2014

First African-American senator elected from the South since Reconstruction: Tim Scott
First African-American woman to represent New Jersey in the U.S. House of Representatives: Bonnie Watson Coleman
First African-American woman to be elected to the Illinois House of Representatives 103rd district: Carol Ammons
First woman and the first African American to lead Trinity College (Connecticut): Joanne Berger-Sweeney
First African-American woman to be named the John H. Harland dean of Emory University's Goizueta Business School: Erika H. James
First African-American woman to complete her PhD in astrophysics at Yale University: Jedidah Isler
First African-American woman to serve as an associate justice of the Massachusetts Supreme Judicial Court: Geraldine Hines
First African-American woman to serve as mayor of Teaneck, New Jersey, as well as the first African-American woman to serve as the mayor of any municipality in Bergen County, New Jersey, the state's most populous county: Lizette Parker
First African-American woman to complete her PhD in astrophysics at Yale University: Jedidah Isler
First African American woman to become a district attorney in Texas: Erleigh Norville Wiley

- 2015

First African-American elected Speaker of the New York State Assembly: Carl Heastie
First African-American Lieutenant Governor of Kentucky and first elected to statewide office in Kentucky: Jenean Hampton
First African-American woman elected to the Utah Legislature: Sandra Hollins
First African-American woman from Redstone Arsenal, Alabama, selected for the government's Senior Executive Service (SES): Juanita Christensen
First African Americans to own a cannabis dispensary and an edibles business in Colorado: Wanda James and Scott Durrah
First African Americans and first twin siblings to be co-Poet Laureate of Delaware: Nnamdi Chukwuocha and Al Mills
First African-American woman to be elected mayor of Toledo, Ohio: Paula Hicks-Hudson
First African American president of Swarthmore College, Swarthmore, Pennsylvania: Valerie Smith
First African-American woman elected as a District Attorney in Louisiana: Bridget A. Dinvaut
First woman to be elected Bronx County District Attorney and the first African-American woman to be elected as a District Attorney in the State of New York: Darcel Clark

- 2016

First African-American woman to serve as superintendent of the Los Angeles Unified School District (LAUSD), the second-largest school district in the United States: Michelle King
First African American to serve as president of Wellesley College: Paula Johnson
First African-American woman elected to the Maine Legislature: Rachel Talbot Ross
First African-American woman to serve as the Wilmington, Delaware City Treasurer: Velda Jones-Potter
First African-American woman to serve as president of the Wilmington, Delaware City Council: Hanifa Shabazz
First African-American woman to graduate with a PhD in physics from the Louisiana State University: Michelle Lollie
First African-American woman elected District Attorney in the State of Alabama: Lynneice Washington
First African-American woman elected sheriff in the state of Texas (Jefferson County): Zena Stephens

- 2017

First African-American United States Senator from California: Kamala Harris (see also: 2004, 2010)
First African-American elected lieutenant governor of New Jersey: Sheila Oliver
First African-American out trans woman to be elected to public office in the United States: Andrea Jenkins
First African-American woman to serve as district attorney in the Commonwealth of Pennsylvania: Kelley B. Hodge
First African-American woman to earn a Ph.D. in biomedical sciences from Florida State University: Lataisia Jones
First African-American woman to be a popularly elected mayor in Massachusetts when inaugurated as mayor of Framingham, Massachusetts: Yvonne M. Spicer
First woman and first African-American woman president of Prairie View A&M University: Ruth Simmons

- 2018

First African-American woman major-party candidate for governor (Georgia): Stacey Abrams
First African-American elected Lieutenant Governor of Michigan: Garlin Gilchrist
First African-American Attorney General of New York: Letitia James
First African American elected Lieutenant Governor of Illinois: Juliana Stratton
First African-American woman elected to represent Connecticut in Congress: Jahana Hayes
First African-American woman elected to Congress from Massachusetts: Ayanna Pressley
First African American to be appointed North Carolina Poet Laureate: Jaki Shelton Green
First African American official Indiana State Poet Laureate: Adrian Matejka
First African-American woman mayor of San Francisco, California: London Breed
First African-American woman to earn a Ph.D. in nuclear engineering from Massachusetts Institute of Technology (MIT): Mareena Robinson Snowden
First African-American woman to earn a Ph.D. in nuclear engineering from University of Michigan: Ciara Sivels
First African-American woman elected sheriff in North Carolina (Pitt County): Paula Dance

- 2019

First African-American elected Attorney General of Kentucky: Daniel Cameron
First Surgeon General for the State of California: Nadine Burke Harris
First African-American woman elected to be chair of the Michigan Democratic Party: Lavora Barnes
First African-American woman to serve as director of the Illinois Department of Public Health (IDPH) in its 143-year history: Ngozi Ezike
First African-American woman to serve as chief justice of the North Carolina Supreme Court: Cheri Beasley
First African-American Woman elected as a Portland City Commissioner, Portland, Oregon: Jo Ann Hardesty
First African-American woman to earn a Ph.D. in computer science at Cornell University: Rediet Abebe
First African-American woman and first woman elected Majority Leader of the New York State Senate: Andrea Stewart-Cousins
First African-American and first woman elected Speaker of the Maryland House of Delegates: Adrienne A. Jones
First African American and Native American woman to serve as a judge of the United States District Court for the Northern District of Texas: Ada E. Brown

=== 2020s ===
- 2020

First African-American congresswoman elected in Missouri's history: Cori Bush
First African-American elected Lieutenant Governor of North Carolina: Mark Robinson
First African-American woman and first woman to be named dean of the Wharton School of the University of Pennsylvania: Erika H. James
First African-American woman to serve on the Raleigh City Council: Stormie Forte
First African-American Chief Justice of the Massachusetts Supreme Judicial Court: Kimberly S. Budd
First African-American woman to earn a Ph.D. in computer science from the University of Florida:Jasmine Bowers
First African American in a legislative leadership position in Maine when elected as House assistant majority leader: Rachel Talbot Ross
First African-American woman to serve on the New Jersey Supreme Court: Fabiana Pierre-Louis
First African-American woman to serve on the Wisconsin Court of Appeals: Maxine Aldridge White

- 2021

First African-American senator from Georgia and first African-American Democratic Senator from the South: Raphael Warnock
First African-American woman to serve on the Supreme Court of Missouri: Robin Ransom
First African-American woman elected Lieutenant Governor of Virginia: Winsome Sears
First African-American woman to serve as Secretary of the State of Connecticut: Natalie Braswell
First African-American woman to serve as United States federal judge for the Northern District of Mississippi: Debra M. Brown
First African American to be Poet Laureate of Kentucky: Crystal Wilkinson
First African-American woman to serve as the New York state acting Lieutenant Governor: Andrea Stewart-Cousins
First African American and first woman to serve as acting mayor of Boston: Kim Janey (upon the resignation of Marty Walsh to take the position of United States Secretary of Labor in the Cabinet of Joe Biden)
First African-American woman to earn a Ph.D. in Computer Science and Engineering from the University of South Florida: Shamaria Engram
First African-American woman to be elected mayor of St. Louis, Missouri: Tishaura Jones
First African-American president of Louisiana State University (LSU) and the first African-American president in the Southeastern Conference (SEC): William F. Tate IV
First African-American woman elected sheriff in Louisiana (Orleans Parish): Susan Hutson

- 2022

First African-American elected Attorney General of Maryland: Anthony Brown
First African-American woman elected Attorney General of Massachusetts: Andrea Campbell
First African-American elected Lieutenant Governor of Pennsylvania: Austin Davis
First African-American congresswoman elected in Pennsylvania's history: Summer Lee
First African-American elected governor of Maryland: Wes Moore
First African-American elected Speaker of the Michigan House of Representatives: Joe Tate
First African-American woman elected Secretary of State of Connecticut: Stephanie Thomas
First African-American elected Secretary of State of California: Shirley Weber
First African-American woman elected to an executive office in Delaware (the Delaware Auditor of Accounts): Lydia York
First African American named Poet Laureate of Alabama (also youngest person to hold this position): Ashley M. Jones
First African American to be appointed to the Illinois Supreme Court: Lisa Holder White
First African-American general manager in the National Hockey League (NHL): Mike Grier
First African-American woman promoted to captain of the Little Rock, Arkansas Fire Department: Quatecia Wilson
First African-American woman to serve as chief of the Arcola, Texas Police Department: Arika Carr
First African American to earn a graduate degree in marine science from the University of North Carolina at Chapel Hill: Aliyah Griffith
First African-American president of Harvard University: Claudine Gay
First woman and third Black person to serve as the New York City Police Commissioner: Keechant Sewell
First African American speaker of the New York City Council: Adrienne Adams
First African American and the first woman of color to serve as head of the White House Office of Science and Technology Policy (acting director): Alondra Nelson

- 2023

First African-American woman elected Speaker of the Pennsylvania House of Representatives: Joanna McClinton
First African-American woman to serve as the Secretary of the State of Connecticut: Stephanie Thomas
First African-American Poet Laureate of Michigan: Nandi Comer
First African-American woman named the Maryland Department of Public Safety and Correctional Services (DPSCS) Secretary: Carolyn Scruggs
First African-American woman to lead a science department (Statistics) at North Carolina State University: Kimberly Sellers
First African-American woman to serve on the North Carolina Council of State: Jessica Holmes
First African-American woman appointed chair of the state of California Assembly Transportation Committee: Lori Wilson
First African American and first woman to lead the Pittsburgh Bureau of Emergency Medical Services: Amera Gilchrist
First African-American woman to serve on the Michigan Supreme Court: Kyra Harris Bolden
First African-American and the first person of color to serve as Chief Justice of the Minnesota Supreme Court: Natalie Hudson
First African-American woman elected to Congress from Virginia: Jennifer McClellan

- 2024

First African American elected to the U.S. House of Representatives from Oregon: Janelle Bynum
First African-American woman to earn a Ph.D. in Robotics from the University of Michigan: Oluwami Dosunmu-Ogunbi
First African American to become Poet Laureate of Texas: Amanda Johnston
First African American and first woman to have their portrait on display at the Mississippi State Capitol: Alyce Clarke
First African-American woman elected to the Kentucky Supreme Court: Pamela R. Goodwine
First African-American woman president of the Florida Court Clerks & Comptrollers (FCCC): Tiffany Moore Russell

- 2025

First woman and first African American to represent Delaware in both chambers of Congress: Lisa Blunt Rochester
First African-American elected Attorney General of Virginia: Jay Jones
First African American to serve as Nebraska State Poet: Jewel Rodgers
First African American to be named Miss Wisconsin: Willow Newell
First African-American woman elected mayor of Plymouth, North Carolina: Crystal Davis
First African-American woman president of the State Bar of New Mexico: Aja N. Brooks
First African-American woman promoted to full professor at Southwestern University, Georgetown, Texas: Alicia Moore
First African-American woman elected sheriff in New York (Columbia County: Jackie Salvatore

- 2026

First woman and first African-American woman appointed to be president of Regis University in Denver, Colorado: Shawna Cooper Whitehead
First African-American woman elected county assessor in the state of California (Santa Clara County): Neysa Fligor
First African-American woman to become president of the New York State Bar Association: Taa Grays
First African American elected Governor of Wisconsin: David Crowley
First African American elected Governor of Nevada: Aaron Ford

== See also ==
- List of first African American mayors
- Timeline of African-American firsts
