= Julia Hall =

Julia Hall may refer to:

- Julia R. Hall (1865–1918), American physician
- Julia Brainerd Hall (1859–1926), American chemist and painter

== See also ==
- Julie Hall (disambiguation)
