= Rosemarie Wesson =

African-American chemist

- Education: University of Michigan; Massachusetts Institute of Technology
- Scientific career
- Fields: Polymer science and engineering
- Workplaces: National Science Foundation; Dow Chemical Company; Louisiana State University; University of Maryland, College Park

Rosemarie Wesson is the Associate Vice Chancellor and University Vice Provost for Research at The City University of New York. She was the first African-American woman to receive a PhD in chemical engineering from the University of Michigan. She has worked at the National Science Foundation, Louisiana State University and Dow Chemical Company.

== Education ==
Wesson was born in Illinois. Wesson studied chemical engineering at Massachusetts Institute of Technology. After her degree, she joined Dow Chemical Company as a researcher in polymer rheology. She earned her PhD at the University of Michigan in 1988. She was the first African-American woman to earn a PhD at the University of Michigan in chemical engineering. Her dissertation topic was the computer-aided analysis of viscoelastic flow. She has since returned, speaking at the annual graduate symposium and winning the alumni merit award.

== Career ==
After completing her PhD, Wesson returned to Dow Chemical Company. She joined Louisiana State University as a professor of chemical engineering in 1991, where she was awarded both outstanding teaching and research awards. She joined the Battele Memorial Lab as a principal researcher and accepted another position at Dow as senior research leader in the Corporate Materials Science Research and Development Lab.

In 2001, Wesson joined the National Science Foundation and spent 13 years working in the divisions of transport, environmental, chemical and bioengineering. Her focus was on sustainable chemistry, engineering and materials. As a Program Director at NSF, she managed both small-business and academic research portfolios focused on energy, nanotechnology, emerging research opportunities and the field of chemical and biological separations. She received the NSF Director's awards for Collaborative Integration and the Director's Award for Superior Accomplishment. She also served as an adjunct professor at University of Maryland, College Park. After working at NSF, Wesson became principal researcher at Battelle Memorial Institute, where she developed the Odyssey Atlasphere.

Wesson joined City College of New York as dean of research in 2015. She is a Fellow of the American Institute of Chemical Engineers. She has served on their board of directors and won the 2014 Minority Action Committee Eminent Chemical Engineers Award for services to minority groups. She contributes to the American Society for Engineering Education. In 2018, she became the first woman treasurer of AIChE.

== Research ==
Dr. Wesson has authored and co-authored numerous technical papers in the area of numerical analyses of polymer crystallization kinetics, structure property relationships of crystalline materials, and finite-element analyses of polymeric flows.
