= Daphne L. Smith =

African-American mathematician

- Born: Daphne Letitia Smith
- Education: Spelman College
- Occupation: Mathematician
- Known for: First African-American woman to earn a Ph.D. in mathematics at Massachusetts Institute of Technology

Daphne Letitia Smith was the first African-American woman to earn a Ph.D. in mathematics at the Massachusetts Institute of Technology (MIT), in 1985. She is the president of the National Alumnae Association of Spelman College, her alma mater, and a member of Spelman's Board of Trustees; in 2011 she was honored with the Alumnae Association's Hall of Fame Award, "the organization’s highest honor".

Smith is originally from Ocala, Florida, and graduated from Spelman College in 1980. At MIT, she studied probability theory as a student of Richard M. Dudley; her dissertation was Vapnik-Červonenkis Classes and the Supremum Distribution of a Gaussian Process. She taught at the University of Georgia, Georgia State University and Spelman College before turning to industry, where she has worked as a mathematician and healthcare analyst specializing in disease management.
