= Carmen E. Turner =

American administrator

- Born: 1931
- Died: April 9, 1992 (aged 61)
- Education: Howard University
- Occupation: Under Secretary of the Smithsonian Institution • General Manager of WMATA
- Predecessor: Richard S. Page
- Successor: William A. Boleyn

Carmen E. Turner (1931 – April 9, 1992) was an American administrator who served as Under Secretary of the Smithsonian Institution and General Manager of the Washington Metropolitan Area Transit Authority (Metro).

Turner was the first African-American woman to lead a major public transit agency.

== Biography ==
Turner was born in Teaneck, New Jersey, the daughter of Carmen Pawley and James Pawley. She grew up in Washington, D.C., and in 1968 graduated from Howard University, later earning a master's degree in public administration and political science from American University (1972).

She started government service as a typist and rose to acting director of civil rights at the United States Transportation Department. At USDOT, she helped to make it possible for women members of the Coast Guard to be allowed to serve on shipboard.

In 1977, Turner became chief of administration at Metro. In May 1983, she stepped in as acting general manager of Metro and two months later was promoted to general manager. As general manager, Turner won wide praise for running what was then the nation's second-largest rail and fourth-largest bus transit system. She was responsible for 7000 employees and the operation of some 2000 buses and rail cars with a combined ridership of 700,000 a day. During her seven-year tenure at Metro, it underwent major expansion, from 47 to 63 stations. Annual ridership grew to 70 million passengers.

In 1988, Metro was named the nation's best public transportation system by the American Public Transit Association. The highlight of Turner's Metro career came in 1990 when Congress authorized $1.3 billion for completing the 103-mile (166 km) system.

Turner left Metro in 1990 to become Under Secretary of the Smithsonian Institution, with responsibilities similar to a chief operating officer.

She died of breast cancer in 1992.
