= Ruth Coles Harris =

American academic and accountant (born 1928)

- Born: September 26, 1928 (age 97); Charlottesville, Virginia, U.S.
- Education: Virginia State University (B.S.); New York University (MBA); College of William & Mary (Ed.D.)
- Spouse: John Benjamin Harris
- Children: 2

Ruth Hortense Coles Harris (born September 26, 1928) is an American educator, professor, and accountant. In 1962, she became the first African American woman in Virginia history to become a Certified Public Account (CPA), and served as the founding Dean of the Virginia Union University Sydney Lewis School of Business. The American Accounting Association has described Harris as a "trailblazer of the accounting profession."

== Early life and education ==
Harris was born on September 26, 1928, in Charlottesville, Virginia. Her father was a dentist and her mother was a public school teacher.

Harris attended segregated public schools as a child and graduated from Jefferson Colored High School. At the age of 15, she enrolled in Virginia State College for Negroes. She graduated as valedictorian in 1948. After graduation, she enrolled at New York University to receive a Master of Business Administration degree.

== Career ==
Harris began her career in academia in 1949, as an accounting professor at Virginia Union University. She became the dean of the business school at the university when it was established. In 1962, Harris became the first African American woman CPA in the Commonwealth of Virginia. She was among the first 100 African Americans in the United States to become CPAs. When Harris sat for the Exam, the testing location, Virginia Beach, did not have any hotels that allowed African Americans.

During her career, Harris received a doctorate in education from the College of William & Mary. In the 1970s, Harris served on the board of directors of the Association to Advance Collegiate Schools of Business. Harris retired from the university in 1997.

After retirement, Harris has served on a variety of boards and committees, including as the appointed chairperson of the State Interdepartmental Committee on Rate-Setting for Children's Facilities, board member of the Richmond Urban League, and as a member of the agency evaluation committee for the United Way of Greater Richmond.

== Awards and honors ==
In 1998, Virginia Union University awarded Harris with an honorary Doctor of Humane Letters degree.

Harris was recognized jointly by the American Institute of Certified Public Accountants and the Virginia Society of Certified Public Accountants (VSCPA) as Virginia's Outstanding Accounting Educator. She also received the Distinguished Career in Accounting Award from VSCPA. In 2021, the organization also established the Curtis C. Duke and Dr. Ruth Coles Harris Scholarship Fund to provide support for underrepresented students pursuing the CPA field. In 2022, she was the inaugural recipient of the Ruth Coles Harris Advancing Diversity and Inclusion Award, which is awarded annually by the VSCPA.

The Virginia General Assembly unanimously passed a resolution honoring Harris as a "visionary educator and trailblazing leader." The Ruth Coles Harris Leadership Institute was established in 2020 in the Sydney Lewis School of Business at Virginia Union University.

Harris is a recipient of the Virginia Business and Professional Women's Leadership Award. In 2015, Harris was named as a Virginia Women in History by the Library of Virginia.

== Works ==
- A Method of Evaluating a Planning, Programming, Budgeting System (PPBS), 1977
