= Joyce Williams Warren =

American judge (born 1949)

Arkansas Sixth Judicial District Judge
- In office 1990–2020

Personal details
- Born: October 25, 1949 (age 76) Pine Bluff, Arkansas, US
- Education: University of Arkansas at Little Rock (BA, JD)

Joyce Williams Warren (born 1949 Pine Bluff, Arkansas) is a retired judge for the Sixth Judicial District in Arkansas. She attended Little Rock Central High School, Rockford College in Illinois, the University of Arkansas at Little Rock (UALR), and went on to be the first Black female graduate of the William H. Bowen School of Law. She is Arkansas' first Black female judge. She began her career as a clerk at the Arkansas Supreme Court in 1977. She went on to serve in the Arkansas government in a variety of positions, and for a time was in private practice. In 1990 she was elected as a judge to the Sixth Circuit of Arkansas, where she served until 2020. In 2023 Warren was inducted into the Arkansas Women's Hall of Fame.
