= Pamela McCauley =

American engineer

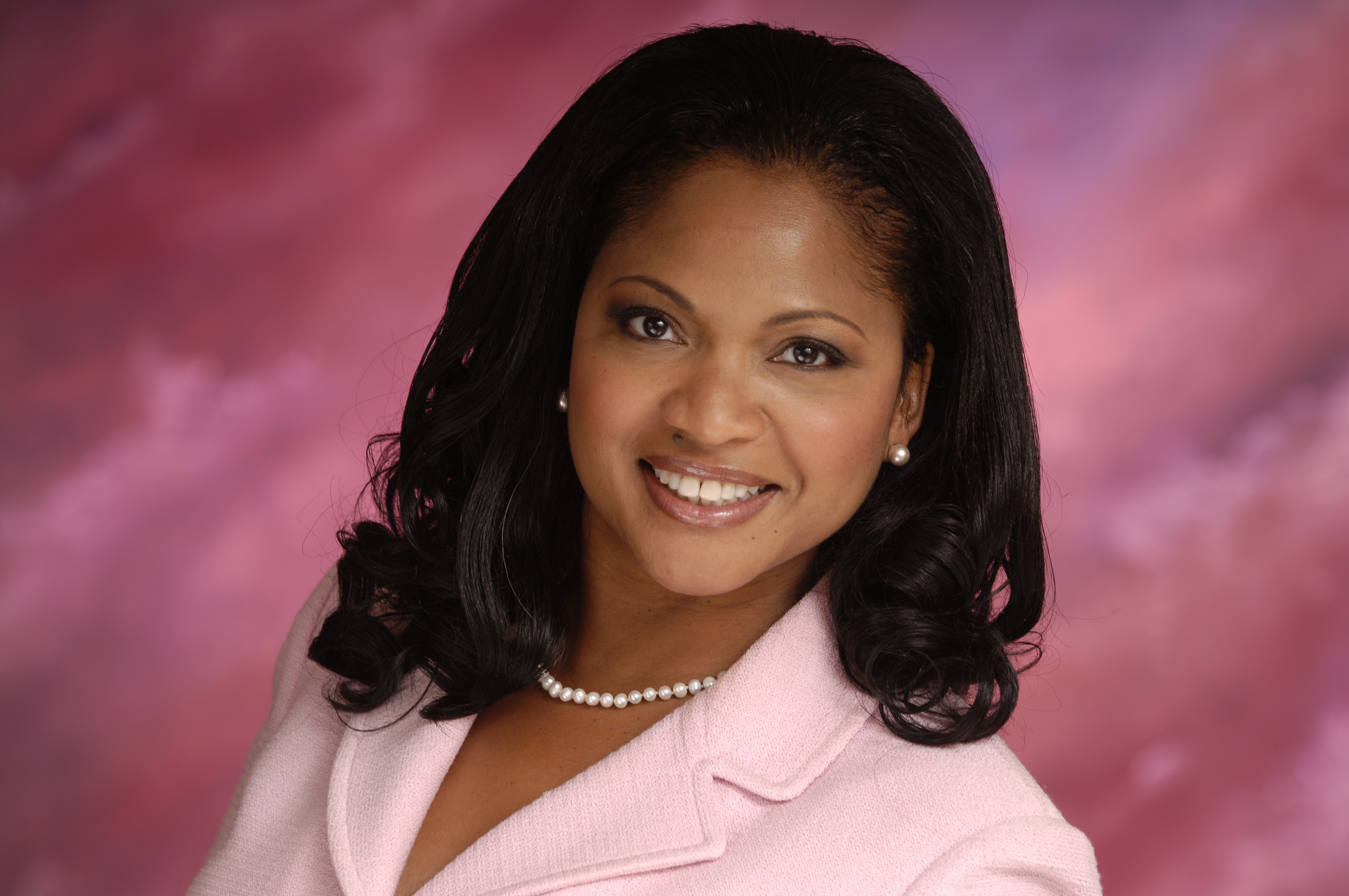
- Occupation: Associate Dean for Academic Programs in the Wilson College of Textiles at North Carolina State University

Academic background
- Education: University of Oklahoma (BS, MS, PhD)

Academic work
- Discipline: Industrial engineering
- Notable works: Winners Don't Quit Today... They Call Me Doctor Transforming Your STEM Career Through Leadership and Innovation: Inspiration and Strategies for Women Ergonomics: Foundational Principles, Applications and Technologies (Ergonomics Design Mgmt Theory) (Ergonomics Design & Mgmt. Theory & Applications)

Pamela McCauley (formerly McCauley-Bush; born 1963) is an American engineer. She was the first African-American woman granted an engineering Ph.D. in the state of Oklahoma.

== Background ==
McCauley became a Martin Luther King, Jr. visiting associate professor of aeronautics and astronautics at the Massachusetts Institute of Technology. McCauley is professor and director of the Ergonomics Laboratory in the University of Central Florida Department of Industrial Engineering and Management Systems since 1993. McCauley was the program director for the National Science Foundation's I-Core program from 2018-2020.

McCauley became a mother at the age of 15. In 2013, McCauley was invited to the Orlando BETA Center to speak to the teenage mothers to share her story and encourage them to pursue technical career.

McCauley founded T-STEM, which advocates for national STEM education, leadership, diversity and innovation initiatives in coordination with universities, colleagues and schools.

McCauley worked as chief technology officer of Bush Enterprises between 1999 and 2012, where is provided technical and analytic support, software development, and industrial engineering.

== Books ==
McCauley has authored several books, including Winners Don't Quit: Today They Call Me Doctor published in 2010, Transforming Your STEM Career Through Leadership and Innovation: Inspiration and Strategies for Women published in 2012, and Ergonomics: Foundational Principles, Applications and Technologies (Ergonomics Design Mgmt Theory) (Ergonomics Design & Mgmt. Theory & Applications) published in 2011.

== Awards ==
In 2012 McCauley was awarded a U.S. Fulbright Scholar for mathematically modeling human factors and related risks in disaster management.
