= Mildred Nilon =

American librarian

Mildren Nilon

Nancy Mildred Nilon (July 26, 1920 – September 30, 2017) was the University of Colorado Boulder (CU)’s first African American librarian. CU created a scholarship in honor of her and her husband, Charles, who was CU's first African American faculty member.

== Early life and education ==
Nancy Mildred Harper (who went by the name Mildred) was born July 26, 1920, in Montgomery, Alabama. She was the youngest of three children of Lemuel Paul Harper and Fannie Harper. Her father's job as a railroad mail clerk made her family slightly better off than most African American families at the time, which allowed her to attend Alabama State Laboratory High School. However, her race and gender limited her career choices. She took a position teaching but did not enjoy it, so she returned to school and obtained a master's degree at Atlanta University in library science.

== Career ==
Nilon held a series of library jobs in Atlanta, Alabama, and Detroit until her husband, Charles, accepted a job teaching in the University of Colorado's English department in Boulder, Colorado, in 1956. In 1962 she was offered a position with the University of Colorado Libraries helping with an emergency staffing situation. CU asked her to return in the fall of 1962 to work in the library's General Reference and Interlibrary Loans section. She was eventually appointed assistant director for public services, a position she held until her retirement in 1987. She was CU's first African American librarian. In 1986 she won the University of Colorado Boulder's Robert L. Stearns Award for "outstanding service or achievement."

== Family ==
Mildred Harper met Charles Nilon at Alabama State University and they married in 1953. They had a son, Charles Nilon, Jr., who graduated from Morehouse College in Atlanta. Charles Nilon, Jr., is now a faculty member at the University of Missouri.

== Community involvement ==
Nilon was active in numerous community organizations, including the United Black Women of Boulder Valley, the Town and Country YWCA board, the Mental Health board, and the Historic Boulder board. Soon after arriving in town the Nilons tried to buy a house outside of the Goss/Grove area which was Boulder's “Black ghetto” at the time. Owners changed their minds about selling to the Nilons after their neighbors complained when the Nilons were shown houses. They were finally able to purchase a house outside the “ghetto” which paved the way for other African American families to purchase homes without discrimination. Their experience led to their efforts to end housing segregation and support affordable housing in Boulder. While at CU they mentored African American students who were welcomed into their home. They sought to increase the number of African American faculty and students at a time when there were very few of either on campus.

== Scholarship ==
The Charles and Mildred Nilon Teacher Education Scholarship Fund honors the Nilons. It is designated for students who are “committed to advancing educational opportunities in under-resourced schools, especially those that serve African American communities.”

Mildred Nilon died September 30, 2017, in Boulder at the age of 97.
