= Bertha Holliday =

Community psychologist

- Occupations: Community Psychologist and Activist
- Awards: APA Division 45 Distinguished Career Contribution to Service Award (2001); Teachers College, Columbia University: Social Justice Action Award (2011)

Academic background
- Education: University of Chicago; Harvard University; University of Texas at Austin

Bertha Garrett Holliday is a community psychologist known for her expertise on ethnic minority issues. Her work has focused on processes of child and family socialization and the academic experiences and achievement of Black youth. Holliday was Senior Director of the Office of Ethnic Minority Affairs at the American Psychological Association (APA), where she led APA's efforts to increase scientific understanding of role of culture and ethnicity in human relationships and behavior. She retired from the Office of Ethnic Minority Affairs in 2010 after 16 years of service to the APA.

Holliday is a Fellow of APA Division 45 (Society for the Psychological Study of Culture, Ethnicity & Race). In 2001, she received the Distinguished Career Contribution to Service Award from APA Division 45. In 2011, she was awarded the Social Justice Action Award from Teachers College, Columbia University.

== Biography ==
Holliday was born and raised in Kansas City, MO. As a member of a family that was continuously involved in social justice and civic engagement efforts, Holliday reported that she walked her first picket line at age 4, protesting the unacceptable conditions of her overcrowded, segregated kindergarten.

Holliday completed a BA in psychology at the University of Chicago and an EdM in Counselor Education at Harvard University, and then obtained a PhD in Community Psychology at the University of Texas at Austin. She subsequently completed a post-doctoral fellowship in Lifespan Development and Ecological Psychology at Cornell University. Prior to joining the APA Office of Ethnic Minority Affairs, Holliday was the first African-American faculty member at Vanderbilt Peabody College of Education and Human Development (in the Department of Psychology and Human Development). Among her widely cited papers are several historical reports of early studies on Black youth that were conducted by the American Council on Education in the 1930–1940s.

Since retiring from the APA, Holliday has been involved in the leadership of the Bloomingdale Civic Association in Washington, DC.
