= Michelle Lollie =

American physicist

Michelle L. J. Lollie
- Born: 1982 (age 43–44)
- Education: Clark Atlanta University, Rose–Hulman Institute of Technology, Louisiana State University
- Scientific career
- Fields: Quantum optics
- Workplaces: Quantinuum

Michelle L. J. Lollie (born 1982) is an American quantum optics and laser systems physicist.

She was the first African American woman to graduate with PhD in physics from the Louisiana State University in 2016. Her thesis focused on investigating classical and quantum optics in communication protocols. Lollie is now an advanced laser scientist at Quantinuum and her work contributes to the development of quantum computers.

== Education ==
Lollie initially obtained a bachelor degree in finance at Clark Atlanta University to pursue banking, and later obtained a bachelors degree in physics at Rose–Hulman Institute of Technology as non-traditional student. She became the first black woman to obtain a PhD in physics from Louisiana State University, completing her thesis on fiber-based quantum cryptography and communication protocols in 2016.

== Career and research ==
Lollie worked in finance before pursuing an education in physics through the American Physical Society-sponsored Bridge Program for graduate students from backgrounds that posed obstacles for pursuing physics through a traditional route. She continues to advocate for equity and diversity at APS and in physics. Lollie now works at Quantinuum as an optical physicist to develop the foundations for the development of quantum computers.

== Selected publications ==
- Lollie, Michelle L J; Mostafavi, Fatemeh; Bhusal, Narayan; Hong, Mingyuan; You, Chenglong; León-Montiel, Roberto de J; Magaña-Loaiza, Omar S; Quiroz-Juárez, Mario A (2022-07-19). "High-dimensional encryption in optical fibers using spatial modes of light and machine learning". Machine Learning: Science and Technology. 3 (3): 035006. arXiv:2108.06420. Bibcode:2022MLS&T...3c5006L. doi:10.1088/2632-2153/ac7f1b. ISSN 2632-2153.
- Mostafavi, Fatemeh; Jafari, Zeinab; Lollie, Michelle L. J.; You, Chenglong; De Leon, Israel; Magaña-Loaiza, Omar S. (2022-06-27). "Conditional quantum plasmonic sensing". Nanophotonics. 11 (14): 3299–3306. arXiv:2203.09654. Bibcode:2022Nanop..11..160M. doi:10.1515/nanoph-2022-0160. ISSN 2192-8614. PMC 11501117. PMID 39635548.
- Abbott, R.; Abbott, T. D.; Abraham, S.; Acernese, F.; Ackley, K.; Adams, A.; Adams, C.; Adhikari, R. X.; Adya, V. B.; Affeldt, C.; Agarwal, D.; Agathos, M.; Agatsuma, K.; Aggarwal, N.; Aguiar, O. D. (2021-12-01). "Search for Lensing Signatures in the Gravitational-Wave Observations from the First Half of LIGO–Virgo's Third Observing Run". The Astrophysical Journal. 923 (1): 14. arXiv:2105.06384. Bibcode:2021ApJ...923...14A. doi:10.3847/1538-4357/ac23db. ISSN 0004-637X.
- Feng, Wei; Jiang, Kebei; Lollie, Michelle L.-J.; Zubairy, M. Suhail; Dowling, Jonathan P. (2014-04-15). "Super-resolving single-photon number-path-entangled state and its generation". Physical Review A. 89 (4) 043824. arXiv:1310.5575. Bibcode:2014PhRvA..89d3824F. doi:10.1103/PhysRevA.89.043824.
