= Sampson W. Keeble =

American politician

Tennessee House of Representatives
- In office 1873–1875

Personal details
- Born: March 18, 1833 Rutherford County, Tennessee
- Died: June 19, 1887 (aged 54) Richmond, Texas, U.S.
- Party: Republican
- Spouse: Rebecca Cantrell Gordon

Sampson W. Keeble (May 18, 1833 – June 19, 1887) was a businessman and politician in Tennessee during the Reconstruction era. In 1872, he was the first African American elected to the Tennessee Legislature, serving from 1873 to 1875 in the Tennessee House of Representatives as a Republican member from Davidson County.

Born into slavery in Rutherford County, Keeble became a barber. The profession enabled practitioners to build networks in the business community. At some time, Keeble moved to Nashville in Davidson County, Tennessee, where he built his business. After freedmen were granted the franchise, he joined the Republican Party and became politically active. In addition to serving in the legislature, he was a Davidson County magistrate, serving from 1877 to 1882.

A bronze bust of Keeble was dedicated in the Tennessee State Capitol in 2010.

== See also ==
- African American officeholders from the end of the Civil War until before 1900
