= Mareena Robinson Snowden =

American nuclear engineer

Mareena Katherine Robinson Snowden is the first Black woman to earn a Ph.D. in nuclear engineering from the Massachusetts Institute of Technology.

== Education ==
Snowden enrolled at Florida A&M University as a business major.

In Spring 2011, Snowden was graduated from Florida A&M University as Mareena Robinson, with a B.S. Degree in Physics.

In 2017, Snowden was graduated from the Massachusetts Institute of Technology with a Ph.D., nuclear science and engineering, as Mareena K. Robinson-Snowden, 30 years old, becoming the first self-identified American black woman to graduate with a Ph.D. in nuclear engineering from the MIT, walking across the commencement stage on 8 June 2018, after 11 years of post-secondary study. .

== Career ==
Snowden worked as a National Nuclear Security Administration Graduate Fellow in the Office of Nuclear Energy at the US Department of Energy before serving as a Stanton Nuclear Security Fellow at the Carnegie Endowment for International Peace.
