= Gladys A. Moore Perdue =

American organist and instructor (1898–1998)

Gladys Anne Moore Perdue
- Born: 1898
- Died: 1998 (aged 99–100)
- Education: New England Conservatory of Music
- Occupation: Organist
- Employer: Tuskegee Institute

Gladys Anne Moore Perdue (1898–1998) was an organist and instructor who was the first African American woman to graduate from the New England Conservatory of Music in 1924.

== Education ==
Perdue received a diploma in the pianoforte from the conservatory in 1924. Between 1925 and 1931, Perdue taught music at Tuskegee Institute.

== Career ==
Perdue played as an accompanist at the commemorative mass meeting of the 21st biennial convention of the National Association of Colored Women in 1939. Perdue was also an accompanist for the 464 Follies, a performance group raising money for benefits offered by the Women's Service Club. Perdue was a patron of the Frederick Douglass Memorial Home in Washington, D.C.

== Legacy ==
Perdue's South End home is part of the Boston Women's Heritage Trail. In 2023, she was recognized as one of "Boston’s most admired, beloved, and successful Black Women leaders" by the Black Women Lead project.
