= Hattie Elam Briscoe =

American lawyer

Hattie Ruth Elam Briscoe (November 12, 1916 – October 17, 2002) was recognized as being the first African American woman to enroll in and graduate from St. Mary's University School of Law in San Antonio, Texas. She was also the first black woman to practice law in Bexar County, Texas, and was the only one for twenty-seven years, from 1956 to 1983.

Briscoe was born in Shreveport, Louisiana in 1916. She moved with her family to Marshall, Texas at age nine. Following high school graduation, she attended Wiley College in Marshall and became a fourth grade teacher in Wichita Falls, Texas. She married William Briscoe in 1940 and the couple relocated to San Antonio.

She studied cosmetology and worked with her husband at Briscoe's Beauty Salon while teaching evening classes at Hicks Beauty School. In 1951 she earned a master's degree from Prairie View A&M University and began teaching cosmetology at Wheatley High School. She decided to pursue a law degree after she was fired from Wheatley for "sassing white folks" and was denied having her case heard in court.

In 1956, she graduated first in her class at St. Mary's University School of Law. After no law firms in San Antonio would hire her, she established her own practice.

Briscoe was a lifetime member of Delta Sigma Theta sorority and numerous law associations, and has been involved in the San Antonio Chamber of Commerce and other local organizations.
