= Frazier Thompson =

First African American student to graduate from the University of Notre Dame

Frazier Leon Thompson
- Born: South Bend, Indiana
- Died: 1991; Dover, DE
- Occupation: Engineer
- Years active: 1944-1990
- Known for: First African-American graduate of the University of Notre Dame. Scholarship in his honor at the university.

Frazier Leon Thompson Sr. (192?–1991), originally from Philadelphia, was the first African-American student to enroll at and graduate from the University of Notre Dame. Thompson began attending Notre Dame in 1944 as part of the V-12 Navy College Training Program and graduated in the class of 1947. He was also the first African-American student to compete in Notre Dame athletics and to win a Notre Dame monogram. Thompson went on to work with the United States Postal Service and as an engineer testing space suit design at NASA

In 1997, the university created the Frazier Thompson scholarship in his honor. The scholarship was first awarded in 1998.
