= Edna C. Robinson Brown =

- Education: Columbia University
- Occupation: Dentist

Dr. Edna C. Robinson Brown, DDS was the first African American woman to practice dentistry in Cambridge, Massachusetts. She began her practice in 1916 as the only African American woman dentist in New England.

Robinson Brown graduated from Columbia Dental School. She was a founding member of the Psi Omega chapter of Alpha Kappa Alpha sorority. The sorority chapter was founded by Robinson Brown, and Dr. Jessie G. Garnett, the first black woman to graduate from Tufts University School of Dental Medicine, among five other reputable black women professionals on the Harvard University campus in 1926. As a chapter member of the Psi Omega, Robinson Brown sponsored annual vocational guidance programs for high school students.

In 2023, she was recognized as one of "Boston's most admired, beloved, and successful Black Women leaders" by the Black Women Lead project.
