= Rachel E. Pruden-Herndon =

American lawyer

Personal details
- Born: Rachel Elizabeth Pruden; February 12, 1898 Atlanta, Georgia, U.S.
- Died: January 10, 1979 (aged 80) Atlanta, Georgia, U.S.
- Party: Democratic
- Education: Atlanta University
- Occupation: Judge, attorney

Rachel Elizabeth Pruden-Herndon (February 12, 1898 – January 10, 1979) was an American attorney who became the first African-American woman to be admitted to the State Bar of Georgia on December 27, 1942. In 1956, she became the first African-American woman from Georgia admitted to practice before the U.S. Supreme Court. She was later appointed as a municipal court judge in 1965.

== Early life and education ==
Rachel Elizabeth Pruden was born on February 12, 1898, in Atlanta, Georgia. She attended Atlanta Public Schools, and graduated from Atlanta University. She studied law under attorney A. T. Walden, while working as his secretary.
