= Julia R. Hall =

Julia R. Hall (October 1, 1865 - April 28, 1918) was an American physician. Graduating from medical school in 1892, Hall was the first woman to work as a resident in the Howard University gynecology clinic. Her career as a physician lasted around fifty years.

== Biography ==
Hall was born in Dandridge, Tennessee on October 1, 1865. Hall and her husband, Reverend Jeremiah L. Hall, moved to Washington, D.C. in 1889. Hall graduated as the only woman in her class from Howard University in 1892. Hall was the first woman at Howard to work as a resident at the school's gynecology clinic. She also worked as a medical advisor to the women at Howard.

Overall, Hall's career in medicine lasted around 50 years. Hall died in Washington on April 28, 1918.
