= Howard University College of Medicine =

Historically black medical school in Washington, D.C.

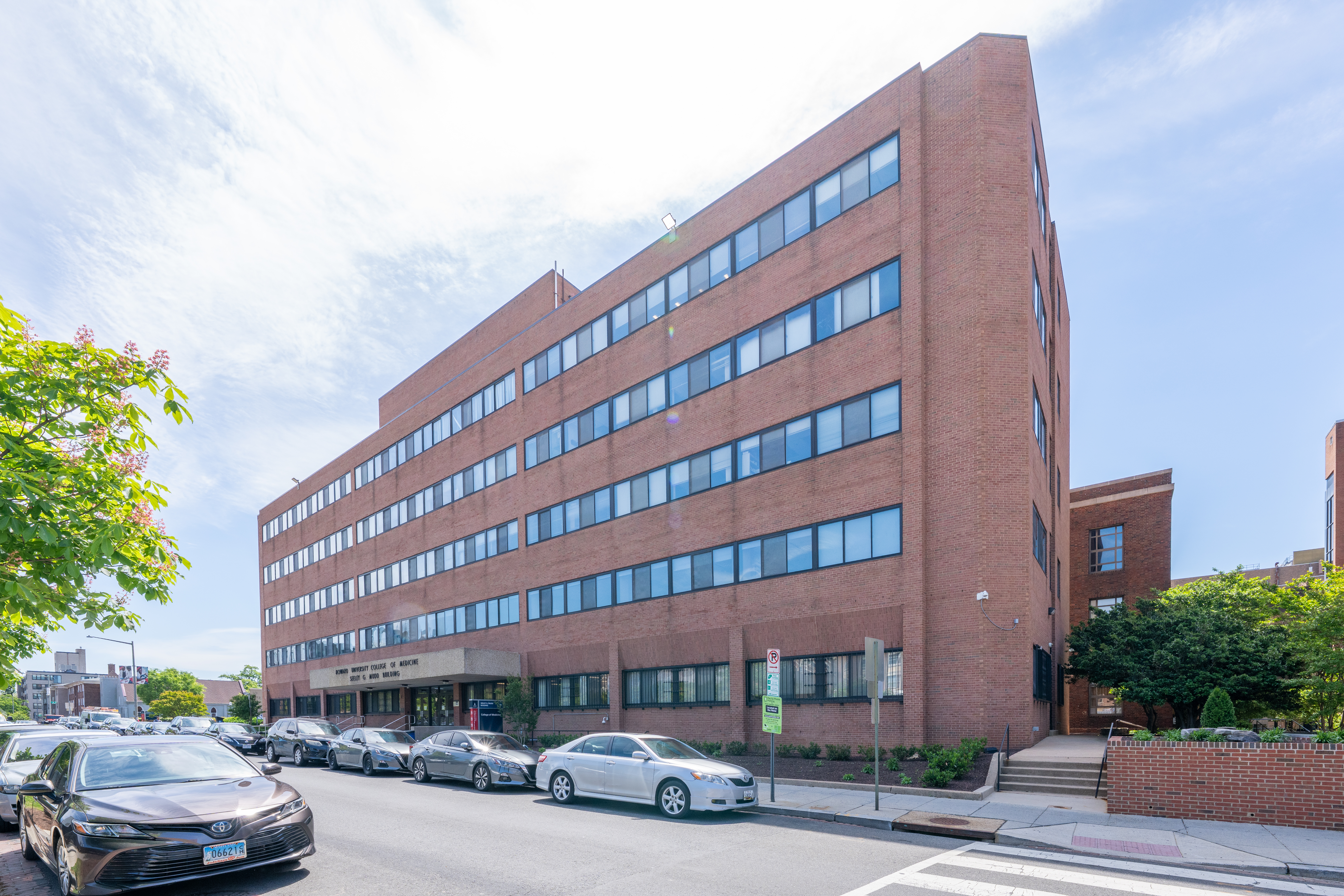
- Motto: Veritas et Utilitas
- Motto in English: Truth and Service
- Type: Private
- Established: 1868
- Dean: Andrea A. Hayes Dixon
- Location: Washington, D.C., United States; 38°55′3″N 77°1′13″W
- Campus: Urban
- Website: medicine.howard.edu

The Howard University College of Medicine (HUCM) is an academic division of Howard University that grants the Doctor of Medicine (M.D.), Ph.D., M.S., and the M.PH. HUCM is located at the Howard University Health Sciences Center in Washington, D.C., and it was founded in 1868 in response to the growing population of the city.

With more than 4,000 living alumni, the college has produced a sizeable share of the African-American physicians practicing in the United States.

The mission of the college includes improving health care through training programs and initiatives, discovering knowledge through research, and supporting the education and training of postgraduate physicians, other healthcare providers, and graduate students in biomedical sciences. Many of the college students gain professional experience at Howard University Hospital, the primary teaching hospital for the school.

== History ==
Founders of Howard University appreciated the urgent need for medical education in the District of Columbia after the Civil War. The name of Howard University is in honor of Major General Oliver Otis Howard. The civil war had just ended, and freed African American people were migrating to the nation's capital in large numbers.

The opening exercise for the newly created medical department was held at the First Congregational Church of Christ on November 5, 1868. The charter approving incorporation of Howard University specified that a department would be devoted to medicine. Dr. Silas Loomis, one of the university founders, was named the first dean of the medical department in 1868. Among the first five faculty members was Alexander Thomas Augusta, reportedly the first African American to serve on a medical school faculty in the United States.

The first classes began on November 9, 1868. There were eight students in attendance and the classes were being taught by five faculty members. The faculty members were Drs. Silas Loomis, Robert Reyburn, Joseph Taber Johnson, Lafayette Loomis, and Alexander Thomas Augusta).

In 1869, a building for the medical department and Freedmen's Hospital was constructed by the Freedmen's Bureau on Pomeroy Street, presently Fifth Street NW. The building housed the medical and pharmacy program (and later the dental program), as well as, the Freedmen's Hospital. In 1927, a new facility was constructed on W Street.

The first alumni association for the college was formed in 1871 by the five graduates of that year. The members of the new association were, William Bennit, James Bowen, George Brooks, Danforth Nichols, and Joseph A. Sladen. In 1923, President Calvin Coolidge, 30th president of the United States, supported Howard University College of Medicine by appropriating $500,000 of federal funds addressing the need for more Black doctors. In 1945, the Howard University Medical Alumni Association (HUMAAA) was incorporated in the District of Columbia.

In September 2020, Michael Bloomberg donated $32.8 million to help lower student debt at the institution. In October of 2022, Andrea A. Hayes Dixon became the first Black woman to become dean of the school.

In 2024, Howard University College of Medicine received a $175 million gift from Bloomberg Philanthropies to support the school's endowment. Also in 2024, the orthopedic surgery residency program lost its accreditation from the Accreditation Council for Graduate Medical Education due to a valid resident complaint. The resident cited structural issues as the basis of the complaint. Howard University was the only HBCU to offer an orthopedic surgery program.

== Graduate programs ==
Howard University College of Medicine has six training programs leading to the M.S. or Ph.D. degrees. These are anatomy, genetics and human genetics, microbiology, biochemistry, pharmacology, and physiology and biophysics.

The largest training program in the college is their four-year M.D. program. HUCM is known for producing physicians who provide healthcare to under-served communities throughout the United States. A major emphasis of HUCM is preparing physicians for under-served communities. Much of the experience these medical students gain with under-served communities is at Howard University Hospital, the primary teaching hospital for HUCM, but students also gain experience with other demographics by working at other hospitals in the D.C. metropolitan area including, Washington Hospital Center, St. Elizabeth's Hospital, and Inova Fairfax Hospital. The community surrounding Howard University Hospital under-served and is promoted as an excellent teaching environment for the HUCM students.

The Howard University Health Sciences Simulation Center opened a major state-of-the-art virtual medical training facility to advance the education of medical students and healthcare professionals. The simulation center, a 6,000-square-foot facility, is a simulated hospital environment that promotes improved communication skills between healthcare workers and their patients.

The college is served by the Louis Stokes Health Sciences Library, named in honor of Louis Stokes, the first African American congressman elected from the state of Ohio.

A long association has existed between Georgetown University and the college. The Georgetown-Howard Universities Center for Clinical and Translational Science (GHUCCTS) promotes clinical research and translational science. This National Institutes of Health (NIH)-funded multi-institutional consortium provides improved research infrastructure, inter-institutional collaboration, research on problems of on underserved populations, and educational programs. Senior investigators such as Dr. Thomas O. Obisesan guide teams of students, trainees, and junior faculty in research on high-impact diseases such as dementia. Dr. Thomas Mellman, co-director of the center, pursues innovative research on post-traumatic stress disorder (PTSD).

== Service ==
In conjunction with the New York chapter of the National Organization for the Advancement of Haitians (NOAH) and the Haitian American Alliance, the college has engaged in an ambitious service-learning-based medical project in Haiti. The team from the college consists of physicians from the departments of obstetrics and gynecology, internal medicine, pediatrics, pathology, and anatomy. The team travelled to Haiti as a humanitarian response to the devastating earthquake in 2010.

== Deans of the college ==
Former deans of the college are:

- Silas Laurence Loomis - 1868–1870
- Robert Rayburn - 1870–1871, 1900–1908
- Gideon S. Palmer - 1871–1881
- Thomas B. Hood - 1881–1900
- Edward A. Balloch - 1908–1928
- Numa Pompilius Garfield Adams - 1929–1940
- John W. Lawlah - 1941–1946
- Joseph L. Johnson - 1946–1955
- Robert S. Jason - 1955–1965
- K. Albert Harden - 1965–1970
- Marion Mann - 1970–1979
- Russell L. Miller - 1979–1988
- Charles H. Epps Jr. - 1988–1995
- Floyd J. Malveaux - 1995–2005
- Robert E. Taylor - 2005–2011
- Mark S. Johnson - 2011–2014
- Hugh E. Mighty - 2014–2022
- Andrea A. Hayes Dixon - 2022–present

== Notable faculty members ==
- Alexander Thomas Augusta, reportedly the first African American to serve on a medical school faculty in the United States
- Lillian Beard, pediatrician and spokesperson for the American Academy of Pediatrics
- Quinn Capers IV, interventional cardiologist, professor and Chair of the Department of Medicine
- Debra Ford, colorectal surgeon and academic administrator
- Celia Maxwell, infectious disease physician and academic administrator
- Ruth Ella Moore, professor and chair of the microbiology department, researcher, reportedly the first African American woman awarded a Ph.D. in the natural sciences in the United States
- Daniel Hale Williams, the first person to conduct successful open heart surgery.

== See also ==
- African American student access to medical schools
