= Flexner Report =

1910 North American report on medical education

The title page for the Flexner Report

The Flexner Report is a book-length landmark report of medical education in the United States and Canada, written by Abraham Flexner and published in 1910 under the aegis of the Carnegie Foundation. Flexner not only described the state of medical education in North America, but he also gave detailed descriptions of the medical schools that were operating at the time. He provided both criticisms and recommendations for improvements of medical education in the United States.

While it had many positive effects on American medical education, the Flexner report has been accused of introducing policies that encouraged systemic racism and sexism.

The Report, also called Carnegie Foundation Bulletin Number Four, called on American medical schools to enact higher admission and graduation standards, and to adhere strictly to the protocols of mainstream science principles in their teaching and research. The report talked about the need for revamping and centralizing medical institutions. Many American medical schools fell short of the standard advocated in the Flexner Report and, subsequent to its publication, nearly half of such schools merged or were closed outright.

Colleges for the education of the various forms of alternative medicine, such as electrotherapy, were closed. Homeopathy, traditional osteopathy, eclectic medicine, and physiomedicalism (botanical therapies that had not been tested scientifically) were derided.

The Report also concluded that there were too many medical schools in the United States, and that too many doctors were being trained. A repercussion of the Flexner Report, resulting from the closure or consolidation of university training, was the closure of all but two black medical schools and the reversion of American universities to male-only admittance programs to accommodate a smaller admission pool.

In Chapter 11, Flexner stressed that the success of medical education reform and the professionalization of medicine relied heavily on the effective legal and ethical functioning of state medical boards. However, he noted that these boards were failing in their mission, stalling progress, and allowing substandard medical practices to continue, thereby jeopardizing public health. This problem persists as a significant issue in the current practice of medicine in the United States.

== Background ==
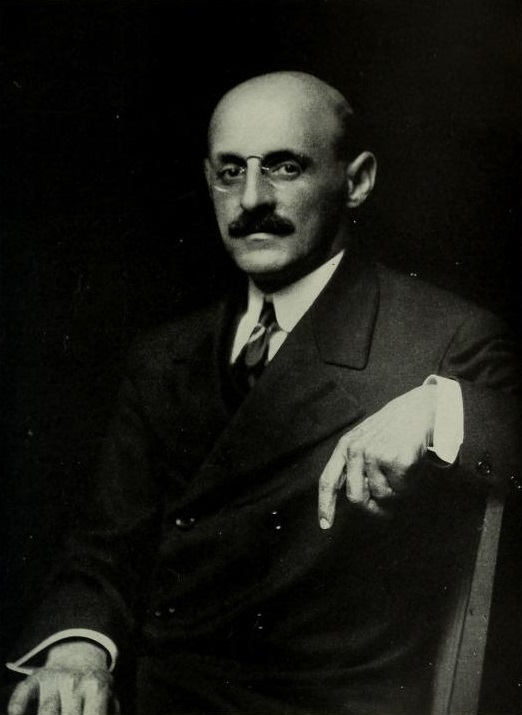
Abraham Flexner

During the nineteenth century, American medicine was neither economically supported nor regulated by the government. Few state licensing laws existed, and when they did exist, they were weakly enforced. There were numerous medical schools, all varying in the type and quality of the education they provided.

In 1904, the American Medical Association (AMA) created the Council on Medical Education (CME), whose objective was to restructure American medical education. At its first annual meeting, the CME adopted two standards: one laid down the minimum prior education required for admission to a medical school; the other defined a medical education as consisting of two years training in human anatomy and physiology followed by two years of clinical work in a teaching hospital. Generally speaking, the council strove to improve the quality of medical students, looking to draw from the society of upper-class, educated students.

In 1908, seeking to advance its reformist agenda and hasten the elimination of schools that failed to meet its standards, the CME contracted with the Carnegie Foundation for the Advancement of Teaching to survey American medical education. Henry Pritchett, president of the Carnegie Foundation and a staunch advocate of medical school reform, chose Abraham Flexner to conduct the survey. Neither a physician, a scientist, nor a medical educator, Flexner held a Bachelor of Arts degree and operated a for-profit school in Louisville, Kentucky. He visited every one of the 155 North American medical schools that were in operation at the time, all of which differed greatly in their curricula, methods of assessment, and requirements for admission and graduation. Summarizing his findings, he wrote:

"Each day students were subjected to interminable lectures and recitations. After a long morning of dissection or a series of quiz sections, they might sit wearily in the afternoon through three or four or even five lectures delivered in methodical fashion by part-time teachers. Evenings were given over to reading and preparation for recitations. If fortunate enough to gain entrance to a hospital, they observed more than participated."

The Report became notorious for its harsh description of certain establishments. For example, Flexner described Chicago's fourteen medical schools as "a disgrace to the State whose laws permit its existence ... indescribably foul ... the plague spot of the nation." Nevertheless, several schools received praise for excellent performance, including Western Reserve (now Case Western Reserve), Michigan, Wake Forest, McGill, Toronto, and particularly Johns Hopkins, which was described as the 'model for medical education'.

The Report ultimately produced many unintended consequences, and many of the repercussions of the Report are still seen in American medicine today. Minority groups, such as African Americans and women, faced fewer opportunities as a result of the publishing of the Flexner Report. Additionally, many medical schools for alternative medicine and osteopathic medicine eventually closed as a result of the Report.

== Recommended changes ==
To help with the transition and change the minds of other doctors and scientists, John D. Rockefeller gave many millions to colleges, hospitals and founded a philanthropic group called "General Education Board" (GEB).

In the nineteenth century, it was relatively easy to not only receive a medical education, but also to start a medical school. When Flexner researched his report, many American medical schools were small "proprietary" trade schools owned by one or more doctors, unaffiliated with a college or university, and run to make a profit. A degree was typically awarded after only two years of study with laboratory work and dissection optional. Many of the instructors were local doctors teaching part-time. There were very few full-time professors, dedicated to medical education. Medical schools did not receive funding, and their only money came from the students' tuitions. Regulation of the medical profession by state governments was minimal or nonexistent. American doctors varied enormously in their scientific understanding of human physiology, and the word "quack" was in common use.

Flexner carefully examined the situation. Using the Johns Hopkins School of Medicine as the ideal medical school, he issued the following recommendations:

1. Reduce both the number of medical schools (from 155 to 31) and the number of poorly trained physicians;
2. Increase the prerequisites to enter medical training;
3. Train physicians to practice in a scientific manner and engage medical faculty in research;
4. Give medical schools control of clinical instruction in hospitals;
5. Hire trained, full-time staff for medical education;
6. Grant medical schools increased funding;
7. Strengthen state regulation of medical licensure

Flexner expressed that he found Hopkins to be a "small but ideal medical school, embodying in a novel way, adapted to American conditions, the best features of medical education in England, France, and Germany." To Flexner, Hopkins incorporated the high standards of German medical education, while keeping the American standard of high respect for patients by physicians. In his efforts to ensure that Hopkins was the standard to which all other medical schools in the United States were compared, Flexner went on to claim that all the other medical schools were subordinate in relation to this "one bright spot." In addition to Johns Hopkins School of Medicine, Flexner also considered the medical schools at Harvard, University of Michigan, and the University of Pennsylvania to be strong schools. He said that medical schools that did not meet these high standards must change their approach to medical education or close their doors.

Flexner also believed that admission to a medical school should require, at minimum, a high school diploma and at least two years of college or university study, primarily devoted to basic science. When Flexner researched his report, in the nineteenth century, only 16 out of 155 medical schools in the United States and Canada required applicants to have completed two or more years of university education. By 1920, 92 percent of U.S. medical schools required this prerequisite of applicants. Flexner also argued that the length of medical education should be four years, and its content should be what the CME agreed to in 1905. Flexner recommended that the proprietary medical schools should either close or be incorporated into existing universities. Furthermore, he stated that medical schools needed to be part of a larger university since a proper stand-alone medical school would have to charge too much in order to break even financially.

Less known is Flexner's recommendation that medical schools appoint full-time clinical professors. During the research of his report, Flexner noted a lack of dedicated, full-time professors. American medical education needed committed professors to teach the next generations of physicians. Holders of these appointments would become "true university teachers, barred from all but charity practice, in the interest of teaching." Flexner pursued this objective for years, despite widespread opposition from existing medical faculty.

Flexner was the child of German immigrants, and he had studied and traveled in Europe extensively. He was well aware that one could not practice medicine in continental Europe without having undergone an extensive specialized university education. There were many aspects of German medical education that Flexner, along with other medical educators and physicians who had traveled to Germany, admired, such as their national standards for students and universities, academic freedom, and the expectation of postgraduate training. Furthermore, many physicians who traveled to Europe to receive postgraduate training were impressed with the German dedication to research, innovation, and teaching. In effect, Flexner demanded that American medical education conform to prevailing practice in continental Europe.

By and large, medical schools in Canada and the United States followed many of Flexner's recommendations. However, schools have increased their emphasis on matters of public health.

=== Strengthening state regulation of medical licensure ===
Chapter 11 of the Flexner Report, "The State Boards," offers a scathing critique of the medical regulatory landscape at the time, particularly focusing on the inefficacy and inconsistency of state medical boards. Flexner identifies the critical role these boards were intended to play in upholding medical education standards, both legally and ethically, but argues that they had largely failed in this responsibility.

"In 1906, the worst of the Chicago schools a school with no entrance requirement, no laboratory teaching, no hospital connections made before state boards the best record attained by any Chicago school in that year. This school, essentially the same now as then, has only recently been declared "not in good standing" with the state board of Illinois. Everywhere in Canada and the United States wretched institutions refute criticism by pointing to their successful state board records."

Flexner's broader reform plan, which aimed to elevate medical education in the United States, was fundamentally dependent on state medical boards functioning as effective gatekeepers to the profession. He insisted that state boards must rigorously ensure that only those who completed proper, standardized training could enter medical practice. From a legal standpoint, state boards were to have the authority to license practitioners, while ethically, they were responsible for maintaining the integrity of the profession by enforcing these standards.

"The power that validates the diploma with its license must have the strength to protect its issues against either debasement or infringement."

However, Flexner's report critiques the widespread corruption and lack of uniformity among state boards, which allowed substandard medical schools to continue operating. The boards were often controlled by political forces rather than by educational or professional considerations, leading to inconsistency in their enforcement of licensing standards. Some states maintained high standards, while others allowed almost anyone with minimal training to practice medicine.

"In many states appointments are regarded as political spoils; quite generally teachers are ineligible for appointment. It happens, therefore, that the boards are sometimes weak, and either unwilling to antagonize the schools or legally incapable of so doing; again, well meaning but incompetent; in some cases unquestionably neither weak nor well meaning, but cunning, powerful, and closely aligned with selfish and harmful political interests."

Flexner lamented that this patchwork regulatory system undermined his vision for a unified, scientific, and ethical medical profession across the U.S. His plan relied on the boards acting as ethical watchdogs for public health and safety, but the failures of these boards to fulfill their role were highlighted as a significant barrier to achieving widespread reform.

== Impact of the report ==
Many aspects of the medical profession in North America changed following the Flexner Report. Medical training adhered more closely to the scientific method and became grounded in human physiology and biochemistry. Medical research aligned more fully with the protocols of scientific research. Average physician quality significantly increased.

=== Medical school closings ===
Flexner wanted to improve both the admissions standards of medical school and the quality of medical education itself. He recognized that many of the medical schools had inadequate admissions requirements and a lack of adequate education. Consequently, Flexner sought to reduce the number of medical schools in the United States. A majority of American institutions granting MD or DO degrees as of the date of the Report (1910) closed within two to three decades. (In Canada, only the medical school at Western University was deemed inadequate, but none was closed or merged subsequent to the Report.) In 1904, before the Report, there were 160 MD-granting institutions with more than 28,000 students. By 1920, after the Report, there were only 85 MD-granting institutions, educating only 13,800 students. By 1935, there were only 66 medical schools operating in the United States.

Between 1910 and 1935, more than half of all American medical schools merged or closed. The dramatic decline was in some part due to the implementation of the Report's recommendation that all "proprietary" schools be closed and that medical schools should henceforth all be connected to universities. Of the 66 surviving MD-granting institutions in 1935, 57 were part of a university. An important factor driving the mergers and closures of medical schools was the national regulation and enforcement of medical school criteria: All state medical boards gradually adopted and enforced the Report 's recommendations. In response to the Flexner Report, some schools fired senior faculty members as part of a process of reform and renewal.

=== Impact on the role of physician ===
The vision for medical education described in the Flexner Report narrowed medical schools' interests to disease, moving away from an interest on the system of health care or society's health beyond disease. Preventive medicine and population health were not considered a responsibility of physicians, bifurcating "health" into two separate fields: scientific medicine and public health.

=== Impact on African-American doctors and patients ===
The Flexner Report has been criticized for introducing policies that encouraged systemic racism .

Flexner advocated for the closing of all but two of the historically black medical schools. As a result, only Howard University College of Medicine and Meharry Medical College were left open, while five other schools were closed. Flexner emphasized his view that black doctors should treat only black patients and should play roles subservient to those of white physicians. Flexner promoted the idea that African American medical students should be trained in "hygiene rather than surgery" and be employed as "sanitarians," with a primary role to protect white Americans from disease. Flexner stated in the Report:

"A well-taught negro sanitarian will be immensely useful; an essentially untrained negro wearing an M.D. degree is dangerous."

Furthermore, along with his adherence to germ theory, Flexner argued that, if not properly trained and treated, African-Americans posed a health threat to middle and upper-class whites. Flexner argued that African American physicians should be educated in order to stop the transmission of diseases among African Americans and to prevent the contamination of white people from those same diseases.

"The practice of the Negro doctor will be limited to his own race, which in its turn will be cared for better by good Negro physicians than by poor white ones. But the physical well-being of the Negro is not only of moment to the Negro himself. Ten million of them live in close contact with sixty million whites. Not only does the Negro himself suffer from hookworm and tuberculosis; he communicates them to his white neighbors, precisely as the ignorant and unfortunate white contaminates him. Self-protection not less than humanity offers weighty counsel in this matter; self- interest seconds philanthropy. The Negro must be educated not only for his sake, but for ours. He is, as far as the human eye can see, a permanent factor in the nation."

Flexner's findings also restricted opportunities for African-American physicians in the medical sphere. Even the Howard and Meharry schools struggled to stay open following the Flexner Report, having to meet the institutional requirements of white medical schools, reflecting a divide in access to health care between white and African-Americans. Following the Flexner Report, African-American students sued universities, challenging the precedent set by Plessy v. Ferguson. However, those students were met by opposition from schools that remained committed to segregated medical education. It was not until 15 years after Brown v. Board of Education in 1954 that the AAMC ensured access to medical education for African-Americans and minorities by supporting the diversification of medical schools.

The closure of the five schools, and the fact that black students were not admitted to many U.S. medical schools for the 50 years following the Flexner Report, has contributed to the low numbers of American-born physicians of color as the ramifications are still felt, more than a century later. Tens of thousands of African American physicians disappeared as a result of the Flexner Report. In relation to the national Census, physicians belonging to minority groups, including African Americans, remain underrepresented in medicine.

In response to the racist writings of the Flexner Report, the AAMC decided to rename the prestigious Abraham Flexner award in 2020. David Acosta, M.D., the chief diversity and inclusion officer of AAMC, stated, "We must not ignore medicine's racist history and make every effort toward reparation when this history is identified." However, the view that Flexner and the Report were detrimental to black medical schools is resisted by Thomas N. Bonner, who contended that Flexner worked to save the two black medical schools that were graduating most of the black physicians at that time.

=== Impact on women ===
The Flexner Report has also been criticized for introducing policies that encouraged sexism, resulting in "the near elimination of women in the physician workforce between 1910 and 1970." Before the publication of the Flexner Report, in the mid-to-latter part of the nineteenth century, universities had just begun opening and expanding female admissions as part of both women's and co-educational facilities with the founding of co-educational Oberlin College in 1833 and private all-women's colleges such as Vassar College and Pembroke College. Furthermore, many women opened their own medical schools for women as a response to other medical schools refusing to admit them.

In the Report, Flexner noted that there were few women in medical education. Flexner believed that the small numbers of female medical students and female physicians was not due to a lack of opportunity because, as he saw it, there were ample opportunities for women to be educated in medicine. Thus, he believed that the low numbers were due to a decreased desire and tendency to enter medical school.

“Now that women are freely admitted to the medical profession, it is clear that they show a decreasing inclination to enter it. More schools in all sections are open to them; fewer attend and fewer graduate.”

Flexner also emphasized women's particular role in medicine throughout the Report, stating that "[w]oman has so apparent a function in certain medical specialties". While some people thought that women were the intellectual equals of men and could be proficient in any field, the majority assumed that women were naturally nurturing and loving, and if they were going to pursue a medical career, they should do so in child health, occupational health, or maternal health. Today, it is speculated that the Report may have been a factor in encouraging female physicians to specialize in pediatrics, obstetrics and gynecology rather than other disciplines.

=== Impact on alternative medicine ===
When Flexner researched his report, "modern" medicine faced vigorous competition from several quarters, including osteopathic medicine, chiropractic medicine, electrotherapy, eclectic medicine, naturopathy, and homeopathy. Flexner clearly doubted the scientific validity of all forms of medicine other than that based on scientific research, deeming any approach to medicine that did not advocate the use of treatments such as vaccines to prevent and cure illness as tantamount to quackery and charlatanism. Medical schools that offered training in various disciplines including electromagnetic field therapy, phototherapy, eclectic medicine, physiomedicalism, naturopathy, and homeopathy, were told either to drop these courses from their curriculum or lose their accreditation and underwriting support. A few schools resisted for a time, but eventually most schools for alternative medicine complied with the Report or shut their doors.

=== Impact on osteopathic medicine ===
While almost all the alternative medical schools listed in the Flexner Report were closed, the American Osteopathic Association (AOA) brought a number of osteopathic medical schools into compliance with Flexner's recommendations to produce an evidence-based approach and practice. Today, the curricula of DO- and MD-awarding medical schools are now nearly identical, the chief difference being the additional instruction in osteopathic schools of osteopathic manipulative medicine.

== See also ==
- Committee of Ten
- African American student access to medical schools
