= African American student access to medical schools =

History of segregation of medical studies

The history of African American student access to medical schools is marked by systematic exclusion, the establishment of independent Black institutions, and ongoing efforts to achieve equality in the healthcare workforce. An American Medical Association timeline of Black Americans' efforts to join the medical profession from 1846 to 1968 shows a succession of refusals to admit Black students and the development of a racially segregated medical education system. Though some progress has been made, African Americans "have been historically excluded and remain underrepresented throughout all stages of medicine relative to their numbers in the general population."

== Pre-Civil War Period (1700s–1861) ==
During the colonial and antebellum periods, African Americans were largely barred from formal medical training. Most African American healers practiced traditional medicine or learned through apprenticeships. During much of this period, the reliance on apprenticeships was typical for both White and African American students. Later, in the first few decades of the 19th century, medical curricula were available at several American institutions (none of which admitted African American students) and White students from affluent families were often sent to Europe (especially France) where medical teaching was more advanced.

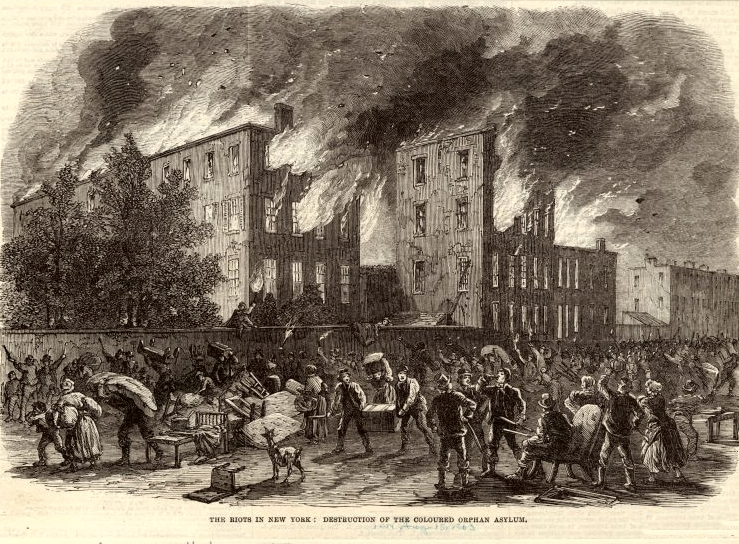
The original building of the Colored Orphan Asylum burning in New York City. The Asylum was burned down by Irish mobs on July 13, 1863, during the first day of the New York Draft Riots.

Black medical practitioners whose careers marked progress during this period include:

- James Derham (May 2, 1762—1802?) was an American physician and emancipated slave who is thought to be the first African American to formally practice medicine in the United States, though he never received an M.D. degree.
- James McCune Smith (1813–1865) was an American physician, apothecary, abolitionist and author. He was the first African American to earn a medical degree. Because no American medical school would admit him, Smith traveled to Scotland to attend the University of Glasgow, becoming the first African American to earn a medical degree in 1837. After his return to the United States, he also became the first African American to run a pharmacy. In addition to practicing as a physician for nearly 20 years at the Colored Orphan Asylum in Manhattan, Smith contributed articles to medical journals, participated in learned societies, and wrote numerous essays and articles drawing on his medical and statistical training. He was never admitted to the American Medical Association or to local medical associations.
- David J. Peck (c. 1826–1855) was an American physician. He was the first African American to receive a Doctor of Medicine from an American medical school. He graduated in 1847 from Rush Medical College in Chicago. He set up his medical practice in Philadelphia, but shortly thereafter moved to Nicaragua, where he died fighting against American insurgents (who, among other things, sought to legalize slavery in the country) during the Filibuster War.

== Post-Civil War period (1865–1910) ==
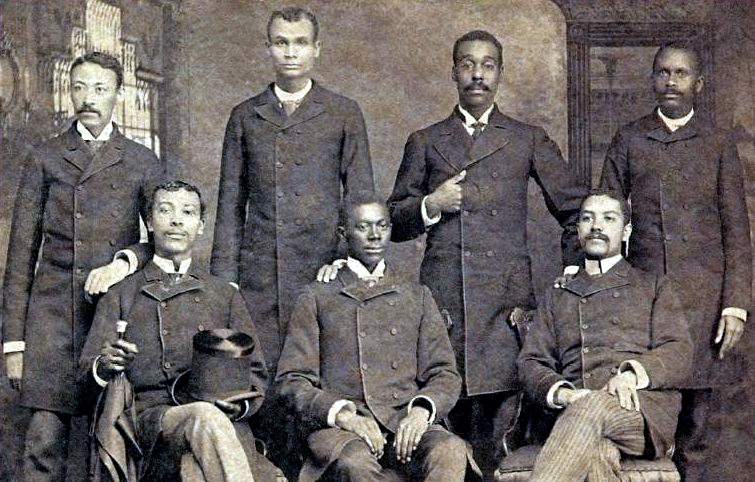
Leonard Medical School's graduating class of 1889.

Following the Civil War, the need for African American physicians became acute as millions of freed slaves required medical care. Between 1868 and 1904, 14 medical schools were established to train African-American physicians who were not eligible for admission to White institutions. Schools that were founded and later closed include:

- Provident Hospital and Training School was founded in 1891 and was the first medical school to be founded by the African American community.
- Leonard Medical School (founded 1882; closed 1918) was located in Raleigh, North Carolina and was the first four-year medical school in the South.
- An additional 4 medical schools admitted African American students but were closed in the early 20th century: Flint Medical College (New Orleans. Closed 1911); Louisville National Medical College. (Louisville, Kentucky. Closed 1912); Knoxville Medical College (Knoxville, Tennessee. Closed 1910); University of West Tennessee Medical Department (Memphis, Tennessee. Closed 1923).

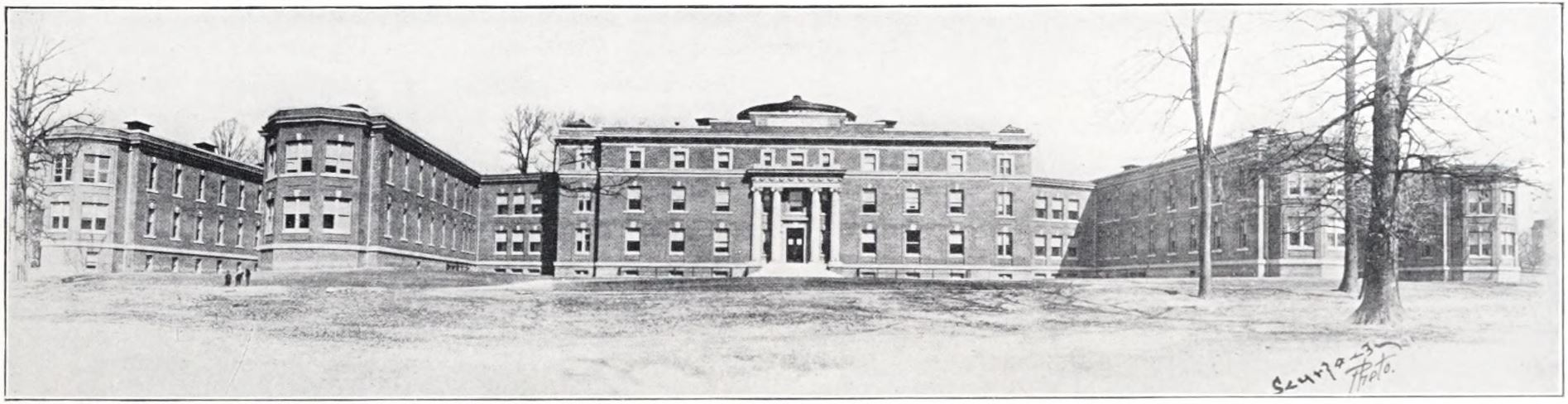
The 1909 Freedmen's Hospital building, c. 1910, associated with Howard University College of Medicine

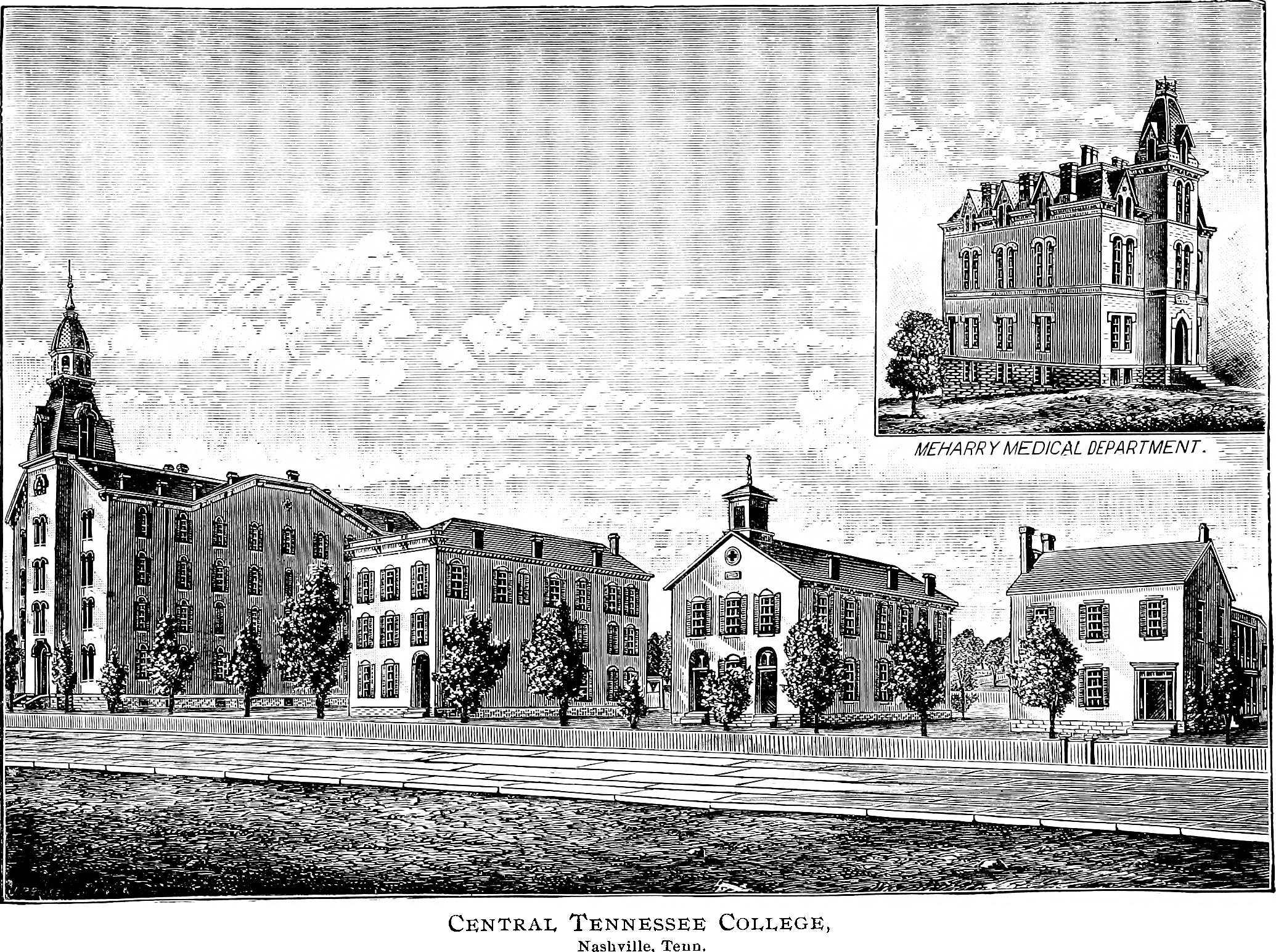
Central Tennessee College with Meharry Medical College inset in top right corner, 1895.

Key Institutions founded during this period and that have survived to the present day are:

- Howard University College of Medicine (founded 1868 in Washington, DC). Freedmen's Hospital and Asylum was established in 1862 to care for freed, disabled and aged blacks. In 1863, it was placed under the charge of Dr. Alexander Augusta, the first African American to head a hospital in the United States. After the Civil War, it became the teaching hospital of Howard University College of Medicine.
- Meharry Medical College (founded 1876 in Nashville, Tennessee): A Methodist affiliated institution founded and run by White businessmen to provide physicians to serve the Black community.

By the turn of the century, these schools were responsible for training the vast majority of African American physicians in the United States. The closing of many medical schools, including most of those serving African American students, reflected the evolution in norms for medical education, making it both more scientific and more expensive to produce, and to the Flexner Report's impact on school closures.

The Flexner Report, ongoing curriculum reform and medical school closures

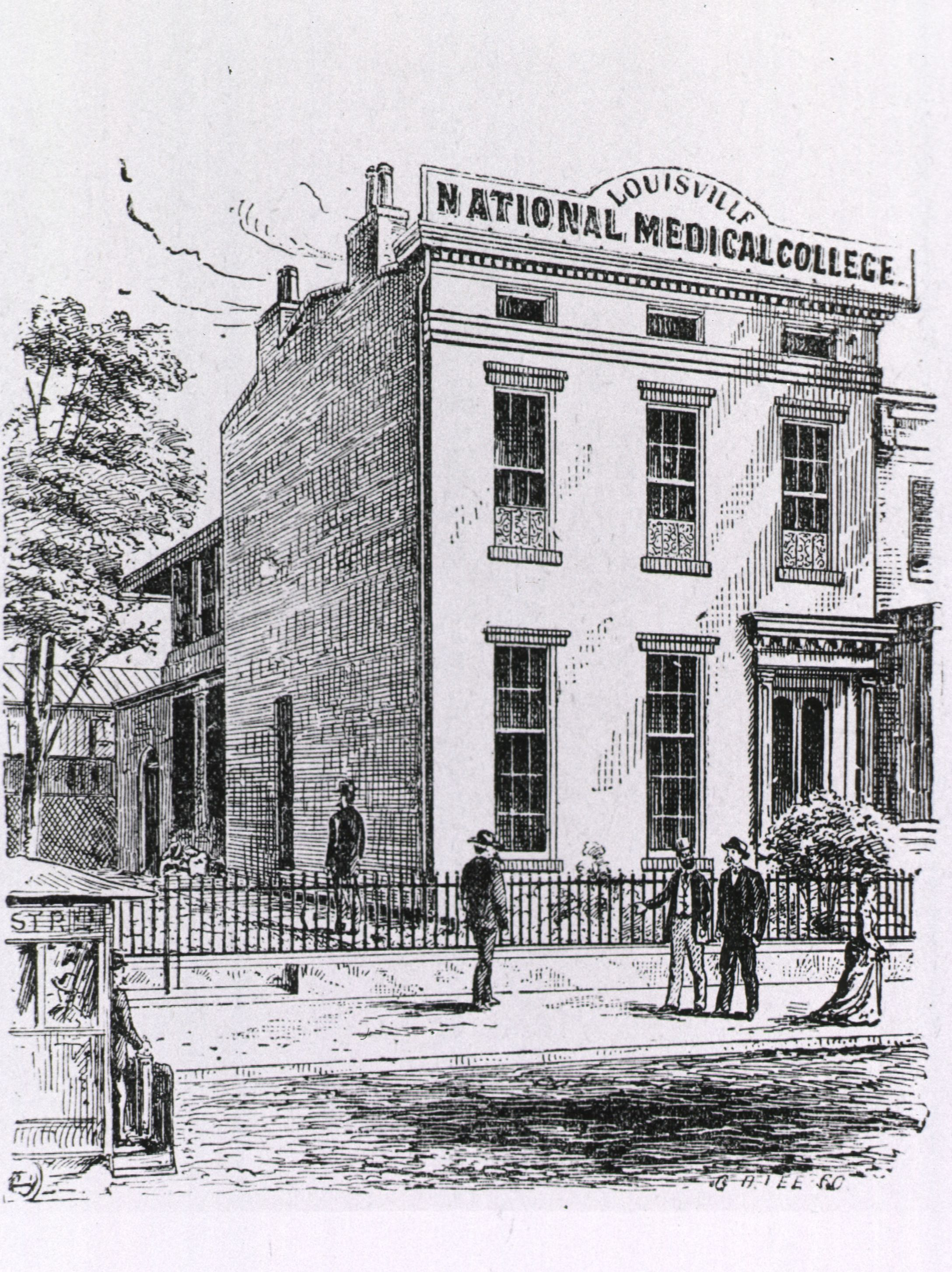
Louisville National Medical College in Louisville, Kentucky. Closed in 1912.

In 1910, Abraham Flexner published "Medical Education in the United States and Canada", a landmark study (known as the Flexner Report) commissioned by the Carnegie Foundation. Flexner was not a doctor, but was considered to be a specialist in education. He visited and evaluated 155 medical schools. He produced his Report at a time when most medical schools were private, for-profit establishments with low standards for admission and graduation. The report reinforced a broader reform trend, driven by a legitimate need to improve education of physicians.

The Flexner Report's title page

The Report called on American medical schools to strengthen admission and graduation standards and to adhere to mainstream scientific principles in their teaching and research. The upshot of Flexner's report was to make medical training more costly as a result of his recommendation that schools integrate expensive laboratories and hospital-based training into the curriculum. However, instead of advocating improvements to existing weak schools and provision of funding to support necessary (and expensive) reforms to their teaching practices, the Report argued that they should be shut down.

Many of the medical schools criticized in the Report closed – within 15 years, 89 of the 155 schools had been shut down, including five of the seven schools serving African-American students. Thus, the toll was particularly high for schools admitting African American students, thereby creating a bottleneck in the production of African American physicians that persisted for over half a century. Specifically, Flexner's Report found that only "Meharry at Nashville and Howard at Washington are worth developing," and those two were the only historically Black medical schools to survive the follow-up to the report.

The report's final chapter devotes two pages to medical education of 'Negroes' and to the nature and scope of their roles as future physicians. Flexner suggested that African American physicians should be well trained, but that their role should be limited to a narrow range of services for African American patients. He argued that African American physicians should not be trained as surgeons or specialists but as "sanitarians" – essentially public health officers focused on hygiene to prevent the spread of disease from Black communities into White ones.

== 1910 to the Civil Rights movement ==
During most of the twentieth century prior to the Civil Rights Movement, the American medical system embodied extreme forms of racism. In the southern states during the Jim Crow era, state laws and social customs mandated the racial segregation of medical societies, medical facilities, and medical education. Hospitals were either racially segregated or no medical services were available for Black populations. Professional associations for medical professionals were not open to African American physicians and many medical schools continued to refuse to admit African American students.

The National Medical Association (NMA) was founded in 1895 by 12 African American doctors in Atlanta, Georgia in order to represent African American physicians, who were excluded from joining the American Medical Association. In the late 1950s, the NMA took a more active interest in civil rights under the leadership of its president, T. R. M. Howard, a surgeon from Mississippi. In 1957, under his leadership, the NMA challenged ongoing hospital segregation in both the North and the South.

Despite these efforts, the situation for African-American students remained dire, with nominally "separate but equal" education being the Supreme Court-ordered model followed by many states, especially in the South. The United States Supreme Court's decision in Missouri ex rel. Gaines v. Canada (1938) held that states that provided a school service for White students had to provide in-state education to African American students as well. States could satisfy this requirement by allowing African American and White students to attend the same schools or by creating a second school for African American students. In handing down this decision, the Supreme Court did not overturn Plessy v. Ferguson or violate the "separate but equal" precedents established under this decision.

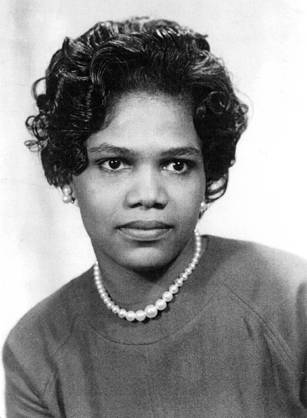
Edith Irby Jones in the 1950s

Cracks were nevertheless starting to show in this discriminatory edifice. In 1948, Edith Irby Jones was the first African American to be accepted as a student at the University of Arkansas for Medical Sciences and the first Black student to attend racially mixed classes in the American South.

In Sweatt v. Painter, 339 U.S. 629 (1950), the US Supreme Court significantly weakened the "separate but equal" doctrine of racial segregation established by Plessy v. Ferguson. The case was influential in the landmark case of Brown v. Board of Education four years later.

Despite preliminary steps to open up education to African American students, their access to medical studies was very limited everywhere in the United States. In 1950, 133 African American students graduated from all US medical schools (including Howard and Meharry), or about 2.4 percent of the 5,553 medical school graduates that year.

== The Civil Rights movement and later changes ==
The mid-20th century saw legal and social shifts that slowly opened doors for African American students to predominantly White institutions. In the 1960s, Civil Rights legislation and pressure from the National Medical Association led to increased recruitment of minority students.

Two more mainly Black Medical Schools were founded during this period:

- The Charles R. Drew University of Medicine and Science was incorporated in California as a private, nonprofit educational institution in 1966 in response to the McCone Commission's recommendations to improve access to healthcare in South Los Angeles following the Watts Riots in 1965.
- In 1975, the Morehouse School of Medicine was created and, in 1978, its first students were admitted to a two-year program in the basic sciences, and then transferred to other medical schools for the clinical years of their training. The institution became independent from Morehouse College in 1981 and was fully accredited to award M.D. degrees in 1985.

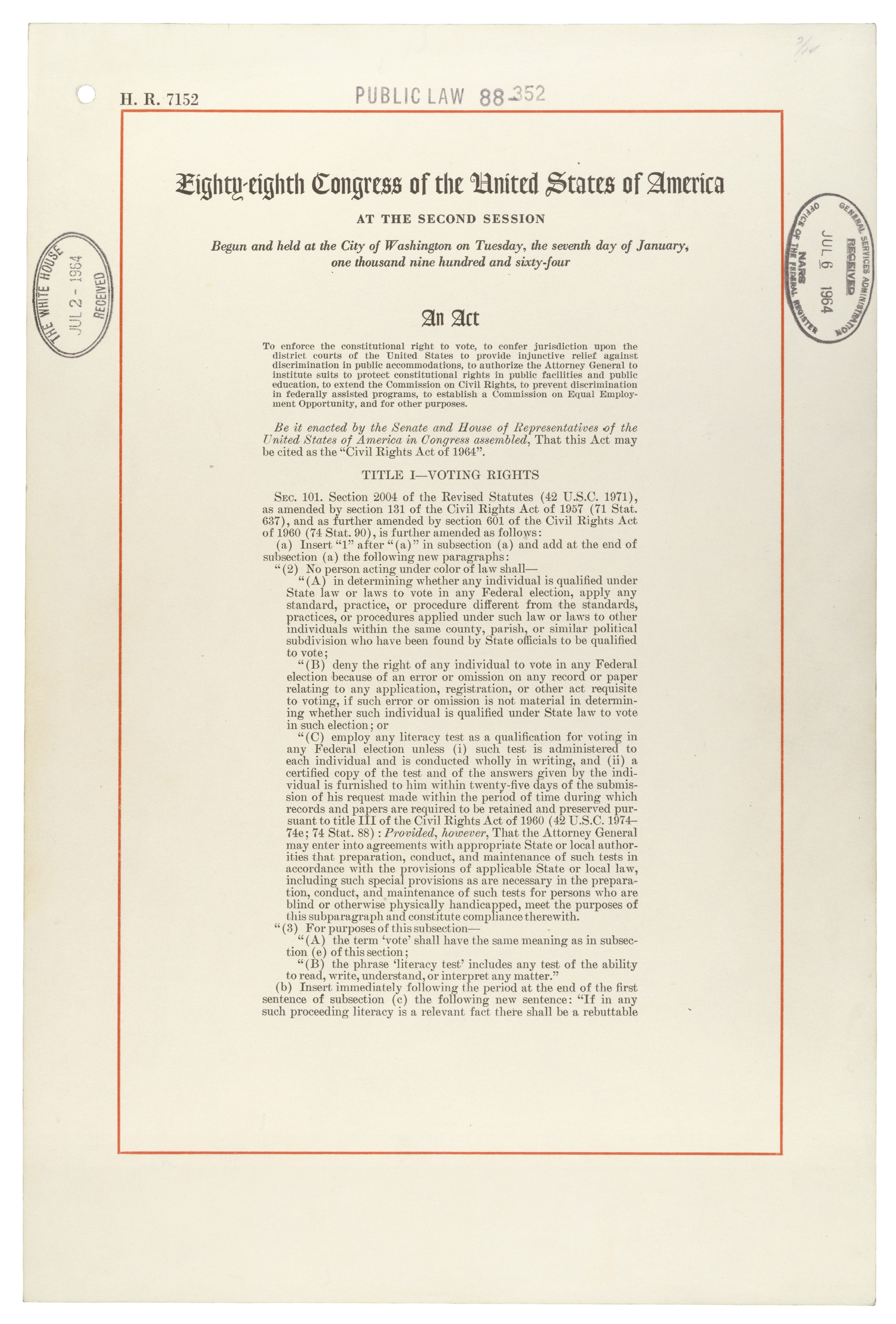
First page of the Civil Rights Act of 1964

In 1961, President John F. Kennedy issued Executive Order 10925 which required government contractors to take "affirmative action to ensure that applicants are employed, and that employees are treated during employment, without regard to their race, creed, color, or national origin." Later expanded, affirmative action's purpose was to pressure institutions into compliance with the nondiscrimination mandate of the Civil Rights Act of 1964. It was believed that this would address historic discrimination against minorities and, for African American populations, would improve health outcomes. Empirical support for improved health outcomes is strong – for example, an econometric study shows large effects on health outcomes of having African American doctors care for African American cardiovascular patients.

Despite these social and legal changes, medical schooling remained, de facto, highly segregated, with most physicians graduating from mainly Black medical schools. By the late 1960s and early 1970s, 83 percent of all African American physicians had been trained at the two historically Black medical schools – Meharry Medical College and Howard University College of Medicine.

== Current Status and Barriers ==
Andrea Campbell, the attorney general of Massachusetts, reacts to Students for Fair Admissions vs Harvard University

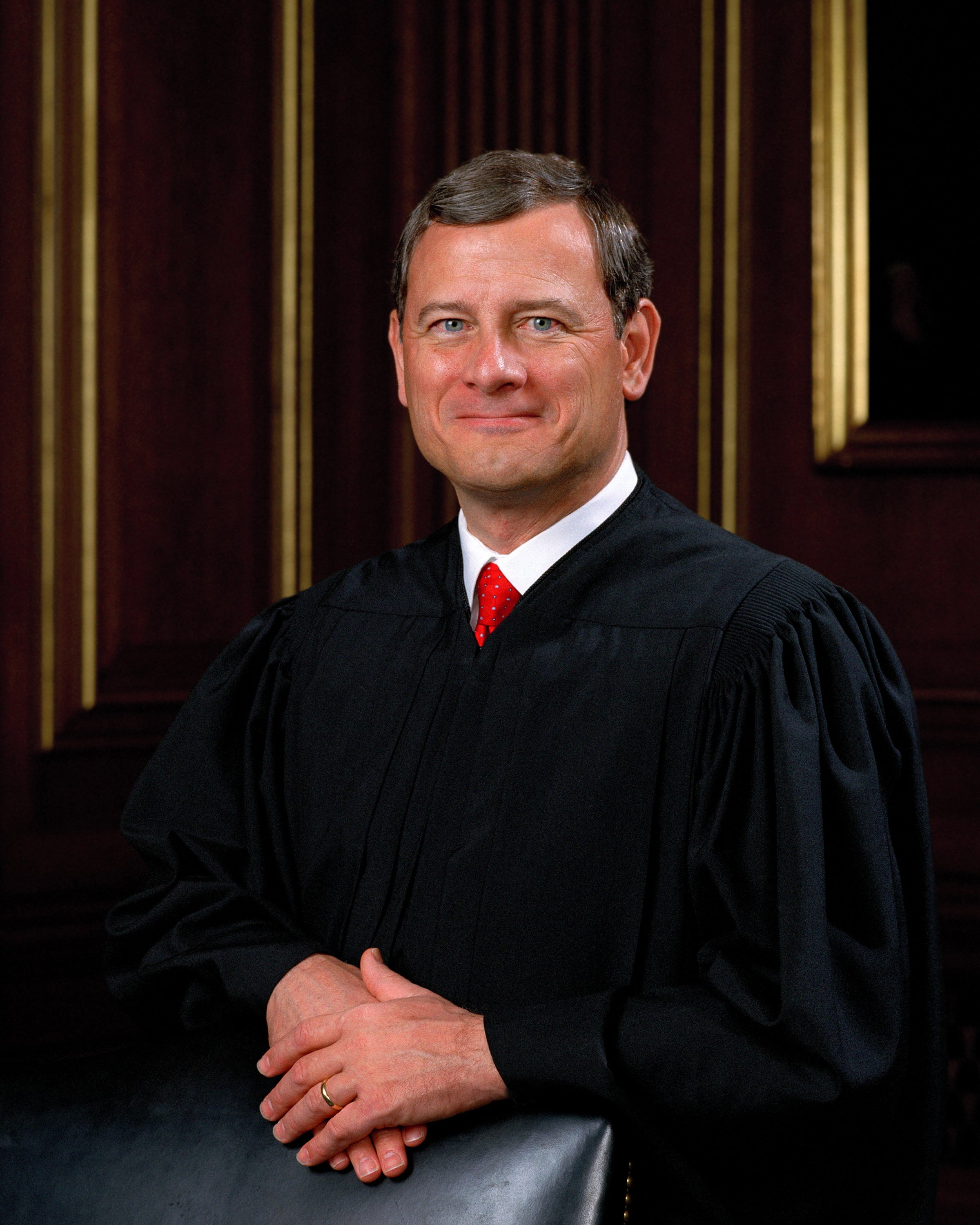
Chief Justice Roberts drafted the Supreme Court's majority decision on Students for Fair Admissions vs Harvard University.

In 2023, the Supreme Court decision in Students for Fair Admissions vs Harvard University effectively overturned affirmative action. Chief Justice Roberts, who drafted the majority opinion, noted that prohibiting the use of race in admissions did not stop universities from considering a student's discussion of how their race had affected their life. This decision has resulted in a significant decrease in the enrollment of minority medical students.

In 1996, voters in the State of California effectively eliminated affirmative action in public medical schools by voting for Proposition 209. A study of minority medical school enrollment in six states with affirmative action bans found a 17 percent decline in minority enrollment.

African Americans remain significantly underrepresented in medicine relative to their percentage of the U.S. population. As of the 2020s, African American physicians make up approximately five percent of all physicians, while African Americans constitute roughly 13-14 percent of the US population. A study of matriculation and persistence of African American medical students notes that they are less likely than White students to apply to medical schools (matriculation) and that they are only half as likely as White students to leave medical school with a degree (persistence). This interview-based study attributes these differences to African American students' relative lack of exposure to people involved in the medical sector and to lack of resources. These were found to be the main factors that significantly lowered both matriculation and persistence. These findings shed light on the long term, cumulative effects of discrimination in medical education.

== See also ==
- Medical education in the United States
- Issues in higher education in the United States
- Physician shortage in the United States
- Medical racism in the United States
- History of public health in the United States
