= Charles H. Epps Jr. =

American orthopaedic surgeon (1930–2026)

Charles Harry Epps, Jr.
- Born: July 24, 1930; Baltimore, Maryland, U.S.
- Died: January 12, 2026 (aged 95)
- Education: Howard University
- Spouse: Roselyn P. Epps
- Scientific career
- Workplaces: Howard University College of Medicine

Charles Harry Epps Jr. (July 24, 1930 – January 12, 2026) was an American orthopaedic surgeon who served as Dean of the Howard University College of Medicine.

== Early life and education ==
Epps was born in Baltimore and grew up in Pimlico. At the age of six he first noticed how unequal his society was, with the separate white school being better equipped than his own. By the age of fifteen, Epps lost his father to a heart attack. He attended Frederick Douglass High School, where he graduated as valedictorian. He was appointed to the Maryland State Boys' State Senate, where he successfully called for the elimination of segregated public transport. He was encouraged by his high school biology teacher to study chemistry at Howard University. He earned his medial degree from Howard University, graduating magna cum laude. In an interview with The Washington Post, Epps said that as a Black medical student in the 1940s he could only study at Howard University or the Meharry Medical College. Throughout his medical degree he drove a taxicab. He specialised in orthopaedic surgery at Freedmen's Hospital, and was only the fifth African-American in history to become an orthopaedic surgeon.

== Research and career ==
After his residency, Epps joined the Medical Corps where he was made a Captain. He was honourably discharged in 1962, and returned to Washington, D.C. to start his own medical practise. Epps was elected President of the American Orthopaedic Association in 1986, and was the first African-American person to hold such a position. In 1988 Epps was made Dean of the Howard University College of Medicine. His leadership resulted in a significant increase in endowment funding as well as several new research chairs.

In 1994 Epps was made chief executive officer of the Howard University Hospital. He was awarded the American Academy of Orthopaedic Surgeons Humanitarian Award in 2000, and the Marymount University Ethics Award in 2003. Epps retired from Howard University College of Medicine in 2001. In 2008 Howard University College of Medicine established the Charles H. Epps, Jr. Chair in Orthopaedic Surgery.

== Personal life and death ==
Epps was married to Roselyn P. Epps, the first African-American President of the American Medical Women's Association and the first African-American and first female president of the District of Columbia Chapter of the American Academy of Pediatrics. Roselyn died in December 2014.

Epps died on January 12, 2026, at the age of 95.

== Selected publications ==
- Epps, C. H. Jr; Bryant, D. D. 3rd; Coles, M. J.; Castro, O. (1991). "Osteomyelitis in patients who have sickle-cell disease. Diagnosis and management". JBJS. 73 (9): 1281–1294. doi:10.2106/00004623-199173090-00002. ISSN 0021-9355.
- Epps, C H; Tooms, R E; Edholm, C D; Kruger, L M; Bryant, D D (1991-07-01). "Failure of centralization of the fibula for congenital longitudinal deficiency of the tibia". The Journal of Bone & Joint Surgery. 73 (6): 858–867. doi:10.2106/00004623-199173060-00008. ISSN 0021-9355. PMID 2071619.
- Epps, C H; Schneider, P L (1989). "Treatment of hemimelias of the lower extremity. Long-term results". The Journal of Bone & Joint Surgery. 71 (2): 273–277. doi:10.2106/00004623-198971020-00015. ISSN 0021-9355. PMID 2918012.
