= Reyburn =

Surname

Reyburn is a surname. Notable people with the surname include:

- Amedee Reyburn (1879–1920), American freestyle swimmer and water polo player who competed in the 1904 Summer Olympics
- John E. Reyburn (1845–1914), Republican member of the U.S. House of Representatives from Pennsylvania
- Robert Reyburn (1810–1892), Scottish born New Zealand orchardist, farmer and politician
- Wallace Reyburn (1913–2001), New Zealand-born humourist author, rugby writer and creator of urban legends
- William S. Reyburn (1882–1946), Republican member of the U.S. House of Representatives from Pennsylvania
