= Celia Maxwell =

- Education: Hunter College; Columbia University
- Scientific career
- Fields: Infectious diseases
- Workplaces: Howard University

Celia Judith Maxwell is an American infectious disease physician and academic administrator. She serves as the co-director of clinical trials and the clinical trials unit at the Howard University College of Medicine.

== Life ==
Maxwell earned a B.S.N. from Hunter College. She graduated with a M.D. from Columbia University College of Physicians and Surgeons. She completed an internal medicine residency at Howard University Hospital and a fellowship in parasitology at in the laboratory of parasitic diseases at National Institutes of Health.

Maxwell researches the immune response of humans in Hookworm infections. She co-chaired the transitional task force on AIDS services formed by Washington, D.C. mayor Sharon Pratt. From 1994 to 1997, Maxwell was a special assistant to David A. Kessler, the commissioner of food and drugs. She was a health legislative assistant for U.S. senator Tom Harkin. She was inducted to the Washington D.C. hall of fame. Maxwell is a professor of medicine in the division of infectious diseases at the Howard University College of Medicine. She formerly served as the associate dean for research and currently serves as co-director of clinical trials and clinical trials unit. In August 2018, she was inducted as a fellow of the Infectious Diseases Society of America. She is a fellow of the American College of Physicians. Maxwell is a member of the scientific advisory board of President's Emergency Plan for AIDS Relief.

== Research ==
Maxwell’s clinical and research work has centered on infectious diseases disproportionately affecting minority populations, including HIV/AIDS and COVID-19, as well as community-based approaches to public health.

During the COVID-19 pandemic, Maxwell worked in Howard University Hospital’s participation in the Novavax vaccine trial, marking the hospital’s first involvement in a major vaccine study.

Beyond her work on COVID-19, Maxwell has been a leading figure in HIV research and education in minority populations. Her work at Howard has contributed to developing infrastructure for future clinical trials addressing health disparities in infectious diseases.
