= Debra Ford =

- Education: Howard University
- Scientific career
- Fields: Colorectal surgery, medical simulation
- Workplaces: Howard University

Debra Holly Ford is an American colorectal surgeon and academic administrator serving as the senior associate dean for academic affairs of Howard University College of Medicine. She is an associate professor of surgery and an expert in surgical education and medical simulation.

== Life ==
Ford is from Pine Bluff, Arkansas. She earned a B.S. in zoology (1982) and M.D. (1986) from Howard University. She was the top-ranking medical student in her class. She completed a surgery residency at Howard University Hospital in 1991. She completed a colon and rectal surgery at the University of Texas Health Science Center at Houston.

In September 1994, Ford joined the faculty at Howard University College of Medicine. She researches surgical education, simulation in health care, and the colon, rectum, and anus. She is an associate professor of surgery and senior associate dean for academic affairs. Ford is the founding medical and surgical director of its health sciences simulation and clinical skills center. She was the program director of the Howard University general surgery residency for thirteen years until 2012. Ford heads the colon and rectal surgery section. She is a fellow of the American Society of Colon and Rectal Surgeons. In 2022, Ford was inducted as a member of the Academy of Master Surgeon Educators of the American College of Surgeons.
