= Lillian Beard =

American physician

Lillian McLean Beard (born 1943), is a pediatrician and has served as a spokesperson for the American Academy of Pediatrics. With the mission of reaching patients within their homes, Beard utilized various forms of mass communication, from magazine publications to television news sources, to reach the homes of innumerable women.

== Early life and education ==
Lillian McLean was born and raised in Brooklyn, New York, Beard decided at an early age to pursue medicine. Living with single mother, Woodie McLean, and a younger sister, McLean was dedicated to her studies from the beginning of her formal education. Traveling two hours each way, Beard was one of five African American students in a class of 1,055 at Midwood High School in New York. After graduating in 1961, Beard attended Howard University where she received a B.S. degree. Applying to attend Howard University College of Medicine. Receiving her M.D. in 1970, Beard graduated in a class of 100 students as one of fifteen women. Beard went on to complete her pediatric internship and residency at Children’s Hospital National Medical Center in 1973.

== Career ==
Beard began her career as a Community Pediatrics Fellow. This position was sponsored by the Program for Learning Studies and the Comprehensive Health Care Program of the Child Health and Development Department at George Washington University in Washington D.C. Beard continued her involvement with Howard University as an assistant professor and joined the teaching staff of George Washington University School of Medicine. In addition to this aspect of Beard's career, she took a very vocal approach to medicine, working as a health expert on Good Morning America, CNN's Health Accent, ABC's Home Show, Fox After Breakfast, and Everyday with Joan Lunden. Utilizing modern forms of communication, Beard began to write advice columns including "Ask the Experts" on yourbabytoday.com and in print in Good Housekeeping's "Ask Beard." Since 1995, Beard has been the national spokesperson for the American Academy of Pediatrics. She is also a fellow of the American Academy of Pediatrics, the National Medical Association, and the American Medical Women's Association. Beard currently works as a practicing pediatrician in Silver Spring, Maryland. She also currently holds the positions of associate clinical professor of pediatrics at George Washington University Medical School and assistant professor at Howard University College of Medicine. Beard has recently published Salt In Your Sock and Other Tried-and-True Home Remedies, a publication that features medically-based holistic treatments

== Honors ==
In 1979 as she was one of ten out of 53,000 nominees named Outstanding Young Women of America. Between 1973 and 2000, Beard won eight Physician Recognition Awards from the American Medical Association. In 1998 Beard won the Global Initiative for Telemedicine Award of Merit. Since then, Beard has won the National Medical Association Hall of Fame award and a multitude of awards from the American Medical Association.
