= Medical racism in the United States =

Discriminatory practices in the U.S.

Medical racism in the United States refers to racial and ethnic disparities in healthcare, including discriminatory medical practices and misrepresentations in medical education. Medical racism is usually driven by biases based on characteristics of patients' race and ethnicity and especially affects vulnerable subgroups such as women, children and the poor. Since the 18th century, examples of medical racism including various unethical studies, forced procedures, and differential treatments administered by health care providers, researchers, and government entities already existed in the United State

Medical racism can stem from explicit prejudice, unconscious bias, or structural racism. There are many factors could contribute to the medical racism in the United State such as the marginalization of minority in the medical field from history to modern era. The historical racial depiction and the lack of medical studies about minority also misled to the medical racial stereotype nowadays. In addition, socioeconomic statues may even escalated the medical racism that has already been existing. Factors above still impacts the experiences of minor races in medical treatment; each minority is still facing different type of medical racism nowadays.

The medical racism in the United States is leading some contemporary issues in the modern society such as the disparities in access to medical resources among minor races. This disparities even become larger during Covid epidemics. Meanwhile, the history of medical racism in the United States also caused the distrust, preference and even resistance towards certain medical treatment. The impact of medical racism on the mental health of youth is particular notable.

For the medical racism in the United States, actions from different aspects in society are taken including alleviation in bias in medical education and training, development of policies and structural reforms in society.

== History ==
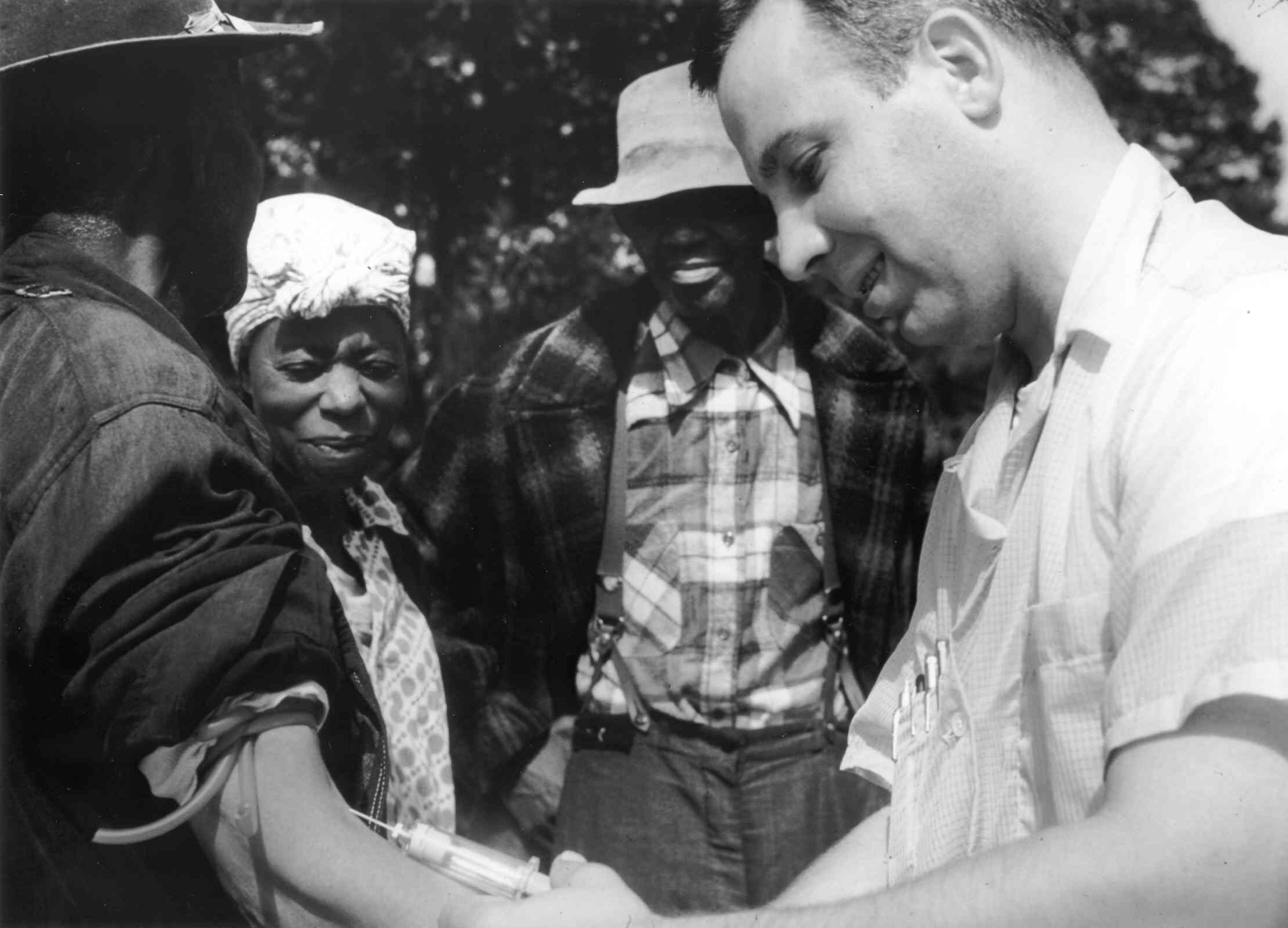
A doctor draws blood from a patient who was unwittingly a test subject in the Tuskegee Study of Untreated Syphilis in the Negro Male. This study is widely condemned for egregious violations of research ethics.

Medical racism has deep historical roots. The concept of "race" was originated in Europe back in 18th century, which was further expanded during colonization in 19th century. The medical racial stereotypes such as the high pain tolerance of Africans, were developed and reinforced by a series of study conducted during that time During the same time, the similar ideas were also generated in the U.S. by misleading studies, for example, during Civil War the lung capacity was incorrectly measured for Black soldiers and led to a wrong conclusion that White soldiers were physically superior as having higher lung capacity

The history of medical racism has also contributed to the distrust of health professionals by many people in marginalized racial and ethnic groups. Studies within the last couple decades have elucidated ongoing disparate treatment from health professionals, revealing racial biases. These racial biases have impacted the way in which treatments such as painkillers are prescribed and the rate at which diagnostic tests are given. Black patients have a long history of receiving contrasting medical treatment based on different perceptions of the pain thresholds of Black people. The eugenics movement is an example of how racial bias affected the treatment of women of color, specifically African American women.

While studies like the Tuskegee Study of Untreated Syphilis in the Negro Male are widely known, there were already similar unethical medical experiment on the African Americans earlier; the infamous example was Dr. J. Marion Sims, as known as "the father of modern gynecology", had conducted the crude medical experiments repeatedly on 3 enslaved women without anesthesia. And the U.S. Public Health Service Sexually Transmitted Disease (STD) Inoculation Study of 1946-1948 harmed Guatemalan prisoners, sex workers, soldiers, and mental health patients by purposely infecting victims with STDs such as syphilis and gonorrhea. Forcible sterilization of Indigenous women as young as 15 years old occurred from 1970 to 1976 by the Indian Health Service Many other examples exist in American history of the unethical actions of health care providers, researchers, and government entities.

Racial minorities have faced constant and significant barriers to entering and advancing in the medical profession. African American medical professionals, in particular, encountered systemic exclusion, discrimination, and limited access to training opportunities. Until 1940, the American Medical Directory—compiled by the American Medical Association—marked Black physicians with a "col." notation, reinforcing professional marginalization and restricting their inclusion in medical institutions, professional organizations, and fair insurance practices. These historical inequities have shaped patient distrust in the healthcare system and limited the diversity of the medical workforce.

== Contributing factors ==
=== Cultural competence ===
Physicians who are not culturally competent can harm patients due to poor relationship dynamics, contributing to medical racism. While physicians may consciously condemn racism and negative stereotypes, evidence shows that doctors exhibit the same levels of implicit bias as the greater population. Racialized minority groups report experiencing both overt and covert racism in healthcare interactions. Implicit bias is also seen in mental health services, Healthcare providers may not consciously have biases on racial stereotypes. These tend to occur automatically. Psychological studies have demonstrated that "...persons who do not see themselves as prejudiced will make health care allocation decisions…". Based on this research, several authors argue that there is an intense need for cultural competence education in healthcare for explicit racism and implicit biases. Cultural incompetence exists for a number of reasons, such as lack of diversity in medical education and lack of diverse members of medical school student and faculty populations. This leads to marginalization of both minority healthcare providers and minority patients.

=== Medical education ===
There is a lack of medical education about minority groups. In a 2016 study, White medical students incorrectly believed that Black patients had a higher pain tolerance than White patients. These beliefs were rooted in unfounded notions, such as thicker skin or less sensitive nerve endings in Black individuals, echoing racist ideologies. Minority patients report feeling unjustly reprimanded and scolded by healthcare staff, as noted by African American women. Furthermore, research reveals disparities in pain medication prescriptions, with White male physicians prescribing less to Black patients, fueled by perceptions of biological differences in pain reactions between races. African Americans are disproportionately subjected to less desirable healthcare services, like limb amputations, highlighting systemic inequalities. In medical schools in the US, within assigned textbook readings, there exists a disparity between the representation of race and skin color in textbook case studies relative to the US population. This is true for both visual and textual lecture materials.

A group of studies done on the representation of race and gender in course slides for the University of Washington School of Medicine, preclinical lecture slides at the Warren Alpert Medical School of Brown University and case studies used at the University of Minnesota Medical School simultaneously showed associations of race as a "risk factor" and a lack of racial diversity.

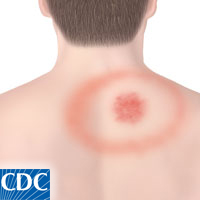
In this image is one of the first symptoms of lyme disease, erythema migrans, depicted on white skin. Without more diverse depictions, this rash may be harder to detect on those with darker skin tones.

The study done on the University of Minnesota Medical School employed the use of the concept of hidden curriculum to describe the ways in which lack of representation and informal teachings can greatly influence the minds of aspiring physicians. The interactions had between students and faculty or the transmission of unintentional messages can be just as, if not more, influential than formal lectures. These can include the associations of diseases such as sickle cell anemia as a "black disease" and cystic fibrosis as a "white disease" which leads to poor health outcomes. In this study, the 1996-1998 year one and year two curriculums of the school were analyzed. It revealed that only 4.5% of the case studies mentioned a racial or ethnic background of the patient and when the patient was black or had "potentially unfavorable characteristics" race or ethnicity was more likely to be identified. There was also a greater prevalence of health-related themes discussed when race or ethnicity was identified. Researchers determined that the inclusion of specific racial or ethnic identities in those cases was intended to indicate something about that disease or health condition. The authors state that practices such as these contribute to the racialization of diseases.

A study of medical textbooks has also yielded information on minority representation in medical teachings. Based on the required texts of the top 20 ranked medical schools in North America, US editions of Atlas of Human Anatomy (2014), Bates' Guide to Physical Examination and History Taking (2013), Clinically Oriented Anatomy (2014), and Gray's Anatomy for Students (2015) were chosen for the study. Using the total 4146 images from the four textbooks that depicted visible faces, arms, heads, and skin, researchers discovered two of three books were close in diversity to the US population, one book displayed "diversity on basis of equal representation" and one matched neither definition of diversity. On a topic level there were also issues of diversity. When discussing health issues such as skin cancers three of four books included no imagery at all and the one book that did had only imagery of white and light-skinned patients. According to researchers, symptoms might manifest differently depending on skin tone. Missed indicators may go unreported if there is a lack of education on how to recognize these discrepancies.

Some medical students have also done their own research and added to the discourse on underrepresentation in medical school education. They've noted specific examples such as skin infections like erythema migrans being depicted on almost exclusively white skin. As an indicative first symptom of lyme disease, a lack of knowledge on how to detect this rash on patients with darker skin colors means failed diagnoses of the disease. Studies have shown that there is in fact a delay in lyme disease diagnoses for black patients. The lack of representation in medical school lectures risks creating adverse impacts on the health outcomes of minority populations in the US.

=== Representation in the profession of medicine ===
According to US Census data, Black and Hispanic people account for 13% and 18% of the overall population, respectively. However, they only make up 6% and 5% of medical school graduates, respectively. Black physicians make up only about 3% of American doctors. Black physicians have historically faced numerous obstacles to obtaining membership in the larger medical community. During the 20th century in the United States, groups such as the American Medical Association neglected Black physicians. This has led to continued marginalization of Black physicians in the US due to their small numbers among other factors and this contributes to the marginalization of Black patients. Minorities often perceive medical facilities as "white spaces" because of a lack of diversity at the institutional level.

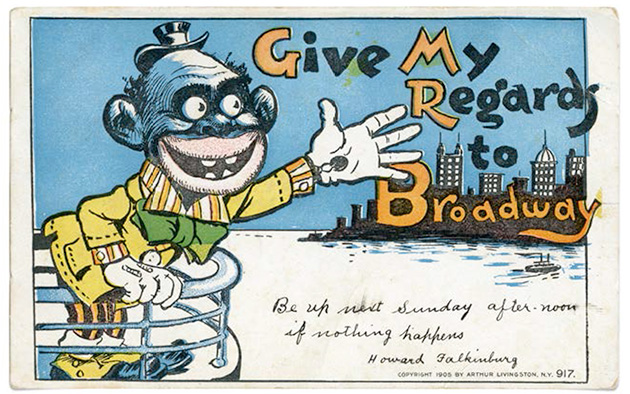
In this postcard, a Jim Crow caricature resembling an ape proclaims "Give My Regards to Broadway." This type of depiction of black people was once common in American history.

=== Racial depictions ===
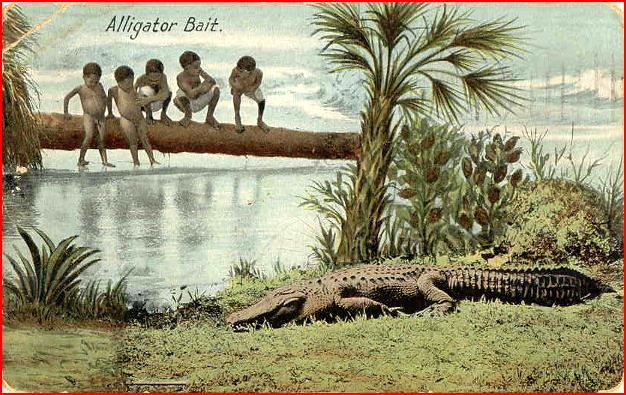
In an early 20th-century postcard, black children are described as "Alligator Bait" as they sit in a tree above an alligator. Images such as these, popular with Americans, helped to contribute to dehumanizing black Americans.

Disparities can also be due to perceptions, by physicians, of pain tolerance and cooperation – aspects of medical racism. Social Darwinism has been utilized to justify Slavery in the United States among other historical practices and the racist ideas about Black people that it created persisted into the 20th century. The Three-Fifths Compromise also reinforced the notion that Black people were less than human.

However, this has not just been relegated to the past. As recently as the 1990s, California state police came under fire for referring to cases involving young Black men as "N.H.I" or "no humans involved." One police officer involved in the Rodney King beating in 1991 was cited as saying that a domestic quarrel between a Black couple was "something right out of Gorillas in the Mist." This comparison mirrors early theories about the evolution of primates. Proponents of this social Darwinistic theory believe that White people are the most advanced humans, descended from primates, and that Black people must fall somewhere in the middle of the two.

Research published in 2008 studied undergraduate students from two universities in the United States. The researchers attempted to determine whether or not the association of Black people with apes influenced the perceptions and behaviors of 242 White and non-white students, using a format in which images were presented to the subjects subliminally and their responses were recorded. The study found that even without explicit knowledge of the historical association, the students implicitly related one with the other. This study was done in the context of criminal justice and aimed to reveal whether associations with animals impacted the likelihood of jurors to give the death sentence. Researchers were able to conclude that, "The present research foregrounds dehumanization as a factor in producing implicit racial bias, and we associate it with deadly outcomes."

However, the racial medical stereotype does not just happen on the African Americans. In the history, American Indians was described as "weak will" which can not resist the alcohol and more susceptible to the alcohol in the health; many in the medical field believed during that time that American Indians did not develop the strong immunity as White people in the evolution when it was discussed about higher fatality of American Indians from tuberculosis. In a study in 2014, majority of nursing and medical students who participated in the survey, were tended to associate American Indian patients and Hispanic patients with certain medical stereotypes such as risky health behavior and language barrier

The racial medical stereotype had also been generated towards in Asian immigrants. One typical example was Page Act in 1875 to forbidden the immigration of Chinese women because they were described as "promiscuous" and "spread out sexual disease". The act laid the foundation for the Chinese Exclusion Act in 1882 later on. Nowadays, Asian immigrants are often described as "model minority" in the United states, which made the Asian immigrants who struggled with economy and health need less likely to be noticed and brought up by the public.

=== Socioeconomic status ===
Studies also show that social class is critical to the effects of racial disparities in health care, due to the correlation and relationship between health status and health insurance or the absence of. There was an interview study of 60 African Americans whom of which had one or multiple illnesses and the results showed that those of whom fell under the low-income category expressed more dissatisfaction with their health care than their fellow middle-income respondents. Socioeconomic status is very entangled and highly associated with racism, which thus restricts many members of minority groups in various ways. Low SES (socioeconomic status) is an important determinant to quality and access of health care because people with lower incomes are more likely to be uninsured, have poorer quality of health care, and or seek health care less often, resulting in unconscious biases throughout the medical field.

A recent study at the Institute of Medicine reported that Whites are more likely than African Americans to receive a broader range of medical specific procedures while African Americans are more likely to receive undesirable procedures such as amputations and not as many options. Of the study, respondents reflected their socioeconomic status, their professions, if they were homeowners, if they had medical insurance, versus those who lived in public housing, had no medical insurance, etc. The study showed that SES directly correlated with health insurance status due to the fact that people that considered themselves as low-income, had a history of either being a Medicaid recipient or had no health insurance overall.

Discrimination based on race is among those of who fall into a minority category, especially being of low-income due to the fact that medical practitioners tend to have more racial biases towards people of color.

=== Implicit bias ===
Implicit bias refers to unconscious attitudes or stereotypes that influence an individual's decisions and actions without their awareness, and thought to contribute to disparities. In healthcare, implicit racial and ethnic biases can contribute to disparities in access to care, quality of care, and health outcomes for people of color.

A systematic review conducted by Hall et al. (2015) examined implicit racial and ethnic biases among healthcare professionals and their impact on healthcare outcomes. The review analyzed 15 studies, most of which used the Implicit Association Test (IAT) to assess implicit bias. The IAT measures implicit biases by assessing the strength of automatic associations between concepts (e.g., racial groups, genders) and attributes (e.g., good, bad). Participants quickly categorize words or images by pressing keys, with the test assuming that stronger associations result in faster, more accurate responses when related concepts share the same key. The results indicated that healthcare professionals generally exhibited low to moderate levels of implicit bias, with attitudes similar to those in the general population. Notably, levels of bias against Black, Hispanic/Latino/Latina, and dark-skinned individuals were relatively similar.

While some associations between implicit bias and healthcare outcomes were nonsignificant, the review found that implicit bias was significantly related to patient-provider interactions, treatment decisions, treatment adherence, and patient health outcomes. These findings highlight the potential influence of implicit bias on the quality of care received by patients of color.

The review calls for further research to employ more rigorous methods to explore the relationships between implicit bias and healthcare outcomes. It also stresses the need for interventions to address implicit bias among healthcare professionals as a means of reducing health disparities.

== Patient experiences ==
Racial discrimination in healthcare is a systemic issue that has persisted across generations, shaping patient outcomes, provider interactions, and institutional policies. Studies show that marginalized racial and ethnic groups frequently experience disparities in treatment due to implicit bias, stereotyping, and structural inequities within the healthcare system. Factors such as income, education, and geographic location further influence the severity of these disparities, contributing to unequal access to quality care.

Patients from historically marginalized communities have reported that healthcare providers often make assumptions about their background, leading to dismissive attitudes and differences in treatment. Research indicates that racial and ethnic minorities are more likely to receive inadequate pain management, face longer wait times, and have their concerns downplayed or ignored compared to White patients. The assumption that patients of certain racial backgrounds are less educated or financially unstable has been cited as a factor in healthcare providers offering lower-quality care or reduced options for treatment. One participant in a study described how assumptions about their cultural background influenced their provider's approach:

"I've had both positive and negative experiences. I know the negative one was based on race. It was [with] a previous primary care physician when I discovered I had diabetes. He said, 'I need to write this prescription for these pills, but you'll never take them and you'll come back and tell me you're still eating pig's feet and everything… Then why do I still need to write this prescription?' And I'm like, 'I don't eat pig's feet.'" (African American participant)

These persistent disparities continue to affect patient trust in the healthcare system but also reinforce the inequities in health outcomes, reinforcing cycles of medical racism for marginalized communities.

Meanwhile the history and previous experience of medical racism also influence the preference of the minority in medical treatment. For example, previous studies show the minority show more resistant toward invasive surgery compare to Whites in the U.S. The minority groups are more likely to be concerned or think about the existence of medical racism and lower-quality health care for the minority; therefore they would more likely to refuse the medical treatment

== Black Americans ==
Black Americans have faced numerous obstacles to equal access to healthcare due to medical racism and the consequence of this has been poor health outcomes. Within this paradigm, American doctors and institutions have perpetuated scientific racism, denied equal care to Black patients, perpetuated structural violence and committed acts of physical assault and violence against Black people in the context of medical experimentation, withholding of treatment, medical procedures performed without consent, and surgical procedures performed without anesthesia

False claims about Black people's relationship to primates and their biological and intellectual inferiority to White people, in the US, were just a few ways in which chattel slavery was justified. One widely circulated magazine in the American South published an article by a physician claiming that the act of running away from slavery was a form of mental illness he called drapetomania. Following this was the introduction of the belief that Black people have much higher pain thresholds or the introduction of the belief that they do not feel pain at all. Proponents of ideas such as this also proposed that black people had thicker skulls and less sensitive nervous systems, and they also proposed that Black people contracted diseases which were linked to their darker skin color. Some proponents of these racist ideas even believed that Black people could go through surgery without any pain medicine and they also believed that when Black people were punished, during their enslavement, they felt no pain. White American physicians also operated on the assumption that poor health was the status quo for Black people which meant that they would naturally die off due to syphilis and tuberculosis, a situation which was detrimental to the quality of the healthcare which they then provided to Black people. The high rate of syphilis among Black people was used to reinforce this notion. However, racial myths also have negative impacts on the health outcomes of Black Americans, starting from infancy. Beliefs in the "supernormal health" of Black babies and children foster ignorance and lead to neglect of Black children's health issues. With a large role in the perpetuation of such widely believed ideas, oral traditions can be highly influential, even when they are not explicitly included within medical curricula.

False beliefs of pain tolerance based on a patient's race lead to detrimental consequences even if those who hold such beliefs have no explicitly prejudiced beliefs, as was discovered in a study on racial bias in pain assessments. In this study, a correlation between racial bias in pain assessment and subsequent pain treatment suggestions was found. It was also found that a significant number of laypersons and those with medical training held incorrect beliefs about biological differences between Black and White people. Beliefs such as these can lead to the differential treatment of patients on the basis of their race. Staton et al., showed that physicians were likely to underestimating the pain intensity that Black patients were feeling. In the early 2000s, multiple studies demonstrated discrepancies in the pain treatment of Black patients as compared to White patients. From children to adults, differences were as much as Black patients only taking half of the amount of pain medications as White patients were taking.

Freedom from slavery did not stop the impacts that slavery had on Black people: the denial of access to healthcare recreated the experiences of slavery by exposing Black people to many infectious diseases. A notable difference between the services which were offered and rendered to Black patients and the services which were offered and rendered to White patients has been observed in the American healthcare system even with the presentation of the same severity of symptoms and the same health insurance.

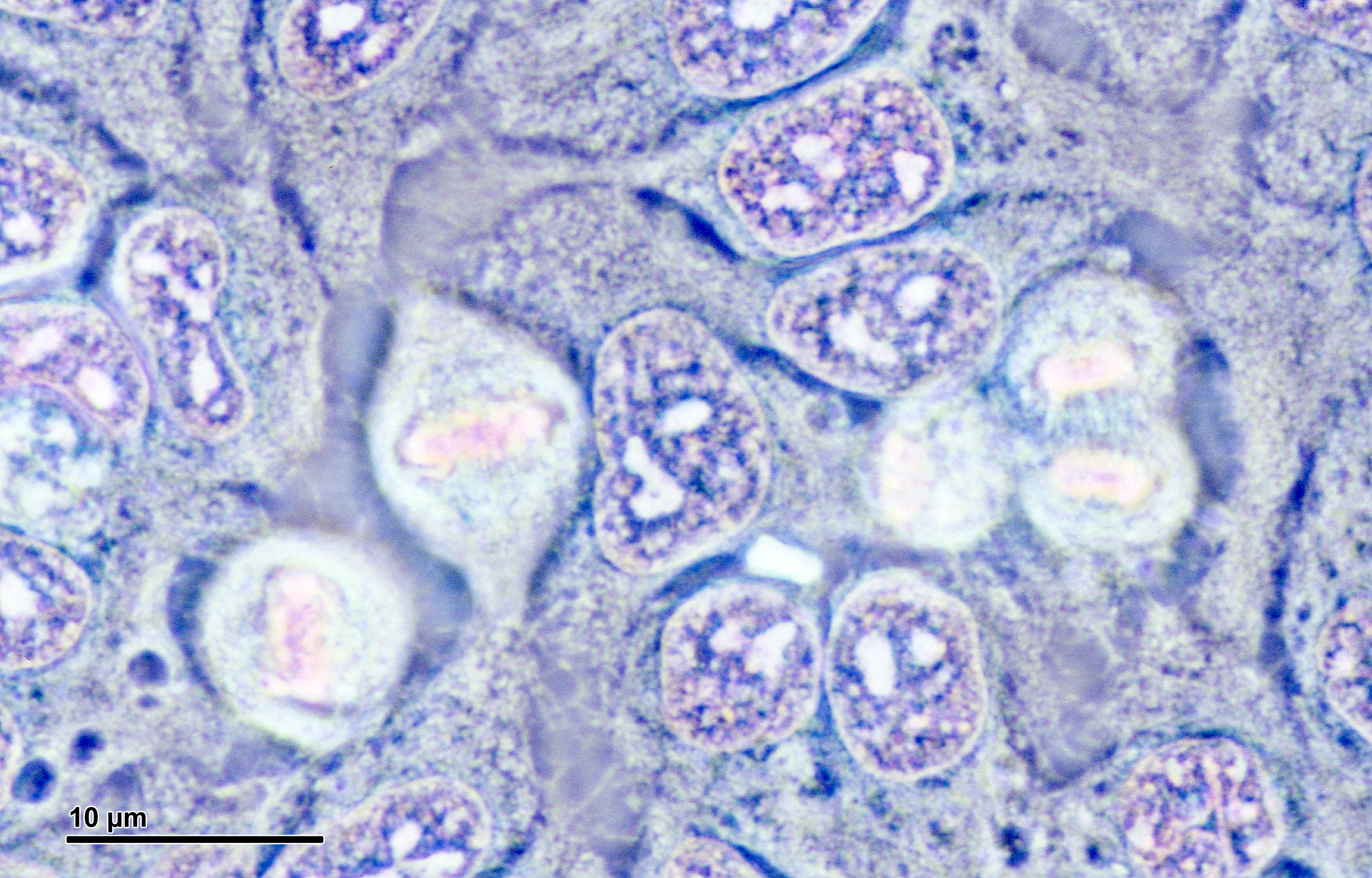
This photo shows "HeLa cells" that originated from Black woman and cancer patient, Henrietta Lacks. Lacks was unaware of her stolen cells that have been used for many decades in medical advancements such as the development of the polio vaccine.

Along with unequal access to medical care, medical racism has contributed to violence against Black Americans throughout history. Including the use of "resurrectionists" to retrieve newly buried bodies of deceased Black people for medical study use, the bodies of Black people were abused for forced medical experimentation for many years. As noted in writings on the American medical field's history of medical racism, "American medical education relied on the theft, dissection, and display of bodies, many of whom were Black." This is especially true for women, such as was the case for Henrietta Lacks. The nonconsensual experimentation on enslaved Black women was used to help further the field of gynecology. Following this, due to the history of eugenics in the United States, this same population once again fell victim to forced procedures, in this case sterilization. This went on in the US as late as the 1970s and 1980s as is documented in Killing the Black Body. For Black Americans, the involuntary sterilization of Black women was so well known it began being referred to as the "Mississippi Appendectomy".

The violence which was perpetrated by American physicians and institutions has a long, documented history. Besides the Tuskegee syphilis study, there are many other instances of experimentation on Black populations without their knowledge or consent. In 1951, the US Army intentionally exposed large numbers of Black citizens to Aspergillus fumigatus to ascertain whether they were more susceptible to this fungus. In the same year, Black workers at a Norfolk supply center in Virginia were exposed to crates contaminated with the same fungus. Journalist Richard Sanders reported that from 1956 to 1958 the US Army intentionally released mosquitoes in poor Black communities of Savannah, Georgia and Avon Park, Florida. Many people subsequently developed fevers for unknown reasons and some of them died, it is theorized that the mosquitoes were infected with a strain of yellow fever. Pulitzer-prize winning author of The Plutonium Files, Eileen Welsome described how the US secretly injected thousands of unaware Americans with plutonium while it was developing the atomic bomb. A number of these victims were Black.

In addition, chronic stress has a huge impact on health outcomes- with Black women much more likely to experience this during pregnancy. This process can be referred to as "weathering". It demonstrates that racism leads to health deteriorating over time. Instead of the body only going through pregnancy, lifetime stressors from discrimination and economic inequality makes the already-strained body reach its limit. The physiological impact means a huge increase in pregnancy related health crises. Stress contributes premature birth, hypertension, and delivery complications. This directly contributes to Black maternal death. Maternal mortality in the United States is extremely high compared to other developed countries. This discrepancy has been attributed to the fact that different races are not treated the same. In the United States, Black women are three to four times more likely than White women to die because of pregnancy-related issues. It has been found that income levels can impact a woman's likelihood of dying due to pregnancy related complications. With the income gap between White and Black Americans, this leaves Black women at a higher risk of experiencing maternal mortality.

== Indigenous Americans ==
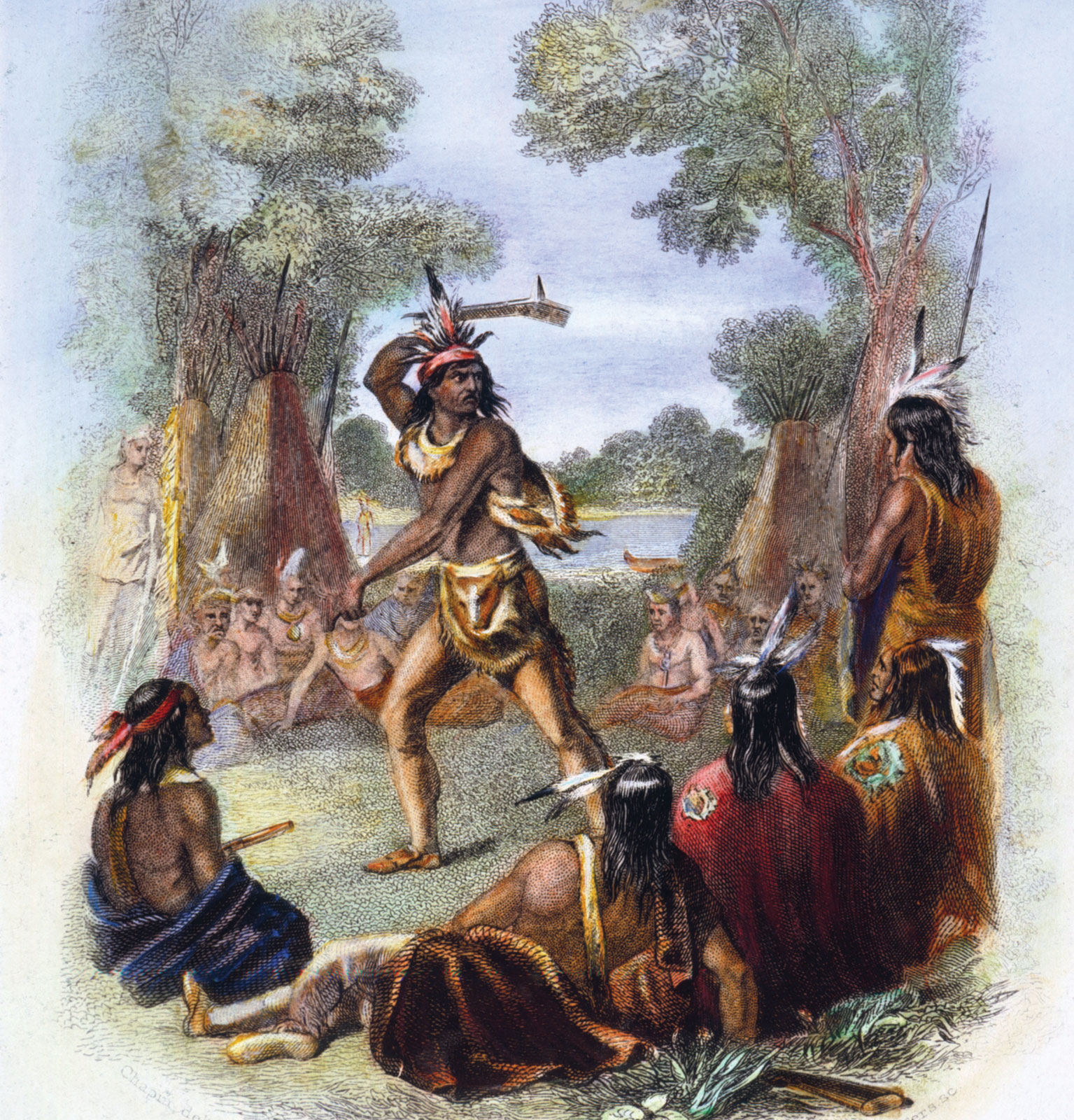
Depicted is war chief Pontiac holding a war hatchet. It was in Pontiac's War that Jeffery Amherst famously proposed gifting smallpox infected blankets to the indigenous peoples.

Starting in the 18th century, the United States has committed many acts of medical injustice against Indigenous Americans. In the 18th century, smallpox was used as a biological weapon to wipe out indigenous populations. In particular, in 1763 Sir Jeffery Amherst ordered soldiers to take the blankets and handkerchiefs of smallpox patients and gift them to indigenous people of Delaware at a peacemaking parley. There is also the prevalence of involuntary sterilization of young indigenous girls and women. From the data yielded by multiple studies, it was suggested that the Indian Health Service sterilized between 25 and 50% of indigenous women from 1970 to 1976.

Contemporarily, the health outcomes of indigenous populations in the US are still vastly worse than the greater population. In the state of Montana, the life expectancy for indigenous women is 62, while for men it is 56. These numbers are significantly lower than the national averages by around 20 years. This is due to a number of factors such as the fact that unequal funding plagues the Indian Health Service that is in charge of ensuring the access the federal government must provide and that around 25% of indigenous people in the US report facing discrimination in medical settings. An executive director at South Dakota Urban Indian Health, Donna Keeler, explains that while her clinic receives federal funding for indigenous people living in urban areas, federal prison inmates would have more federal funding allocated to their healthcare.

== Hispanic Americans ==
The document shown is the results of a 2010 inquiry into the STD research that took place by the US in Guatemala. President Barack Obama enlisted the Presidential Commission for the Study of Bioethical Issues to oversee the project.

In the United States, 20% of Hispanic Americans report encountering discrimination in healthcare settings and 17% report avoiding seeking medical care due to expected discrimination. Studies of Hispanic people living in the U.S. reveal that after experiencing an instance of discrimination in a healthcare setting they, afterward, delayed seeking medical treatment again. The discrimination faced by Hispanic Americans can further contribute to the negative health outcomes that stem from the experience of racism and discrimination by minorities. Cultural incompetency can hinder productive relationships between healthcare providers and patients because different cultural norms of communication can give the impression that a physician is not properly attending to the concerns of their patient as was found in studies on Latina experiences with the healthcare system. It was found in one study that in the role that communication plays in the dynamic between Latina patients and healthcare providers, the way women perceived their communication with their provider was greatly impactful to their perception of discrimination.

The aforementioned U.S. Public Health Service Sexually Transmitted Disease (STD) Inoculation Study of 1946-1948 is just one historical example of the way in which Latin American populations have been victim to medical racism and medical injustices.

== Asian Americans ==
Asian Americans represent a diverse group with ancestry from East Asia, South Asia, and Southeast Asia, including Pacific Islanders and Native Hawaiians. Despite their diversity, Asian Americans often face unique structural and cultural barriers in healthcare due to high immigrant representation—nearly two-thirds of the population is foreign-born, with many having arrived in the past decade. A study in 2019 shows that 13% of Asian Americans report that they have experienced racism during medical treatment, as a result, Asian Americans show more likely to avoid health care compare to the Whites. Another study in 2023 shows that about one third of Asian American women report the experience of the medical racism in the past

Barriers such as limited English proficiency, lack of employer-sponsored insurance, and residency restrictions for Medicaid eligibility contribute to unequal access to healthcare services. The Asian American women reported the medical racism type in various way, which discrimination often related to their language, culture and orientation; it is most common that Asian American women are discriminated due to the type of medical insurance. These systemic factors, combined with underrepresentation in health data, can obscure or minimize disparities in health outcomes for Asian American populations. For example, while overall cancer rates are lower in Asian Americans compared to non-Hispanic Whites, certain subgroups face heightened risks—Filipino men, for instance, have a 15.8% prevalence of type 2 diabetes compared to 7.2% in non-Hispanic Whites. The medical racism that Asian Americans experience might potentially influence their health situation, for example, Asian American women who have experienced the discrimination in health care often performance more poorly in both mental heath and physical health.

Cultural stigmas surrounding mental health, cancer, and trauma can also discourage Asian Americans from seeking care. The "model minority" myth—portraying Asian Americans as universally successful and self-reliant—further undermines the visibility of healthcare disparities and reinforces systemic neglect of this group's specific health needs. Although Asian Americans make up about 17% of U.S. physicians, they remain underrepresented in healthcare leadership roles, limiting their influence in addressing inequities through policy and institutional change.

== Contemporary issues ==
Racial and ethnic disparities in healthcare persist due to systemic factors that influence access to quality care. Structural differences in healthcare funding, policy, and delivery disproportionately impact minority communities, leading to disparities in treatment quality and health outcomes. These barriers, including historical policies and unequal resource distribution, have contributed to ongoing gaps in healthcare access and outcomes.

Between 2006 and 2013, California prisons performed illegal sterilizations on inmates and more than half of the women were Black or Latina. In 2020, a nurse whistleblower alleged the practice of forced hysterectomies at a US Immigration and Customs Enforcement facility. Additionally, studies have shown that Black and Hispanic patients continue to be under-treated for pain compared to their White counterparts.

Structural inequities in healthcare policy continue to affect access to care. Safety-net hospitals and clinics, which often serve racially and ethnically diverse populations, may be under-resourced, which has been associated with lower patient satisfaction, limited performance on evidence-based care measures, and higher rates of safety-related incidents. While the Affordable Care Act expanded healthcare coverage, it did not fully eliminate racial disparities in access. Its reliance on private insurance continues to leave some minority populations uninsured or underinsured, potentially affecting their access to timely and adequate care.

Low Medicaid reimbursement rates can discourage provider participation, as many lawsuits argue it contributes to disparities in healthcare access. Additionally, government pay-for-performance programs can inadvertently penalize safety-net providers, further exacerbating healthcare disparities rather than addressing them. The closure of nonprofit and public hospitals in minority communities has also contributed to physician shortages, forcing many patients to rely on emergency departments for primary care, adding to existing challenges.

Another factor that can cause the disparities in health services for minority groups is health insurance copay. Even with consideration of difference in economy, the disparities in health insurance copay for different race are still considered as existing, which limits the access or choice for certain minority groups to the needed health services or prescription.

=== COVID-19 ===
The disparity in economy, legal status and education have already been existed among different minority group, which influence the health situation of each minority group before and had been exacerbated during COVID-19 . For example, statue of illegal immigrants might result in less health support from government. The poor financial situation might prevent individuals from accessing medical system. During the COVID-19 epidemic, the minor races often showed higher fatality compares to the white, the factors are often pointed out as accumulating disparities in housing, education and health care among different races; examples such as marginalization of communities, overcrowded living conditions and lack of public transportations made people from certain races' communities easier to expose to the virus and harder to access the medical resources once infected. In addition, the survey shows the minority in the U.S. is more likely to show hesitation toward covid-19 vaccine, as they considered about historical medical mistreatment and their own experience. Members of these minority groups had been educated on the poor treatment of their own communities in the past by medical professionals, and expressed skepticism about the vaccine for COVID-19. Members of racialised minority groups had increased exposure to COVID-19 and presented with worse symptoms that factored into higher hospitalization and death rates within these communities. The unequal medical treatment received by those in minority communities created worse outcomes for those individuals.

The problem of medical racism became prominent during the pandemic. According to the survey conducted by American Medical Association in 2020, about one fifth of minority doctors reported as receiving disrespect and discrimination from patients. Among all the races, Black doctors had the highest rate to report as in scarce of medical resources or financial support and almost all minority doctors reported as more likely to receive the patients who struggle with social or economic support compare to White doctor

During the COVID-19 pandemic, a historically developed distrust towards the U.S. medical establishment fostered hesitancy and resistance among Black people towards COVID vaccination, and towards the specific ‘pushing’ of Black people to take the vaccine for example through a $15 million grant from the Bill & Melinda Gates Foundation given to eight historically black colleges and universities in the U.S. to support COVID testing efforts in Black communities. Mass media in the US however, according to Melina Abdullah, professor of Pan-African Studies at California State University, Los Angeles and cofounder of Black Lives Matter-Los Angeles, tended to ignore that historical background and to bluntly “almost indict Black people” for their COVID vaccine hesitancy and resistance.

=== Impact on Youth ===
Racism in the healthcare setting can also have an impact on children and adolescents. Events that occur during childhood and adolescence can have large impacts on individuals for years to come. Youth more commonly report discrimination having an impact on their mental health but it can also impact their physical health. Some of the physical health impacts found in children that experienced racism were increased inflammation, body mass index, cortisol levels, and somatic symptoms. Having these issues as a child can follow these individuals into adulthood and continue to have impacts on their physical and/or mental health. Mental health decreases in children that experience racism are common as well. Depression or depressive thoughts is the most common mental health impact seen in these adolescents. This level of depression can lead to various issues if not addressed.

Another instance of the impact on youth focuses on disabled children. Children with disabilities that are Black, Native American, or Latino are disproportionally impacted by medical racism. Medical needs are increased in people with disabilities and race plays a role in the treatment these patients receive. It has been shown that Black and Latino children with disabilities have higher risk ratios for poor health comes than could be caused by disability alone.

== Mitigation ==
In addressing medical racism in the United States, there are several strategies to mitigate unconscious bias that contributes to health disparities. Practices like better diversity training, epistemic humility and a full commitment to changing the culture of healthcare and the impact of stereotypes can work to lessen the effects that unconscious bias can have on patients. Medical schools also play a role in helping students recognize and address race-based inequities and microaggressions. Curricula that specifically address racial bias can improve patient interactions by preparing incoming healthcare professionals to better navigate these challenges. A 2020 study of resident-led programs dedicated to racism training showed positive results in promoting awareness of racism in the workplace, with the goal of generating early awareness of institutional racism and reducing its negative effects.

One approach that has proven effective is Health Equity Rounds (HER), a longitudinal, case-based conference series designed to address bias, structural racism, and other forms of systemic oppression in healthcare. HER aims to explore root causes of adverse events, with a particular focus on inequities in care delivery, outcomes, and experiences. It also works to normalize conversations about medical racism and catalyze institutional changes. At Boston Medical Center (BMC), the HER model has been implemented successfully since 2016, involving over 68 residents and 9 faculty mentors in 36 grand rounds conferences. HER has helped foster dialogue on medical racism, resulting in both policy changes at the institutional level and broader engagement in state and national advocacy efforts.

Medical racism shapes the communities of colors experience in healthcare in the United States. Due to long standing beliefs that there are biological differences between races, patients of color are usually less likely to receive the necessary pain management treatment compared to White patients. Research suggests that healthcare providers are faced with bias, both unconscious and consciously, this is the foundation on how healthcare providers diagnose, communicate, and recommend treatment in medicine. The Center for Disease Control and Prevention (CDC) declared racism as a serious public health threat in 2021 due to it being a key factor to health disparities in the U.S., more specifically in communities that have limited access to care and chronic illness. Public health officials argue that actual change will need more than just public statements, they touch on the need for structural reforms and action.

Both state and institutions have aimed to adopt new policies that address systemic racism in healthcare. In California, they passed the Senate Bill 464, otherwise known as the California Dignity in Pregnancy and Childbirth Act, that reduces maternal health disparities through mandatory implicit bias training for perinatal care providers. Federally, lawmakers introduced the Black Maternal Health Momnibus Act in 2021, this bill aims to expand medicaid postpartum coverage, an improvement in data collection and maternity care for those incarcerated, however this bill has not yet passed into a law. Medical schools are beginning to align with public health officials, implementing antiracist education as well as offering training on equity and bias in their schools. Slowly reshaping their educational curricula to prepare future healthcare professionals to work in their field of diverse populations. Organizations like the American Public Health Association emphasize the importance of addressing racism in healthcare, and the demand for real action towards change. Organizations are asking for community led research, using tools that understand how racism influence the community of colors health, and anti racism training for workers in healthcare.

In addition, community-based health promotion plays a crucial role in addressing racial disparities in healthcare. Localized, data-driven community health planning allows interventions to be tailored to the specific needs of different populations. Sustainable funding for community infrastructure and preventive care is essential in reducing long-term health inequities, particularly in underserved areas. Furthermore, addressing home-based healthcare challenges is critical, as many marginalized groups face systemic barriers to accessing traditional healthcare settings.

One example of community-based health promotion is the concept of "critical love,". Critical love centers dignity and relational care. This is especially documented in Black-owned community birth centers. These patients report feelings of affirmation, being culturally understood and safe. Critical love demonstrates the importance of culturally connected care models. Within this structure, researchers Karbeah and Hardeman argue that medical racism can be counteracted with dignity and relational accountability. Community based approaches affirm that improved outcomes are not simply linked to better access, but of environments built in consideration of their populations. These satisfaction rates are not often reported at mainstream facilities.

Another structural change involves value-based reimbursement and social determinants of health (SDOH). Shifting from a fee-for-service model to value-based reimbursement can incentivize equity-focused care by rewarding providers for improved health outcomes rather than the volume of services provided. This transition creates economic opportunities for upstream interventions that address SDOH, such as housing, education, and food security, which significantly impact health disparities.

One major issue comes from a lack of national data on maternal outcomes. While hospitals report clinical statistics to the state and federal government, this data is not consistently collected to reflect race on a national level. In the fragmented standards, true accountability is not achieved as hospitals cannot be penalized or evaluated on present racial disparities.This limited data collection hides the impact of racial disparities, and there is no way to monitor an institute's performance.

Finally, workforce diversity and education are critical in reducing disparities in healthcare. Increased funding for STEM education in under-resourced communities can help create a more diverse pipeline of future healthcare professionals. Additionally, federal support for diversity initiatives in medical schools and hospital systems can improve representation within the medical workforce, ultimately leading to better cultural competence and more equitable healthcare delivery.

== See also ==
- African American student access to medical schools
- Psychological impact of discrimination on health § Institutional racism in the United States
- Race and health in the United States
