= Silas Laurence Loomis =

American physician

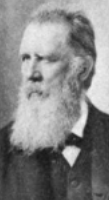
- Born: May 22, 1822; Coventry, Connecticut
- Died: June 22, 1896 (aged 74); Fernandina Beach, Florida
- Education: Wesleyan University; Georgetown University
- Occupations: Scientist, educator, inventor

Silas Laurence Loomis (1822–1896) was an American scientist, educator, and inventor.

== Biography ==
Loomis was born in Coventry, Connecticut, on May 22, 1822. He graduated from Wesleyan University in 1844 and earned a degree in medicine from Georgetown University in 1856. Previous to his study at Wesleyan, Loomis had taught at Holliston Academy in Massachusetts; after graduating from college, he was principal of Western Academy in Washington, D.C., and subsequently became professor of physiology at Georgetown. He was astronomer to the United States Coast Survey in 1857, and instructor in mathematics to naval cadets in 1860. From 1861 to 1867, he was professor of chemistry and toxicology at Georgetown, subsequently serving as dean at Howard University until 1869.

From 1862 to 1863, during the American Civil War, Loomis was a surgeon on Major General George B. McClellan's staff. Later, Loomis invented a process for producing a textile fabric from palmetto, a method for utilizing ores of chromium, and various improvements in instruments of precision, among other inventions.

Loomis died in Fernandina Beach, Florida on June 22, 1896.

== Selected works ==
- Normal Arithmetic (1859)
- Analytical Arithmetic (1860)
- Key to the Normal Course (1867)
- The Education and Health of Woman (1882)
