= Marion Mann =

American physician (1920–2022)

- Born: March 29, 1920; Atlanta, Georgia, U.S.
- Died: August 20, 2022 (aged 102); Washington, D.C., U.S.

Academic background
- Education: Tuskegee Institute; Howard University Medical School (MD); Georgetown University (PhD)
- Military career
- Allegiance: United States
- Branch: Army

Marion Mann (March 29, 1920 – August 20, 2022) was an American physician and pathologist. He was a Dean of the College of Medicine at Howard University from 1970 to 1979.

== Early life ==
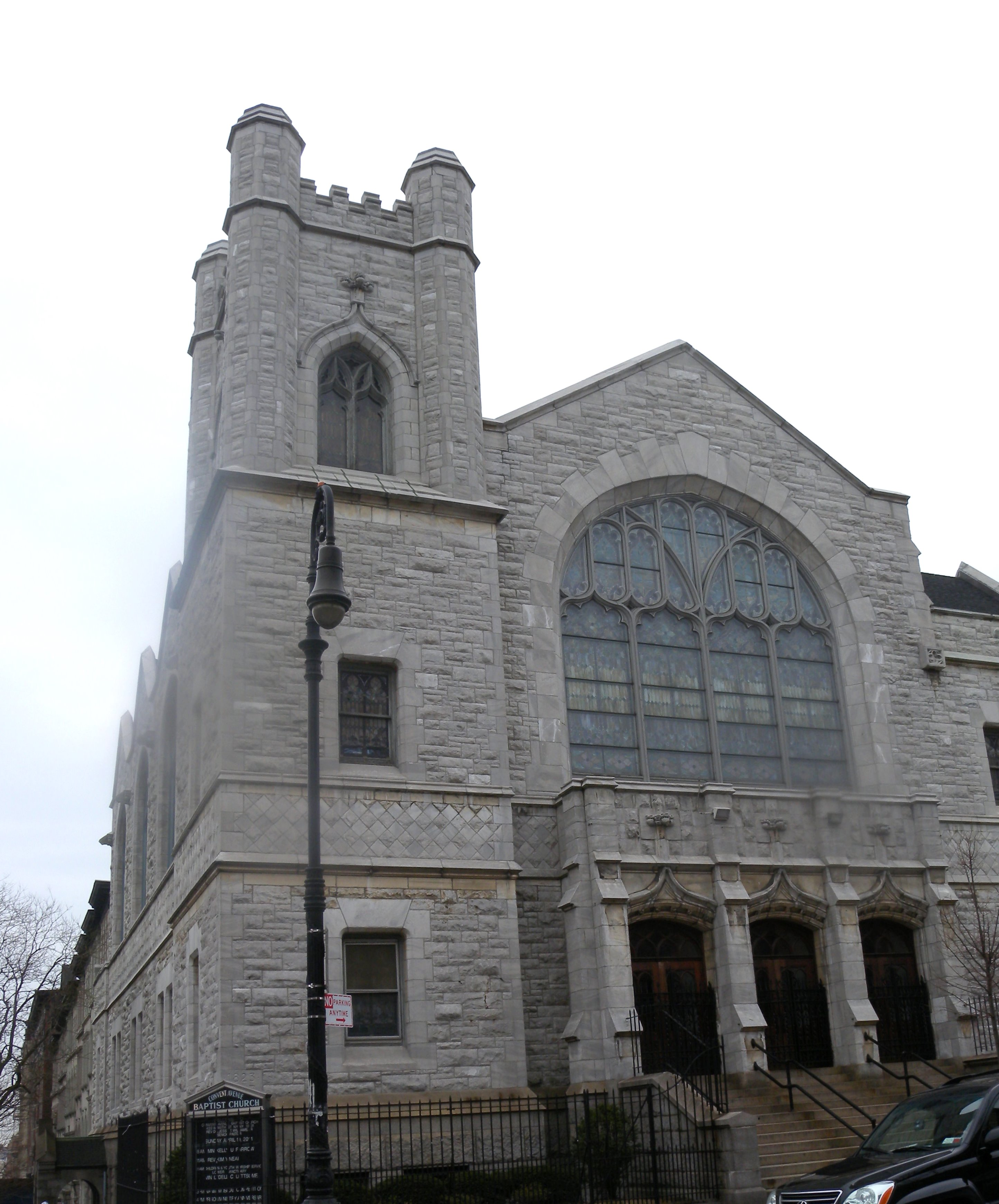
Convent Avenue Baptist Church

Marion was born in Atlanta, Georgia, and was raised, along with five brothers, by his mother, C.C. Mann, who was a church organist (Ebenezer Baptist Church and Liberty Baptist Church in Atlanta; Southern Baptist Church in New York City; and Mt. Bethel Baptist Church in Washington, D.C.). She also was a piano teacher until her death in 1981 at the age of 92. The best known, though not necessarily most talented, of the musical Mann brothers were probably Levi and Howard. Levi played jazz bass (upright) with the Lucky Millinder Orchestra in the 1930s and 1940s and later held down the house musician gig, playing the Hammond B3 organ at the famous 20 Grand Club in Detroit, Michigan during the early Motown years. Howard wrote and composed the gospel classic "Teach Us To Pray" and was organist and choir director at Convent Avenue Baptist Church in Harlem. The other brothers in this accomplished African American family included Lawrence, William, and John Wesley who were all classically trained musicians and educators.

Although a music lover, Mann was the only son of C.C. (Mama) Mann who did not pursue a career as a musician. C.C. had moved the family from Atlanta to Harlem, New York in the 1930s, but Mann went South again to attend college at Tuskegee Institute. At Tuskegee, in 1937, he met fellow student Ruth Maureen Reagin from Selma, Alabama, and Mann and Ruth were married after his graduation (1940) and before he entered the U.S. Army. Mann and Ruth had two children. M. Nicholas Mann was born on the Tuskegee Army Airfield in 1944 while Mann was stationed there as an administrative officer and Nick went on to a career in organization development consulting with a brief foray as writer and music producer (The Reddings). Judith Reagin Walk was born in Yokohama, Japan in 1949 during Mann's post World War II overseas tour of duty. As a university administrator (Eastman School of Music and Howard University), Judy is also a musician (pianist, teacher, and choir director).

== Medical career ==
Mann left the regular Army and entered Howard University Medical School in 1950 and was graduated (M.D.) in 1954. After graduation, his career as a pathologist included serving as a Deputy Coroner in Washington, D.C. Along the way, he earned the Ph.D. degree (1961) from Georgetown University. He accepted a full-time assistant professorship of pathology at his alma mater (Howard) in 1961 and by 1970 was promoted to the rank of professor and named Medical School Dean.

Even though Mann had left the regular Army, he remained in the military as an Army Medical Corps reservist and by 1975 was promoted to the rank of Brigadier General. From 1988 until 1991, after a period of retirement, Mann served as Associate Vice President at Howard University. In that role, he established the university's Office of Research and Administration. But, the accomplishments that he is probably best remembered for came as Dean of the College of Medicine.

=== Deanship at Howard ===
During Mann's Deanship, a more rigorous entrance process was instituted and the entering Freshman class size at the Medical School was increased to 128. Dr. Mann established elaborate student support services that increased student success and reduced attrition. It was during his administration as Dean that the faculty voted to approve requirements that Part-I of the National Board examination be passed for promotion to junior, and that graduating students had passed Part-II. Under Mann's leadership, the Medical School initiated new programs leading to the Ph.D. in anatomy, genetics, and microbiology. Perhaps the most lasting accomplishment of Mann's deanship was the Medical School expansion (spearheaded by Dr. Mann) with the addition of the Seeley G. Mudd building as a pre-clinical science facility next to the existing Numa P. Adams building.

== Personal life and death ==
Mann died in Washington, D.C., on August 20, 2022, at the age of 102.

== Honors ==
Mann's honors include being awarded an honorary Doctor of Science degrees from Georgetown University and the University of Massachusetts; serving as a diplomate of the National Board of Medical Examiners and the American Board of Pathology; and being bestowed the title of Knight Grand Commander of the Human Order of African Redemption from the Republic of Liberia.
