= Alexander Thomas Augusta =

African-American soldier and physician (1825–1890)

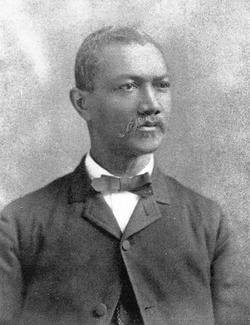
- Alexander Thomas Augusta
- Born: March 8, 1825; Norfolk, Virginia, US
- Died: December 21, 1890 (aged 65); Washington, D.C., US
- Burial place: Arlington National Cemetery
- Military career
- Allegiance: United States
- Branch: United States Army
- Service years: 1863-1865
- Rank: Major
- Units: Freedman's Hospital; United States Army Reserve
- Known for: American Civil War surgeon; Military Officer
- Conflicts: American Civil War

Alexander Thomas Augusta (March 8, 1825 – December 21, 1890) was a surgeon, veteran of the American Civil War, and the first African-American professor of medicine in the United States. After gaining his medical education in Toronto, Canada West from 1850 to 1856, he set up a practice there. He returned to the United States shortly before the start of the American Civil War.

Augusta offered his services to the United States Army and in 1863, he was commissioned as major and the Army's first African-American physician; he became the first black hospital administrator in U.S. history while serving in the army. He left the army in 1866 at the rank of brevet lieutenant colonel.

In 1868, Augusta was the first African American to be appointed to the faculty of Howard University and the first to any medical college in the United States.

== Biography ==
Augusta was born in 1825 to free people of color in Norfolk, Virginia. As a young man, he began to learn to read while working as a barber, although it was illegal for free blacks to do so in Virginia at that time. The state had restricted the rights of free people of color following Nat Turner's Rebellion of 1831.

Augusta moved to Baltimore while still in his youth. He also began pursuing an education in the field of medicine. He married Baltimore native Mary O. Burgoin on January 12, 1847. Augusta was a Prince Hall Freemason.

=== Medical training ===
Augusta applied to study medicine at the University of Pennsylvania but was refused admission. Although he faced institutionalized racism throughout his career, the university cited inadequate preparation in its rejection of him. Augusta persisted in his education and arranged for private instruction from a doctor on the faculty. As he was determined to become a physician, Augusta traveled to California and earned the funds to pursue his goal of becoming a doctor.

Concerned that he would not be allowed to enroll in medical school in the U.S., in 1850, he enrolled at Trinity College (a federated college of the University of Toronto from 1904 onwards). He also conducted business as a chemist and opened a drugstore on Yonge Street. His Bachelor of Medicine (M.B.) degree was not officially conferred until 1860 for unknown reasons, though he completed his medical training in 1856 and received full honours.

=== Medical career ===
Augusta remained in Toronto, Canada West, establishing a medical practice. He worked as an assistant medical attendant on an occasional basis at the Toronto House of Industry. He supported local antislavery activities, which supported the American movement. He was also the president of Provincial Association for the Education and Elevation of the Coloured People of Canada, a literary society that donated books and other school supplies to black children.

=== American Civil War ===
Augusta wrote to President Abraham Lincoln and Edwin Stanton, Secretary of War, on January 7. 1863, offering his services as a surgeon:

Toronto, Canada West, January 7, 1863

To His Excellency Abraham Lincoln President of the U.S.,

Sir,

Having seen that it is intended to garrison the U.S. forts with colored troops, I beg leave to apply to you for an appointment as surgeon to some of the coloured regiments, or as physician to some of the depots of "freedmen". I was compelled to leave my native country, and come to this on account of prejudice against colour, for the purpose of obtaining a knowledge of my profession, and having accomplished that object, at one of the principle educational institutions of this Province, I am now prepared to practice it, and would like to be in a position where I can be of use to my race.

If you will take the matter into favorable consideration, I am given satisfactory references as to character and qualification from some of the most distinguished members of the profession in this city where I have been in practice for about six years.

I remain sir, yours very respectfully

A.T. Augusta, Bachelor of Medicine, Trinity College, Toronto

He was initially rejected due to his racial background and, since he was a British subject, his enlistment would violate Great Britain's Proclamation of Neutrality. In response, he traveled to Washington, D.C., to plead his case.

The Army Medical Board reconsidered and invited him to take the examination. He passed the test on 14 April 1863 and received a major's commission as surgeon for African-American troops. He was the United States Army's first African-American physician (of a total of eight) and its highest-ranking African-American officer at the time. He was also appointed to lead the Freedman's Hospital in Washington, D.C., in 1863, becoming the first black hospital administrator in U.S. history.

Some white people resented Augusta's having such a high rank. He was mobbed in Baltimore while wearing his officer's uniform during May 1863 (where three people were arrested for assault), and in another incident in Washington. On October 2, 1863, he was commissioned Regimental Surgeon of the Seventh U.S. Colored Troops. In March 1865, he was awarded a brevet promotion to lieutenant colonel and left the military service the following year at that rank.

=== Activism against discrimination ===
While in the military, Augusta spoke out about the discrimination suffered by African Americans in society. On February 1, 1864, Augusta wrote to Judge Advocate Captain C. W. Clippington about discrimination against African-American passengers on the streetcars of Washington, D.C.. Dr. Augusta's letter was printed in New York and Washington newspapers and read aloud in Congress on February 10, 1864, by Massachusetts Senator Charles Sumner:

Sir: I have the honor to report that I have been obstructed in getting to the court this morning by the conductor of car No. 32, of the Fourteenth Street line of the city railway.

I started from my lodgings to go to the hospital I formerly had charge of to get some notes of the case I was to give evidence in, and hailed the car at the corner of Fourteenth and I streets. It was stopped for me and when I attempted to enter the conductor pulled me back, and informed me that I must ride on the front with the driver as it was against the rules for colored persons to ride inside. I told him, I would not ride on the front, and he said I should not ride at all. He then ejected me from the platform, and at the same time gave orders to the driver to go on. I have therefore been compelled to walk the distance in the mud and rain, and have also been delayed in my attendance upon the court. I therefore most respectfully request that the offender may be arrested and brought to punishment.

A.T. Augusta, M.B., Surgeon Seventh U.S. Colored Troops.

Sumner introduced a resolution in Congress, supported by his reading of the letter to the assemblage:

Resolved, That the Committee on the District of Columbia be directed to consider the expediency of further providing by law against the exclusion of colored persons from the equal enjoyment of all railroad privileges in the District of Columbia.

Edward Bates, the Attorney General in President Abraham Lincoln's cabinet, belittled the incident and the senators who supported Sumner. He was a slaveholder, but earlier in his career in St. Louis, Missouri, had acted as defense counsel for enslaved persons in freedom suits.

In 1865 Augusta wrote a letter to Major General Lewis Wallace, protesting the unequal treatment of African-American train passengers, who were forced to sit in segregated sections. That letter preceded the Plessy v. Ferguson case, which challenged racial segregation on public transportation in the U.S.

On February 26, 1868, Augusta testified before the United States Congressional Committee on the District of Columbia with regard to Mrs. Kate Brown. Mrs. Brown, an employee of Congress and an African American, had been injured when an employee of the Alexandria, Washington, and Georgetown Railroad forcibly ejected her from a passenger car. The railroad was prohibited by its federal charter from discriminating against passengers because of race.

=== Later years ===
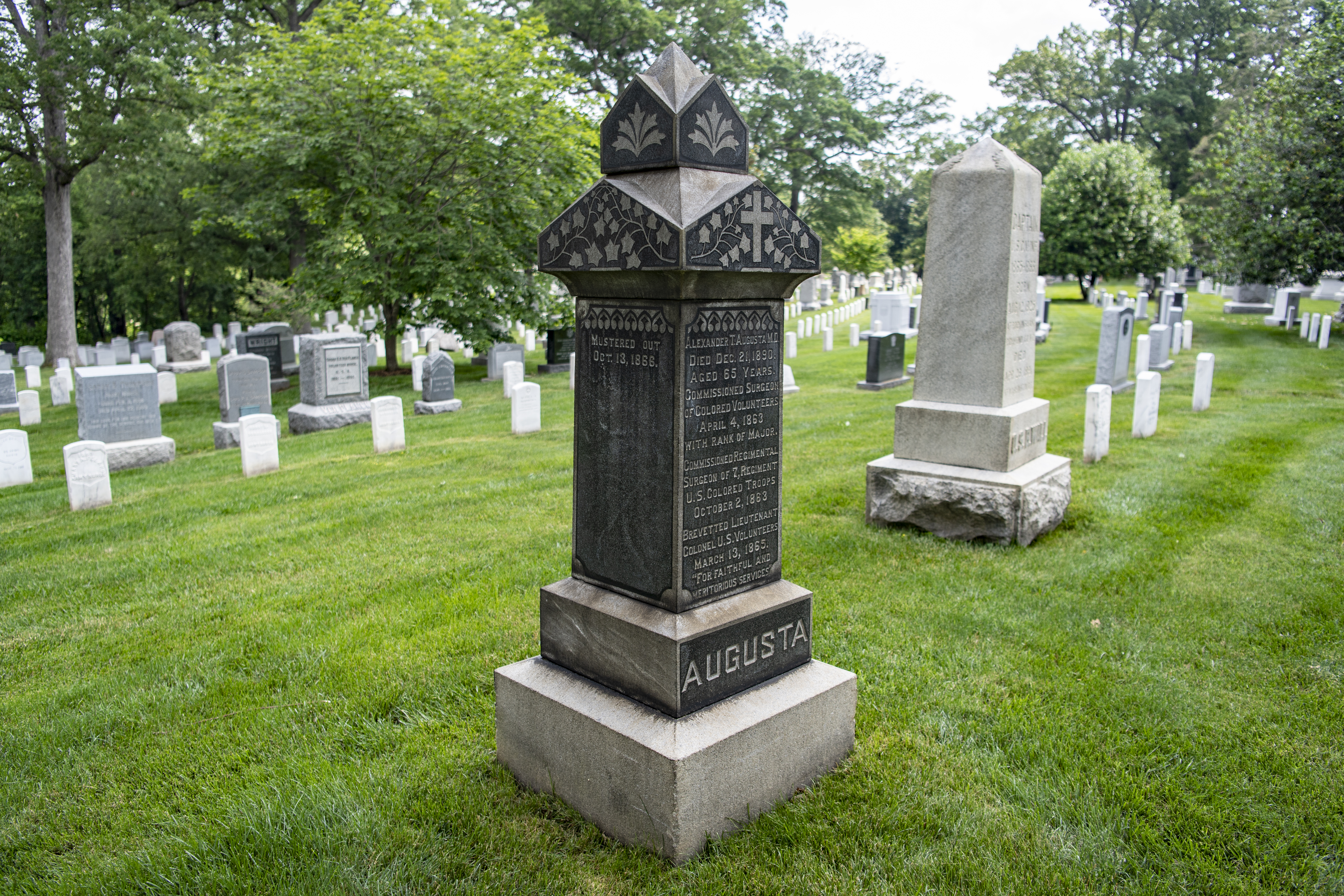
Grave at Arlington National Cemetery

Mustering out of the service in October 1866, Augusta accepted an assignment with the Freedmen's Bureau, heading the agency's Lincoln Hospital in Savannah, Georgia. While there, he encouraged African-American self-help, urged the freedmen to support independent institutions, and gained respect from the city's white physicians.

Augusta returned to private practice in Washington, D.C. He was attending surgeon to the Smallpox Hospital in Washington in 1870. He also served on the staff of the local Freedmen's Hospital, which he had directed for a period during the war.

Augusta taught anatomy in the recently organized medical department at Howard University from November 8, 1868, to July 1877, becoming the first African American appointed to the faculty of the school and also of any medical college in the U.S. He received honorary degrees of M.D. in 1869 and A.M. in 1871 from Howard in recognition of his contributions.

Despite his accomplishments, Dr Augusta was repeatedly refused admission to the local society of physicians. On June 9, 1869, Augusta and Charles Burleigh Purvis were proposed for membership in the Medical Society of DC, a branch of the American Medical Association. They were considered eligible, but did not receive enough votes. Another black physician, A. W. Tucker, was proposed on June 23, but was also rejected. In response, these three formed the National Medical Society. Augusta feared such exclusion from a professional society would impede the progress of younger African-American physicians in the city, and worked against such racial discrimination.

He died in Washington on December 21, 1890. He was interred at Arlington National Cemetery, in Arlington, Virginia.

Augusta's headstone reads as follows:

Commissioned surgeon of colored volunteers, April 4, 1863, with the rank of Major.
Commissioned regimental surgeon of the 7th Regiment of U.S. Colored Troops, October 2, 1863.
Brevet Lieutenant Colonel of Volunteers, March 13, 1865.
For faithful and meritorious services.
Mustered out Oct. 13, 1866.

=== Legacy ===
On May 19, 2023, Alexander T. Augusta Military Medical Center, a United States Department of Defense medical facility located on Fort Belvoir, Virginia, outside of Washington D.C, was named in his honor. Following the awareness work of Dr. Nav Persaud, Trinity College, University of Toronto, offers the Dr. Alexander Thomas Augusta Award for a Trinity student identifying as Black, Indigenous or a Person of Colour, on the basis of financial need and demonstrated or planned community contributions on or off campus.

== See also ==
- Timeline of African-American firsts
