= Robert Reyburn =

New Zealand orchardist, farmer and politician

Robert Reyburn (4 January 1810 – 21 October 1892) was a New Zealand orchardist, farmer and politician. He was born in Kilmarnock, Ayrshire, Scotland in 1810.
