= Howard University Hospital =

Private university hospital in Washington, D.C.

- Howard University Healthcare

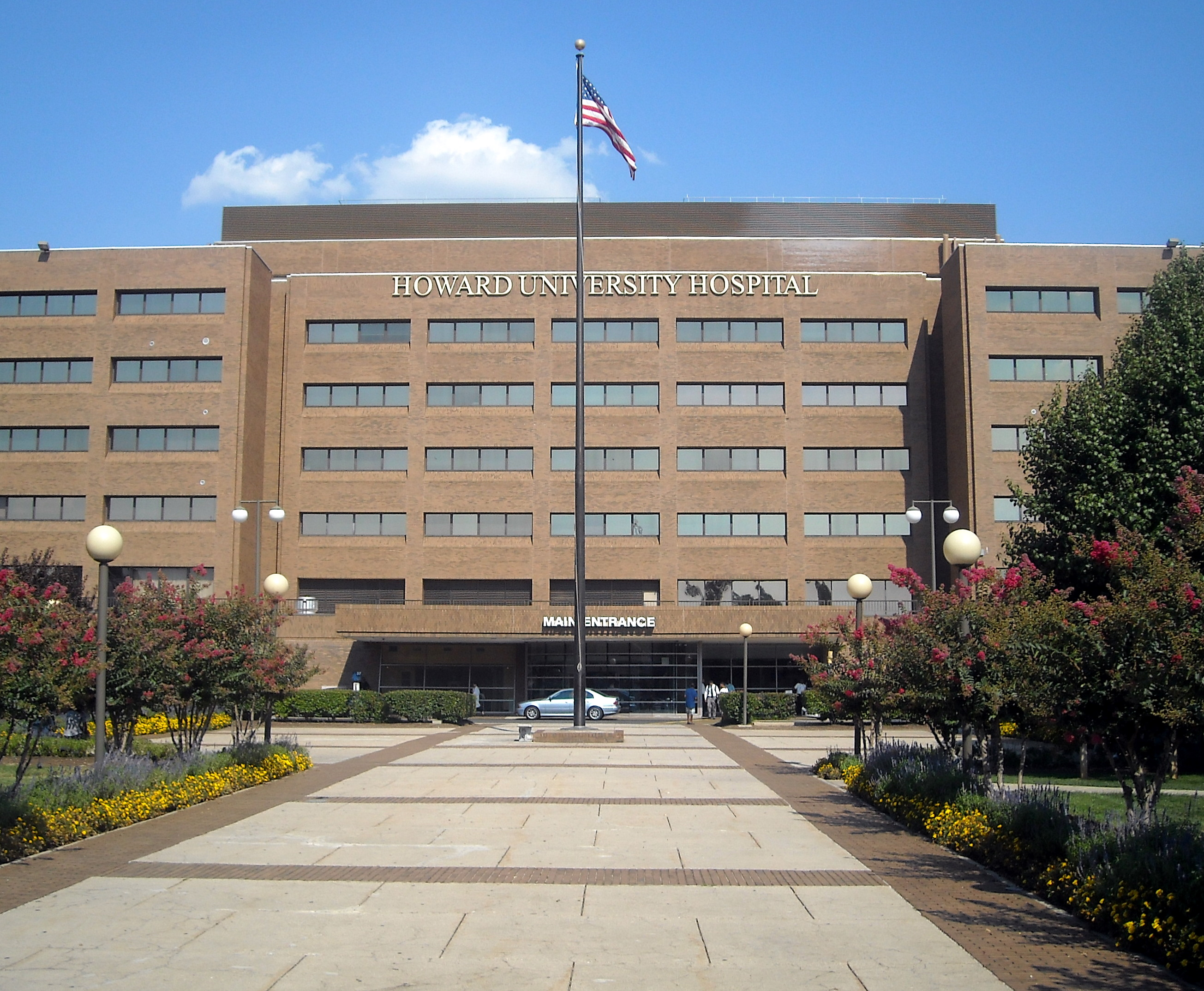
- Howard University Hospital in August 2008

Geography
- Location: 2041 Georgia Ave., NW 20060, Washington Metropolitan Area, Washington, D.C., U.S.
- Coordinates: 38.9175°N 77.02°W

Organisation
- Type: Private, nonprofit
- Affiliated university: Howard University College of Medicine

Services
- Emergency department: Level I trauma center
- Beds: 300

History
- Founded: 1862; 164 years ago

Links
- Website: huhealthcare.com
- Lists: Hospitals in U.S.

Howard University Hospital, previously known as Freedmen's Hospital, is a major hospital located in Washington, D.C., built on the site of Griffith Stadium, a former professional baseball stadium that served as the home field of the Washington Senators. The hospital has served the African American community in the Washington metropolitan area since its 1862 founding.

Howard University Hospital (HUH) is a private, nonprofit institution in Washington, D.C. affiliated with Howard University. It is the nation's only teaching hospital on the campus of a historically black university. It offers medical students opportunities to observe and participate in clinical and research work with professionals.

Following the Civil War, the hospital catered to the medical needs of thousands of African Americans who fled the Southern United States for the Northeast as part of the Great Migration. The first hospital of its kind to provide medical treatment for former slaves, it later became the major hospital for the area's African American community.

== Services ==
The 2001 closure of D.C. General Hospital sent the poorest patients there, and by 2016 the financially overburdened hospital had the highest rate of wrongful death lawsuits of any health facility in Washington, D.C. In 2020 the hospital came under the management of Adventist HealthCare, providing new resources and opportunities for clinical training in the network's other facilities.

Physicians and other health professionals are engaged weekly in activities and services in the local community, including medical presentations, free health screenings, educational workshops, and health fairs. HUH's community-based programs include the Diabetes Treatment Center, a facility that service the medical needs of diabetic patients through a multidisciplinary approach to patient care. The Minority Organ Tissue Transplant Education Program (MOTTEP), founded by transplant surgeon Clive O. Callender, is headquartered at Howard University Hospital. Specialized services include endocrinology, ophthalmology, podiatry, diabetes education, pharmacy services and nutrition services. Counseling is tailored to the patient's goals, education and lifestyle.

HUH functions as a Level 1 Trauma Center for the Washington metropolitan area. It handles more than 1,300 admissions annually and became one of the primary trauma centers for District residents after the closure of District of Columbia General Hospital.

HUH trauma leadership includes Dr. Edward E. Cornwell, III, a trauma surgeon, author and community activist who has devoted his career to work in urban communities. His work in the operating room and his outreach to Black males has been featured in Black Enterprise magazine and by ABC News. The Division of Trauma is also noted for the high research productivity of its surgeons, with more than 50 trauma articles published in peer-reviewed journals in the past three years.

HUH, along with the Division of Health Sciences and the Howard University Office of University Communications, publishes a quarterly health newsletter called The Check Up.

== History ==
=== Freedmen's Hospital ===
Freedmen's Hospital and Asylum was first established in 1862 on the grounds of the Camp Barker, 13th and R Streets, NW, and cared for freed, disabled and aged blacks. In 1863, it was placed under the charge of Dr. Alexander Augusta, the first African American to head a hospital in the United States. After the Civil War, it became the teaching hospital of Howard University Medical School, established in 1868, while remaining under federal control. Prior to 1874 it was run by the Freedmen's Bureau in the U.S. Department of War, and in 1874 it was transferred to the Department of the Interior.

In 1881, Charles Burleigh Purvis was appointed by President Chester Arthur to Surgeon-in-Charge at the Freedmen's hospital. Purvis was Surgeon-in-Charge at the Freedmen's Hospital from October 1, 1881, to 1894, and in that role was the first black person to head a hospital under civilian authority. During 1883–1905, the hospital was run by the Commissioners of the District of Columbia, but it was returned to the Department of the Interior afterwards.

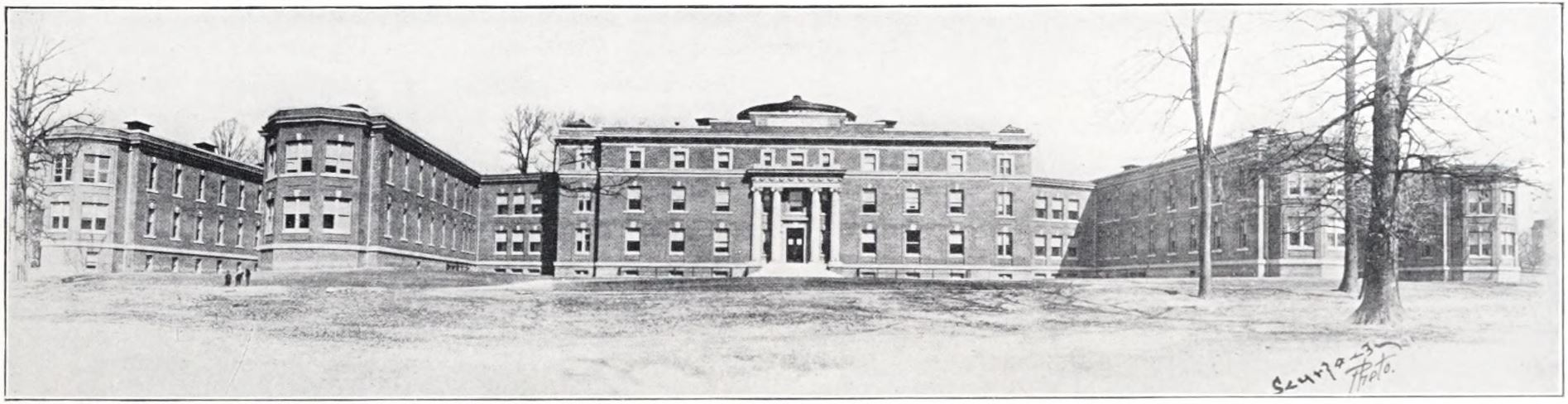
The 1909 hospital building, c. 1910

Early in the 20th century, Congress authorized the construction of a new hospital. It was completed in 1909 on Bryant Street, NW, between 4th and 6th Streets. When Abraham Flexner visited the District of Columbia that year, he was impressed by the new, 278-bed Freedmen's Hospital and thought only Howard University Medical School in the city had a promising future.

In 1940, the hospital was transferred from the Department of the Interior to the U.S. Public Health Service.

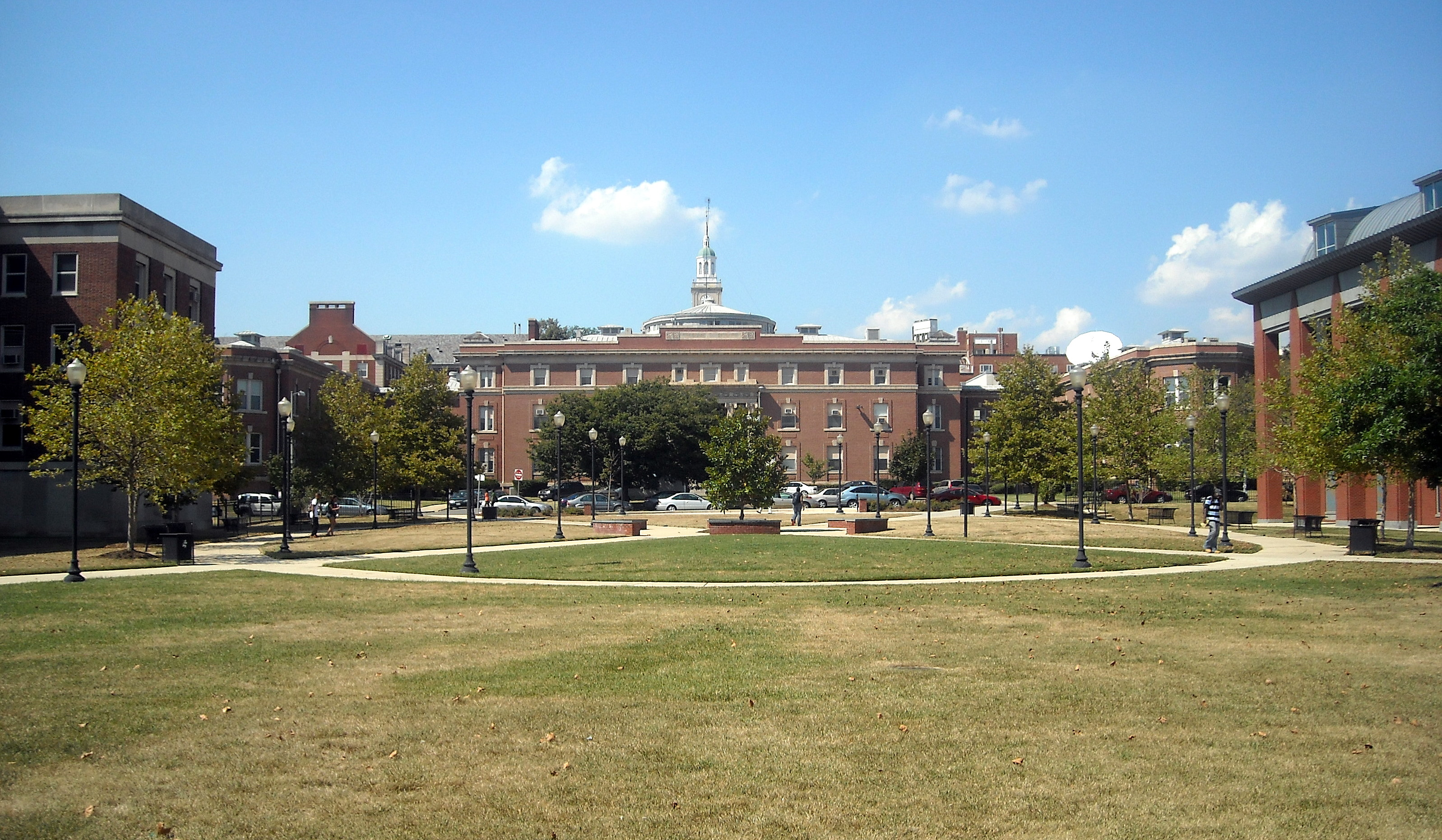
The former hospital building in use as the John H. Johnson School of Communications in 2008

In 1967, Freedmen's Hospital was transferred to Howard University and used as a hospital until 1975. The original Freedmen's building on Bryant Street still stands, although it now houses Howard University's John H. Johnson School of Communications. Freedmen's Hall, a permanent museum located at the University Hospital, is devoted to the history of medical education and health care at Howard University.

=== Modern facility ===
The University Hospital is now located in a modern facility at 2041 Georgia Avenue, NW, the former site of Griffith Stadium, the home venue of the Homestead Grays, Washington Senators, and Washington Redskins (NFL). The stadium was demolished in 1965.

In February 2020, Howard University Hospital and Adventist HealthCare signed an agreement, to have Adventist HealthCare manage the hospital for three years. Anita L. A. Jenkins, former president of Sycamore Medical Center, part of Kettering Health Network, became the hospital's chief executive.

In June 2025, the acquisition talks with Adventist HealthCare came to an end, and the partnership would end in February 2026.

== See also ==
- List of former United States Army medical units
- African American student access to medical schools
