= Chi Delta Mu =

American professional fraternity for allied health

- ΧΔΜ
- Founded: January 30, 1913; 113 years ago Howard University; Washington, D.C.
- Type: Professional
- Affiliation: Independent
- Status: Active
- Emphasis: Allied health professions
- Scope: National
- Member badge
- Colors: Red and Blue
- Symbol: Griffin
- Chapters: 9
- Headquarters: 2120 W Bert Kouns Industrial Loop, Suite C Shreveport, Louisiana 71118; United States
- Website: www.cdmfrat.org

Chi Delta Mu (ΧΔΜ) is a professional fraternity for students and graduates in the allied health professions. Founded at Howard University in 1913, Chi Delta Mu was traditionally an African American fraternity.

== History ==
Chi Delta Mu was founded in the Howard University College of Medicine in 1913. The first meeting laying the ground work for the fraternity took place on January 30, 1913, and it was presided over by E. Clayton Terry and Charles Humbert. The January meeting was attended by twenty-eight students, and several decided to return at a later date to formally establish the details of the new organization.

The meeting for organization took place on February 6, 1913, under the guidance of faculty member Dr. William C. McNeill. The name Chi Delta Mu was selected at a special meeting on February 11, 1913. The purpose of the fraternity was to "unite men of the medical professions of Medicine, Dentistry, and Pharmacy into a closer relationship so that the highest degree of efficiency and scientific ability might be developed." By 1923, the fraternity had twelve chapters.

Although traditionally made up of African American students, the fraternity integrated its membership in 1949 when a white student, Howard medical school senior Paul Guth, was admitted to membership in the Alpha chapter. Hubert Humphrey was initiated as an honorary member of Chi Delta Mu in 1954. He was a key-note speaker at the fraternity's conclave in April of that year, where he was recognized for his efforts in the civil rights movement.

Fifteen graduate chapters and four undergraduate chapters existed as of 1968.

The fraternity's national headquarters are in Shreveport, Louisiana.

== Symbols ==
The fraternity's pin closely resembles its crest. The pin is rendered in gold, with a rectangle affixed with the Greek letters of the society, ΧΔΜ surrounded by alternating stones in red and blue. The rectangle is surmounted by a Griffin, facing dexter. The fraternity's colors are red and blue.

== Chapters ==
Following is a list of chapters of Chi Delta Mu. Active chapters are indicated in bold. Inactive chapters are in italics.

Chapter	Charter date	Institution	Location	Status	Ref.
**Alpha**	January 30, 1913	Howard University	Washington, D.C.	Active	
Beta	<= 1922		Kansas City, Missouri		
**Gamma**	<= 1922		St. Louis, Missouri	Active	
Delta	<= 1922		Newark, New Jersey		
Epsilon	<= 1922		Boston, Massachusetts		
Zeta	<= 1922		New York, New York		
Eta	between 1922 and 1927		Kimball, West Virginia		
Theta	between 1922 and 1927		Lawrence, Kansas		
**Iota**	between 1922 and 1927		Baltimore, Maryland	Active	
Kappa	between 1922 and 1927		Boley, Oklahoma		
**Lambda**	between 1922 and 1927		Washington, D.C.	Active	
Mu	between 1922 and 1927	Meharry Medical College	Nashville, Tennessee		
**Nu**	between 1922 and 1927		Philadelphia, Pennsylvania	Active	
**Xi**			Brooklyn and Long Island, New York	Active	
**Pi**	March 7, 1948		Pittsburgh, Pennsylvania	Active	
**Rho**			Richmond, Virginia	Active	
Tau	September 1950	Xavier University of Louisiana	New Orleans, Louisiana	Inactive	
Alpha Alpha	<= 1963		Indianapolis, Indiana		

== Notable members ==
- Debbie Allen, actress, dancer, and choreographer
- Eugene Dibble, American Physician; Head of the Hospital at the Tuskegee Institute. Important Role in the Tuskegee Syphilis Study.
- Hubert Humphrey (Honorary), Vice President of the United States
- Thomas E. Jones, medical doctor and captain in the United States Army during World War I
- Ernest Everett Just, pioneering biologist, academic and science writer
- Theresa Greene Reed, physician and epidemiologist
- Frank S. Royal, physician and former president of the National Medical Association
- James Whittico Jr., physician and former president of the National Medical Association
