= Veronica Mallett =

American urogynecologist

- Born: May 5, 1957 (age 69)
- Education: Barnard College; Michigan State University; Carnegie Mellon University
- Occupations: Physician, Medical academic
- Known for: Urogynecology, Health Equity
- Spouse: Kevin Isaac Brisco
- Children: 6

Veronica Thierry Mallett (born May 5, 1957) is an American health physician who serves as senior VP and chief administrative officer of the More in Common Alliance (MICA), a collaboration between CommonSpirit Health and Morehouse School of Medicine. She is known for her work in urogynecology, specifically with respect to genital organ prolapse and urinary incontinence, and for her efforts in reducing health disparities.

She has authored or co-authored more than 30 articles, as well as two chapters of the fourth edition of Tintinalli's Emergency Medicine: a comprehensive study guide on obstetrics and gynecology.

== Early life ==
Veronica Mallett was born to Dr. Conrad L. Mallett Sr., Ed.D and Dr. Claudia Gwendolyn Jones Mallett, Ed.D in Detroit, Michigan, the youngest of three children.

=== Post-secondary education ===
Mallett graduated from Barnard College at Columbia University in 1979 with a pre-med degree. While at Barnard, Mallett served as the president of the Barnard Organization of Black Women.

She returned to her home state of Michigan, enrolling in Michigan State University College of Human Medicine. She graduated from the College of Human Medicine in 1983 and went on to complete a residency at Wayne State University School of Medicine, in conjunction with Detroit Medical Center. She finished the program in 1987, then took a position at Northwestern University in Chicago. While at Northwestern, she began to focus on urogynecology.

She also obtained a Master's degree in Medical Management from Carnegie Mellon University.

== Career ==
=== Early career ===
She returned to Wayne State in 1991, accepting a fellowship that ended in 1993. She stayed on at the University as an assistant professor, and in 1994 became director of Hutzel Women's Hospital's Women's Continence and Pelvic Surgery Center. In 1999, Mallett was promoted to residency program director, and in 2000, she became an associate professor at Wayne State.

A 2001 listing of medical professionals in Black Enterprise stated Mallett offered a procedure known as the Tension-Free Vaginal Sling that aided female patients suffering from incontinence. It was an outpatient procedure offered at Oakwood Hospital and Medical Center in Dearborn, MI. She continued to be employed with Oakwood at the beginning of 2005.

Mallett moved to Tennessee in 2005, taking the position as first female chair of a clinical department at the University of Tennessee where she served as the medical director of healthcare excellence.

Mallett established the position of chair of obstetrics and gynecology at the Paul L. Foster School of Medicine in 2011, making her the Founding Chair. She helped launch the OB/GYN school at the university and helped establish a medical school and health science center to address the physician shortage in El Paso, Texas.

=== Meharry Medical College ===
Mallet returned to Tennessee on March 1, 2017 to serve as the Dean at Meharry Medical College, replacing Dr. Marquetta L. Faulkner. Mallett intended to turn Meharry into an example of "innovation and excellence in providing high-quality, cost-efficient, safe, patient-centered care in an urban safety net teaching environment." One area on which she focused was telehealth, recognizing the growing trend and a need to address how to handle virtual treatment in the curriculum.

During her tenure as senior vice president of health affairs and Dean of Meharry, Nashville General Hospital began taking in fewer patients due to longstanding financial issues. Third and fourth year students at Meharry doing their hospital rotations traditionally completed at least some at Nashville General, but with fewer patients, the arrangement was no longer viable. Working with President James Hildreth and HCA Healthcare, a new agreement to allow Meharry students to complete the necessary rotations at TriStar Southern Hills in Nashville was reached.

Mallett also worked with the Detroit Medical Center to establish a cooperative partnership that allowed Meharry students to study and train at the Detroit facilities. Sinai-Grace Hospital had already accepted Meharry students in July 2018, alongside residency students from both Michigan State and Wayne State universities.

She also worked with Middle Tennessee State University and the state of Tennessee to finalize a deal that would allow six college freshmen to fast-track their medical degree education with state-subsidized tuition in exchange for staying in Tennessee to practice medicine for at least two years. Negotiations began in 2017 shortly after she accepted the position of Dean, and were finalized in 2019.

Mallett also served as the executive director of the Center for Women's Health Research. During the COVID-19 pandemic, Mallett joined with Nashville's emergency management team and helped conduct in-person testing at Meharry and at Nissan Stadium.

In 2021, Meharry launched Meharry Medical College Ventures, naming Mallett as the president and CEO. She was succeeded in the position of CEO by Reginald Holt, who took over in April 2023.

=== The More in Common Alliance ===
Mallett joined the staff of the More in Common Alliance, a ten-year initiative begun in December 2020, as its chief administrative officer in May 2022. The Alliance is a joint venture between CommonSpirit Health, a Catholic-oriented U.S. hospital chain, and Morehouse School of Medicine.

Part of Mallett's role includes raising funds to match CommonSpirit's financial commitment. The goal of the program is, essentially, to help patients and doctors build trust by ensuring patients are not only able to verbally communicate with their physicians but also to relate to them culturally or ethnically.

=== Memberships and recognition ===
Mallett is a member of The Links, Inc., and an alumna of Drexel University's Executive Leadership in Academic Medicine program (2007). She joined the American Association of Gynecologic Laparoscopists in December 2011.

In 2020 she was recognized by the Nashville Business Journal as a "woman of influence". She received the Nashville 2022 ATHENA Traditional award, an acknowledgement of leadership skills recognized in eleven nations. She serves on the board of directors of Sharecare.

=== Board certifications ===
Mallett is certified by the American Board of Obstetrics and Gynecology in both obstetric and gynecologic medicine and in female pelvic medicine and reconstructive surgery.

== Personal life ==
Mallett is married to husband Kevin Brisco. They have six children.

Her brother is retired Michigan Supreme Court Chief Justice Conrad L. Mallett, Jr., who also served as president of Sinai-Grace Hospital.

== Publications ==
Throughout her career, Mallett has authored or co-authored numerous works in the field of urogynecology and gynecology, as well as on medical equity.

=== Articles ===
Sanderson, Maureen; Cook, Mekeila; et al. (2023-06-09). "Lifetime Interpersonal Violence or Abuse and Diabetes Rates by Sex and Race". American Journal of Preventive Medicine. 65 (5): 783–791. doi:10.1016/j.amepre.2023.06.007. PMC 10592556. PMID 37302511.

Blasingame, Miaya; Mallett, Veronica; et al. (2023-01-11). "Association of Psychosocial Factors on COVID-19 Testing among YWCA Service Recipients". International Journal of Environmental Research and Public Health. 20 (2): 1297. doi:10.3390/ijerph20021297. PMC 9859612. PMID 36674054.

Mallett, Veronica (2022-09-01). "Opinion: We must redesign medical education to support clinician diversity". Modern Healthcare.

Maldonado, Pedro Antonio; Jackson, Elisha; et al. (January 2021). "Qualitative Analysis of Knowledge, Attitudes, and Beliefs About Pessary Use Among Spanish-Speaking Women on the US-Mexico Border". Female Pelvic Medicine & Reconstructive Surgery. 27 (1): 96–100. doi:10.1097/SPV.0000000000000825. PMID 32149869.

Montoya, T. Ignacio; Rondeau, Nancy U.; et al. (January 1, 2021). "Decision Aid Video for Treatment Selection in Latinas With Symptomatic Pelvic Organ Prolapse: A Randomized Pilot Study". Female Pelvic Medicine & Reconstructive Surgery. 27 (1): 39–45. doi:10.1097/SPV.0000000000000727. PMID 31008776.

Montoya, Teodoro I.; Morera, Osvaldo; et al. (March 2020). "Validation of the body image in pelvic organ prolapse questionnaire in Spanish-speaking Latinas". American Journal of Obstetrics and Gynecology. 222 (3): S789. doi:10.1016/j.ajog.2019.12.064.

Maldonado, Pedro A.; Robb, James; et al. (March 2019). "Satisfaction and comprehension after informed consent in Spanish-speaking patients undergoing gynecologic surgery". American Journal of Obstetrics and Gynecology. 220 (3): S748. doi:10.1016/j.ajog.2019.01.094.

Maldonado, Pedro A.; Wisecup, Ciara; et al. (March 2019). "Informed consent for gynecologic surgery: patient and provider priorities". American Journal of Obstetrics and Gynecology. 220 (3): S748. doi:10.1016/j.ajog.2019.01.095.

Robb, James; Mackay, Alex; et al. (January 2019). "Spanish Language Pelvic Floor Disorders Patient Information Handouts: How Readable Are They?". Female Pelvic Medicine and Reconstructive Surgery. 25 (1): 72–75. doi:10.1097/SPV.0000000000000510. PMID 29095247.

Gher, Jessica; Mendez, Melissa; et al. (April 2018) [March 19, 2018]. "Provider Attitudes, Beliefs, and Barriers About Contraceptive Counseling in Adolescents along the Texas-Mexico Border". Journal of Pediatric and Adolescent Gynecology. 31 (2): 167. doi:10.1016/j.jpag.2018.02.028.

Mallett, Veronica T.; Jezari, Anna M.; et al. (February 2018) [August 2, 2017]. "Barriers to seeking care for urinary incontinence in Mexican American women". International Urogynecology Journal. 29 (2): 235–241. doi:10.1007/s00192-017-3420-6. PMID 28770297.

Montoya, Teodoro I.; Rondeau, Nancy; et al. (February 2018). "Decision aid video for treatment selection in Latina patients with symptomatic pelvic organ prolapse: A pilot study". American Journal of Obstetrics and Gynecology. 218 (2, S2): S887–S888. doi:10.1016/j.ajog.2017.12.196.

Jackson, Elisha; Hernandez, Loretta; et al. (September 2017). "Knowledge, Perceptions, and Attitudes Toward Pelvic Organ Prolapse and Urinary Incontinence in Spanish-Speaking Latinas". Female Pelvic Medicine & Reconstructive Surgery. 23 (5): 324–28. doi:10.1097/SPV.0000000000000393. PMID 28118172.

Jackson, Elisha; Bilbao, Jorge A.; et al. (December 2015) [July 15, 2015]. "Risk factors for ureteral occlusion during transvaginal uterosacral ligament suspension". International Urogynecology Journal. 26 (12): 1809–1814. doi:10.1007/s00192-015-2770-1. PMID 26174656.

Mallett, Veronica (2012-09-17). "Dr. Veronica Mallett: You needn't 'live with' incontinence, other pelvic problems". El Paso Times. ProQuest 1039876349.

FitzGerald, Mary P.; Dubeau, Catherine E.; et al. (September 2011). "Patient expectations did not predict outcome of drug and behavioral treatment of urgency urinary incontinence". Female Pelvic Medicine and Reconstructive Surgery. 17 (5). Urinary Incontinence Treatment Network: 231–237. doi:10.1097/SPV.0b013e31822dd10b. PMC 3329782. PMID 22453106.

Burgio, Kathryn L.; Kraus, Stephen R.; et al. (August 5, 2008). "Behavioral therapy to enable women with urge incontinence to discontinue drug treatment: a randomized trial". Annals of Internal Medicine. 149 (3). Urinary Incontinence Treatment Network: 161–169. doi:10.7326/0003-4819-149-3-200808050-00005. PMC 3201984. PMID 18678843.

Kraus, Stephen; Markland, Alayne; et al. (May 2008). "Race/Ethnic Differences in Symptoms and Impacts of Urinary Incontinence in Women Undergoing Stress Incontinence Surgery". UroToday International Journal. 1 (15).

Mallett, Veronica T.; Brubaker, Linda; et al. (March 2008). "The expectations of patients who undergo surgery for stress incontinence". American Journal of Obstetrics and Gynecology. 198 (3). Urinary Incontinence Treatment Network: 308.E1 - 308/.E6. doi:10.1016/j.ajog.2007.09.003. PMID 18313452.

FitzGerald, Mary P.; Burgio, Kathryn L.; et al. (October 2007) [August 7, 2007]. "Pelvic-floor strength in women with incontinence as assessed by the brink scale". Physical Therapy. 7 (10). Urinary Incontinence Treatment Network: 1316–1324. doi:10.2522/ptj.20060073. PMID 17684087.

Kraus, Stephen R.; Markland, Alayne; et al. (July 2007). "Race and ethnicity do not contribute to differences in preoperative urinary incontinence severity or symptom bother in women who undergo stress incontinence surgery". American Journal of Obstetrics and Gynecology. 97 (1). Urinary Incontinence Treatment Network: 92.E1 - 92.E6. doi:10.1016/j.ajog.2007.03.072. PMC 2034292. PMID 17618773.

Albo, Michael E.; Richter, Holly E.; et al. (May 24, 2007). "Burch Colposuspension versus Fascial Sling to Reduce Urinary Stress Incontinence". New England Journal of Medicine. 356 (21). Urinary Incontinence Treatment Network: 2143–2155. doi:10.1056/NEJMoa070416. PMID 17517855.

Albo, Michael E.; Richter, Holly E.; et al. (May 22, 2007). "Results of the Sister Randomized Surgical Trial Comparing the Autologous Rectus Fascia Sling to the Burch Colposuspension". The Journal of Urology. 177 (4): 556. doi:10.1016/S0022-5347(18)31864-0.

Tennstedt, Sharon L.; FitzGerald, Mary Pat; et al. (May 2007) [October 12, 2006]. "Quality of life in women with stress urinary incontinence". International Urogynecology Journal & Pelvic Floor Dysfunction. 18 (5). Urinary Incontinence Treatment Network: 543–549. doi:10.1007/s00192-006-0188-5. PMID 17036169.

Mallett, Veronica; Burks, David; et al. (April 2007). "Solifenacin treatment for overactive bladder in black patients: patient-reported symptom bother and health-related quality of life outcomes". Current Medical Research and Opinion. 23 (4): 821–831. doi:10.1185/030079907x178847. PMID 17407639. ProQuest 207995486.

Mallett, V.T.; Brubaker, L.; et al. (March 2006). "Abstract for Oral Presentation 9: The Expectations of Surgical Patients: Are We Talking the Same Language?". Journal of Pelvic Medicine and Surgery. 12 (2). Urinary Incontinence Treatment Network: 68. doi:10.1097/00146866-200603000-00011.

Richter, Holly E.; Burgio, Kathryn L.; et al. (December 2005). "Factors associated with incontinence frequency in a surgical cohort of stress incontinent women". American Journal of Obstetrics and Gynecology. 193 (6): 2088–2093. doi:10.1016/j.ajog.2005.07.068. PMID 16325621.

Richter, H.E.; Burgio, K.L.; et al. (March 2005). "Predictors of Incontinence Severity in a Cohort of Stress Incontinent Women Undergoing Surgical Treatment". Journal of Pelvic Medicine and Surgery. 11 (2): 78–79. doi:10.1097/01.spv.0000156019.60072.78.

Mallett, Veronica T. (January 2005). "Female urinary incontinence: what the epidemiologic data tell us". International Journal of Fertility and Women's Medicine. 50 (1): 12–17. ISSN 1534-892X. PMID 15971716.

Tennstedt, S.; Borello-France, D.; et al. (2005). "Health-Related Quality of Life in Women Before Surgical Treatment for Stress Urinary Incontinence". Journal of Pelvic Medicine and Surgery. 11 (S1). Urinary Incontinence Treatment Network: S38. doi:10.1097/01.spv.0000178882.54258.8f.

FitzGerald, M.P.; Mallett, V.; et al. (2005). "Pelvic Muscle Strength Decreases with Increasing Age, Parity and Symptoms of Stress Incontinence". Journal of Pelvic Medicine and Surgery. 11 (S1): S15. doi:10.1097/01.spv.0000176106.35296.28.

Diokno, Ananais C.; Estanol, Maria Victoria; et al. (March 2004). "Epidemiology of lower urinary tract dysfunction". Clinical Obstetrics and Gynecology. 47 (1): 36–43. doi:10.1097/00003081-200403000-00007. PMID 15024271.

Northington, G.M.; Wilson, G.S.; et al. (2004). "Comparison of Graft Material as a Risk Factor for Mesh Erosion and Infection Following Abdominal Sacrocolpopexy". Journal of Pelvic Medicine and Surgery. 10 (S1): S61–S62. doi:10.1097/01.spv.0000134118.68352.cb.

Dolan, Lucia M.; Hosker, Gordon L.; et al. (December 2003). "Stress incontinence and pelvic floor neurophysiology 15 years after the first delivery". BJOG. 110 (12): 1107–1114. doi:10.1111/j.1471-0528.2003.02415.x. ISSN 1471-0528. PMID 14664882.

Mallett, Veronica T. (July 1, 2002). "The unspeakable illness: the work-up of female urinary incontinence". International Journal of Fertility & Women's Medicine. 47 (4): 162–168. PMID 12199412.

Graham, Carol A.; Mallett, Veronica T. (July 2001). "Race as a predictor of urinary incontinence and pelvic organ prolapse". American Journal of Obstetrics and Gynecology. 185 (1): 116–120. doi:10.1067/mob.2001.114914. ISSN 0002-9378. PMID 11483914.

McIntosh, Lisa J.; Stanitski, Deborah F.; et al. (1996). "Ehlers-Danlos Syndrome: Relationship between Joint Hypermobility, Urinary Incontinence, and Pelvic Floor Prolapse". Gynecologic and Obstetric Investigation. 41 (2): 135–139. doi:10.1159/000292060. PMID 8838976.

Mcintosh, Lisa J.; Mallett, Veronica T.; et al. (December 30, 1995). "Gynecologic Disorders in Women With Ehlers-Danlos Syndrome". JSGI. 2 (3): 559–564. doi:10.1177/107155769500200309. PMID 9420859.

Mallett, Veronica T.; Bump, Richard C. (August 1994). "The epidemiology of female pelvic floor dysfunction". Current Opinion in Obstetrics and Gynecology. 6 (4): 308–312. doi:10.1097/00001703-199408000-00002. ISSN 1040-872X. PMID 7742490.

=== Book chapters ===
Mallett, Veronica T. (1996). "96: Gynecologic Emergencies; 101: Common Complications of Gynecologic Procedures". In Tintinalli, Judith E.; Ruiz, Ernst; Krome, Ronald L. (eds.). Emergency medicine : a comprehensive study guide. American College of Emergency Physicians (4th ed.). New York: McGraw-Hill. pp. 555–560, 583–586. ISBN 9780070648791.
