= Nettie Langston Napier =

- Born: Nettie DeElla Langston; June 17, 1861; Oberlin, Ohio
- Died: September 30, 1938 (aged 77); Nashville, Tennessee
- Occupation: activist
- Spouse: James Carroll Napier (m. 1878)

Nettie Langston Napier (born Nettie DeElla Langston) was an African-American activist for the rights of women of color during the early part of the 20th century. She lived in Nashville, Tennessee.

== Biography ==
Nettie Langston was born June 17, 1861 in Oberlin, Ohio, into an upper-class family. Her father was John Mercer Langston, later the founding dean of the law school at Howard University, first president of Virginia Normal and Collegiate Institute, a historically black college, and the first black person to be elected to the United States Congress from Virginia. Her mother was Caroline Matilda (Wall), also a graduate of Oberlin. After attending Howard for a year, Nettie transferred to Oberlin College, where she studied music.

Her future husband, James Carroll Napier, was then working at the State Department and earned his law degree at Howard, where he met John Mercer Langston and his family. Napier returned to Nashville in 1872 to start a law practice. In 1878 he and Nettie married in Washington D.C., in a "predominantly white Congregational church". They adopted a daughter, Carrie.

Napier became a "prominent clubwom[a]n" in Nashville, and made important social connections across the South. She was part of a "southern network" of about a dozen upper-class women, including such prominent women as Maggie L. Walker, Mary McLeod Bethune, Margaret Murray Washington, Jennie B. Moton, Charlotte Hawkins Brown, and Lucy Craft Laney. She was a close friend of the educator John Hope, and was described as "the first lady of Nashville's black elite". The Napier household was known as "the undisputed center of Nashville's African American upper class".

Napier was one of a group of women who organized a chapter of the National Association of Colored Women in Nashville in 1897. In 1907 she founded the Day Homes' Club, an organization to support African-American children in Nashville. Josie English Wells was physician in charge. The Day Home Club founded Porter Homestead for children to attend while their mothers worked. The club also explored ways to improve education, healthcare, and temperance in the community. She was involved with Fisk University, and was invited by the local Red Cross chapter to work with them during World War I. She was treasurer of the National Association of Colored Women, leading the organization together with Margaret Murray Washington.

In 1915, during a decade when the national Young Women's Christian Association (YWCA) was considering expanding its services to colored women (its facilities would be segregated), Napier attended the organization's conference in Louisville, as the representative of Nashville. She wanted to establish a YWCA in Nashville for women of color.

In the 1920s, she became an Honorary Member of Zeta Phi Beta sorority.

In 1934 students of Tennessee State College's "negro history class" honored her and her husband with a pageant entitled From Africa to America.

Napier died on September 30, 1938, in Nashville.
