= Valerie Montgomery Rice =

American physician and college president

6th President of Morehouse School of Medicine
- Incumbent
- Assumed office 2014
- Preceded by: John Maupin

Personal details
- Spouse(s): Melvin Rice, Jr
- Children: 2
- Education: M.D., Harvard Medical School; BS, Georgia Institute of Technology

Valerie Montgomery Rice is an American college administrator and physician. She is the president and dean of Morehouse School of Medicine.

== Early life and education ==
A native of Georgia, she completed a bachelor's degree in chemistry from Georgia Institute of Technology. In 1987, she earned a medical degree from Harvard Medical School.

Intending to pursue a career as a neurosurgeon, her plans changed as she began her clinical rotation in obstetrics-gynecology rotation. Prior to this, Montgomery Rice recalls this rotation as being one she was not looking forward to. However, once in the rotation, Montgomery Rice was sure this was the field she was meant to be in. While conducting research at Harvard on using purified hormones to induce ovulation in mice, she received an acceptance letter from Emory University, her top choice university, to complete her residency. Before beginning her residency, Montgomery Rice's work had recently been published, thus recently making a name for herself.

In addition, at Drexel University College of Medicine in Philadelphia, she completed Executive Leadership in Academic Medicine Program. She completed a residency in obstetrics and gynaecology at Emory University. She also conducted a fellowship in reproductive endocrinology and infertility at Hutzel Women's Hospital.

== Career ==
Prior to joining Meharry Medical College in Nashville, Tennessee, Dr. Montgomery Rice held numerous leadership and faculty positions at the University of Kansas School of Medicine, becoming the catalyst of the institution's recognition for its high enrollment of minority women. While at Meharry Medical College, Rice founded and directed The Center for Women's Health Research. Being one of the first of its kind, The Center for Women's Health Research has a central focus on the impact of diseases for women of color, which aligns with Dr. Montgomery Rice's passion. Montgomery Rice served as professor and chair of the Department of Obstetrics and Gynecology, then dean and senior vice president, at Meharry Medical College. In 2011, She started at the Morehouse School of Medicine as the dean and Executive Vice President. In 2014, she became the president, becoming the first woman to hold the position.

Her clinical and research interests are in reproductive medicine, ovarian cancer and menopause. She has a record of research funding and publication. Montgomery Rice serves multiple professional organizations, including serving as chair of the American Medical Association's OB/GYN Section. She holds multiple teaching and research awards and is recognized for her professional and community service, notably for support of minority and professional women. Noticing a disparity between the maternal mortality rates in women, African American women in particular, her research in the topic of infertility was combined with her passion of providing better quality care for minority women. Her activities also reflect her interests in women's health issues, minority health care and health disparities.

== Awards and honors ==
Her research on infertility and maternal mortality rates awarded her membership of the Honor Roll of Outstanding Black Physician. This award is granted to black physicians and scientists who are deemed visionaries. The professionals who receive this honor are those who have overcome great adversity in the name of scientific advancement and social justice in their aid to individuals of color and needy and vulnerable individuals. Because of her dedication and passion to women's reproductive health with an emphasis on minority reproductive research, Dr. Montgomery Rice has been awarded multifaceted awards throughout her career including awards from the National Institute on Minority Health and Health Disparities and Office of Research on Women's Health/National Institutes of Health (NIH) advisory councils (2013-); Society for Women's Health Research board (2012-) and the executive committee (2013); March of Dimes board (2012-); Association of American Medical Colleges Council of Deans Administrative board (2012-); FDA Advisory Committee for Reproductive Health Drugs (2011-); American Board of Obstetrics and Gynecology, board examiner (2007-); Alpha Omega Alpha honor society (2006-); President's Commission on White House Fellowships Regional Panelist Selection Committee (2010); Every Life Matters, Every Dollar Counts Campaign chair, National AIDS Fund board of trustees (2009-2010); National Aids Fund board of trustees (2007-2011), Wal-Mart Healthcare Insights Panel chair (2007-2010); and Wal-Mart External Advisory Board (2006-2008). Montgomery Rice was presented an honorary degree from University of Massachusetts Medical School. She was elected to membership in the National Academy of Medicine in 2016.

== Personal life ==
While attending her undergraduate studies at Georgia Institute of Technology, she met Melvin Rice Jr. in the student section. Melvin Rice was selling concert tickets to a concert Montgomery Rice wished to attend that weekend, while also organizing the National Society of Black Engineers Conference. The two arranged a trade: concert tickets that Melvin had, for his entry into the conference Montgomery Rice was planning. They married and have a son and daughter.

== See also ==
- List of women presidents or chancellors of co-ed colleges and universities
