= James Whittico Jr. =

American physician

- Born: November 18, 1915; Williamson, West Virginia, U.S.
- Died: August 21, 2018 (aged 102)
- Alma mater: Lincoln University; Meharry Medical College
- Military career
- Allegiance: United States
- Branch: United States Army
- Rank: Lieutenant colonel
- Unit: 93rd Infantry Division (United States)
- Conflicts: World War II; Bronze Star
- Other work: Washington University in St. Louis

James Whittico Jr. (November 18, 1915 – August 21, 2018) was an American physician from St. Louis, Missouri. He was the first African American named a full clinical professor at any medical school in St. Louis and was the fourth African American in St. Louis to be named a fellow for the American College of Surgeons. Whittico was in the private practice of medicine specializing in surgery from 1952 until 2015.

== Early life and education ==
Born in Williamson, West Virginia, he followed his father, James Whittico Sr., into the medicine field. Whittico Jr. attended Lincoln University of Pennsylvania, the nation's oldest historically black university. He entered Meharry Medical College, a historically black medical school in Nashville, at the age of 19, and graduated in 1940. Following graduation he trained at St. Louis' Homer G. Phillips Hospital, which was the largest hospital that offered training for doctors of color.

== Career ==
Whittico was a clinical instructor of surgery at Washington University School of Medicine and served as chief of staff or chief of surgery at six different St. Louis hospitals.

He was Missouri's first African American to become a military hospital chief surgeon in active combat during World War II, serving in the Southwest Pacific Theater with the U.S. 93rd Infantry Division and rising to the rank of lieutenant colonel. He received the Bronze Star and the Meritorious Combat Service Ribbon.

In 1967, he served as president of the National Medical Association.

== Personal life ==
Whittico was a member of Chi Delta Mu.

Whittico retired from his private practice at the age of 99 after serving for 65 years. He died in August 2018 at the age of 101.
