= Lloyd C. Elam =

American psychiatrist

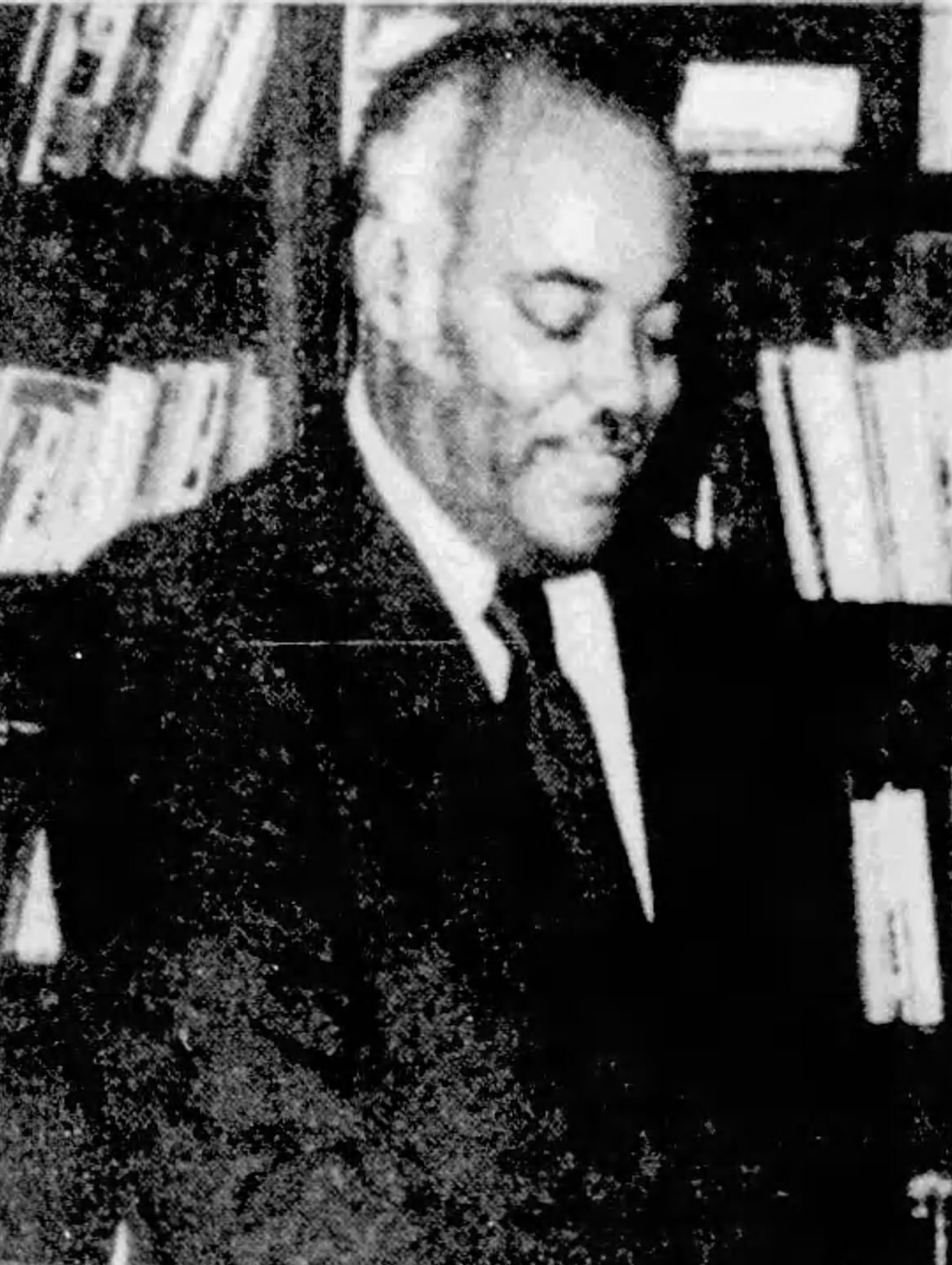
- Elam in 1977

President of Meharry Medical College
- In office 1968–1981

Personal details
- Born: October 27, 1928 Little Rock, Arkansas
- Died: October 4, 2008 (aged 79) Jackson, Mississippi
- Education: University of Washington School of Medicine
- Occupation: Psychiatrist

Lloyd Charles Elam (October 27, 1928 – October 4, 2008) was an American psychiatrist who established the psychiatry department and psychiatric residency program at Meharry Medical College, then served as interim dean before becoming president of the college from 1968 to 1981. Elam opened one of Nashville's first psychiatric day treatment programs.

A native of Arkansas, Elam attended college in Illinois before becoming the first black person to earn a medical degree from the University of Washington School of Medicine. He returned to Illinois for his psychiatry training, and he briefly practiced psychiatry there before joining the faculty at Meharry. Elam was president of Meharry during an $88 million capital campaign. He oversaw the expansion of the school's teaching hospital and the founding of a graduate school for health-related disciplines.

In 1981, with the college and its teaching hospital experiencing financial difficulties, Elam was dismissed as president, and he remained on the faculty until retiring in 1996. He received an honorary doctorate from Harvard University, and he served on the boards of directors for organizations including Kraftco, Merck & Co. and BellSouth Telecommunications.

== Early life ==
Elam was born in Little Rock, Arkansas. His father was a carpenter, and his mother insisted that the family walk to their destinations rather than riding segregated city transportation. Elam was 15 when he graduated from Dunbar High School. He was baptized at Christ Temple Church of Christ Holiness, and by the age of 17 he was the Sunday school superintendent there.

After attending a local junior college, he moved to Harvey, Illinois, where he worked at an automotive plant, and he took classes at Roosevelt University in Chicago. Graduating from Roosevelt in 1950, Elam served in the U.S. Army and then went to medical school at the University of Washington School of Medicine. He became the school's first black medical graduate in 1957.

Elam completed an internship at the University of Illinois and a psychiatry residency in Chicago, Elam joined the psychiatry staff at Chicago's Billings Hospital. In 1961, Elam became an assistant professor at Meharry Medical College and founded its psychiatry department. He started the psychiatry residency at Meharry and created one of the first psychiatric day treatment programs in Nashville. Elam was the psychiatry department chairman and the interim medical school dean.

== President of Meharry Medical College ==
Elam became president of Meharry in 1968. He oversaw an $88 million capital campaign in the early 1970s. He said that one of his goals was to triple the size of the student body, and he said that more than half of the money from the capital campaign would be used for faculty salaries and student scholarships. The college added new towers to George W. Hubbard Hospital, the school's teaching facility, and it constructed several other buildings. Meharry also established a graduate school for public health, biochemistry and other health-related fields. Subsequent president Wayne Riley described Elam as "the president who really built the modern-day Meharry." Meharry alumnus Frank S. Royal said that Elam "totally put a new face" on the school. He called Elam "a gentle giant of education".

In the early 1980s, George W. Hubbard Hospital was having difficulty competing in the Nashville hospital market. While only 500,000 people lived in Nashville at the time, the area was saturated with 4,000 hospital beds and two medical schools. Hubbard's status as a private, urban teaching hospital also complicated their financial situation. They were providing $3 million to $4 million in indigent care annually and were only receiving $725,000 per year in reimbursement based on their contract with the City of Nashville. They had to start turning away indigent patients.

By 1981, the college had defaulted on the $29 million loan to build the hospital, and it had just received a $7.8 million distress grant from the government. Hubbard had only 150 inpatients in the 405-bed hospital on an average day, and consultants from Hospital Corporation of America had been brought in to help with cost containment strategies. Some Meharry faculty members were also disgruntled with Elam's medical practice plan, the program under which a medical school physician shares their medical practice income with their institution.

That spring, the board of trustees dismissed Elam as president and named him the school's first chancellor. Several years earlier, Elam wanted to step down as president but the board had asked him to stay. The New York Times said that Elam did not want to give up his role at the time of his 1981 dismissal.

Elam was replaced on an interim basis by radiologist Richard G. Lester of the University of Texas Health Science Center at Houston, and the move generated controversy because Lester was Meharry's first white president in about 30 years.

== Later life ==
In 1982, Elam was a fellow at the Center for Advanced Study in the Behavioral Sciences. The same year, he became a Distinguished Service Professor of Psychiatry at Meharry, and he served in that capacity until 1995, when he became volunteer faculty at the school. He became an emeritus professor in 1996.

Outside of Meharry, Elam had significant community involvement. He was a member of the Urban League, the National Association for the Advancement of Colored People, and the Middle Tennessee chapter of 100 Black Men of America. In the early 1970s, he was elected to the board of directors of Kraftco, and he later served as a board member for numerous organizations, including Merck & Co., BellSouth Telecommunications, Fisk University, National Medical Fellowships, Inc., Tupperware, Inc., and the Alfred P. Sloan Foundation.

Elam taught Sunday school and performed community service through First Baptist Church, Capitol Hill in Nashville. Elam and his wife Clara had two children. He received an honorary doctorate from Harvard University, and in 1988 he received the Eleanor Roosevelt Key, which is the highest honor bestowed upon alumni of Roosevelt University. The National Conference of Christians and Jews gave him their Human Relations Award. He was honored at a Religious Heritage of America awards program.

On October 4, 2008, Elam died of an apparent heart attack in Jackson, Mississippi. He had begun to feel ill while driving to a meeting in Jackson. Though he asked someone for directions to a hospital, he was found unresponsive in his vehicle a short time later.

== Legacy ==
Meharry's Lloyd C. Elam Mental Health Center provides psychiatric services and substance abuse treatment. It opened in 1971 as the Meharry Community Mental Health Center, and it was renamed to honor Elam in 1991.
