= Morehouse School of Medicine =

Medical school in Atlanta, Georgia, US

Coordinates: 33.743°N 84.412°W

- Former name: School of Medicine at Morehouse College (1975–1981)
- Type: Private medical school
- Established: 1975
- Academic affiliations: Atlanta University Center
- Endowment: $141 million (2024)
- Chairman: Arthur R. Collins
- President: Valerie Montgomery Rice
- Dean: Sandra Harris-Hooker (interim)
- Students: 967 (2024–25)
- Location: Atlanta, Georgia, United States
- Campus: Urban
- Website: msm.edu

Morehouse School of Medicine (MSM) is an independent and private historically-Black medical school in Atlanta, Georgia. Originally a part of Morehouse College, the school became independent in 1981.

== History ==
MSM was established at the suggestion of several Atlanta community doctors who saw the disparities and outcomes for black patients in Georgia. They approached Morehouse College president Hugh Gloster, who formed a committee led by Joseph N Gayles, Jr., in 1970, to analyze the feasibility of a medical school as part of the Atlanta University Center complex campus, that included Clark Atlanta University, Interdenominational Theological Center, Morehouse College, Morris Brown College, and Spelman College.

In 1975, the School of Medicine at Morehouse College opened its doors and Louis W. Sullivan served as the inaugural dean. The first students were admitted in 1978, to a two-year program in the basic sciences, and transferred to other medical schools for the clinical years of their training.

=== Independent institution ===
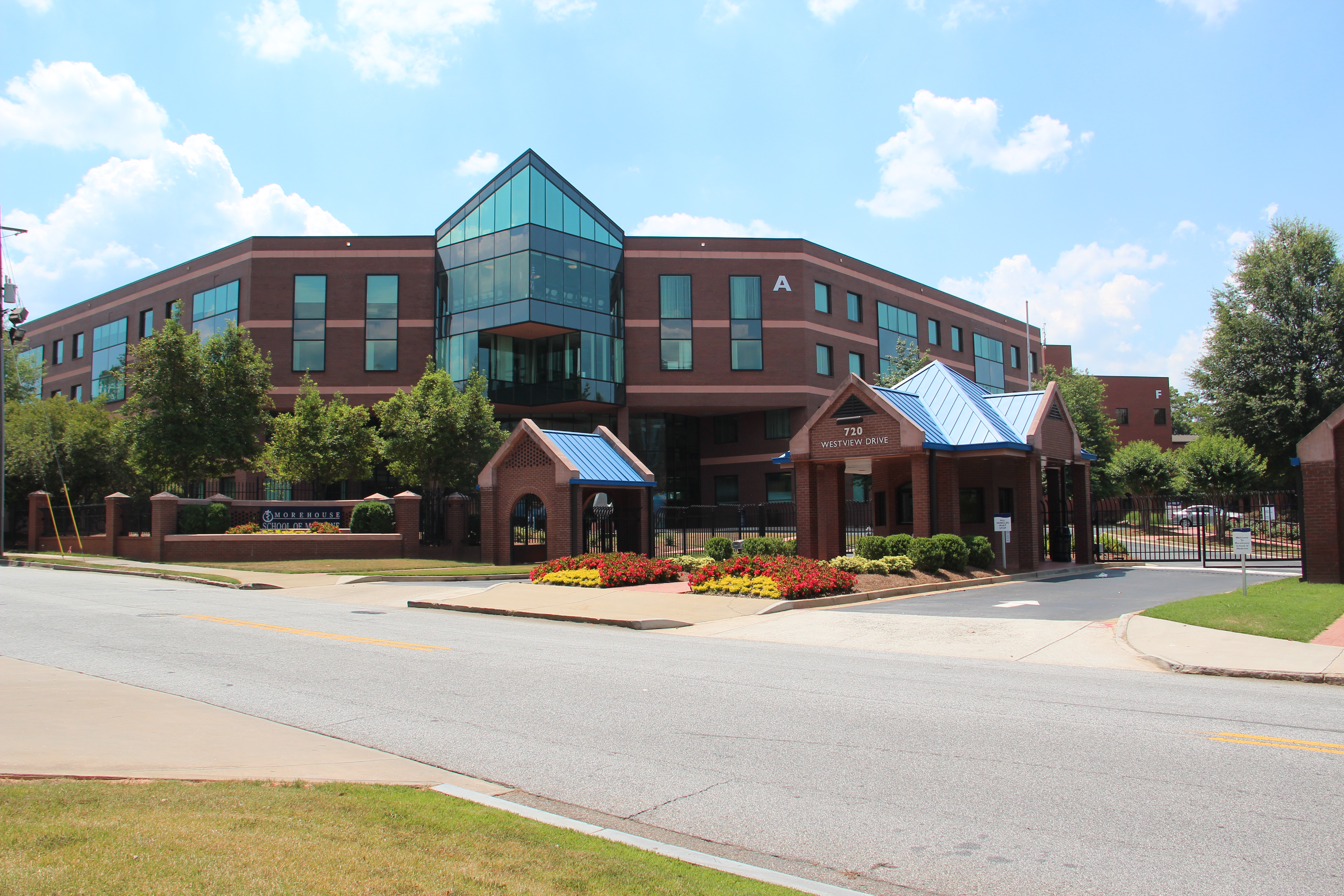
Louis W. Sullivan National Center for Primary Care

The institution became independent from Morehouse College in 1981, with Sullivan as president, and was fully accredited to award M.D. degrees in 1985. Initially, third-year clinical courses were taught by faculty from Emory University's School of Medicine, but since 1990, the school has taught them itself. In 1989, Sullivan was appointed United States Secretary of Health and Human Services by President George H. W. Bush. Sullivan served in that role for Bush's entire term, until 1993, when he returned to MSM to begin his second tenure as president.

Sullivan remained president until 2002. He now holds the title of president emeritus.

In 1982, Charles S. Finch III joined the faculty of Morehouse School of Medicine as an assistant professor, and in 1989 he became director of international health at Morehouse until 2007.

Former US surgeon general David Satcher served as director of the National Center for Primary Care at the Morehouse School of Medicine. He continued in that role while also serving as MSM's president from 2004 to 2006.

On February 28, 2006, Morehouse School of Medicine announced the appointment of John E. Maupin Jr., D.D.S. as the institution's next president. Maupin departed from his position of president at Meharry Medical College.

Valerie Montgomery Rice was named the sixth president of the school and the first woman to lead the free-standing medical institution in July 2014. In addition to president, she also retains the deanship. Montgomery Rice is a renowned infertility specialist and researcher, and most recently served as dean and executive vice president of MSM, where she served since 2011. In this role, she led MSM’s widespread academic and clinical programs in health sciences and led its strategic planning initiatives for patient care, research and community engagement.

On February 3, 2009, Eric Holder, then-vice chairman of MSM's board of trustees, was confirmed as U.S. Attorney General.

On July 13, 2009, President Barack Obama nominated Morehouse School of Medicine alumna and Trustee Regina Benjamin as U.S. Surgeon General.

A 2010 study ranked MSM as the number one medical school in the country in the terms of social mission. The social mission score used in the study evaluated schools on percentage of graduates who practice primary care, work in health professional shortage areas, and are underrepresented minorities.

In 2017, it was announced MSM would complete a $50 million expansion by 2020. The expansion will include its first-ever student housing, an ambulatory care center, additional parking, and a retail component.

In July 2020, MSM received a $40 million grant from the United States Department of Health and Human Services to help redress the alarming COVID-19 pandemic impact on African-Americans and other more vulnerable communities. In September 2020, MSM received $26.3 million from philanthropist Michael Bloomberg to help lower debt for the medical students enrolled.

In December 2020, MSM partnered with CommonSpirit Health to form the More in Common Alliance. It is a ten-year initiative to help reduce health inequity. Dr. Veronica Mallett serves as the senior vice president and chief administrative officer as of August 2023. One of her tasks is to match the $100 million commitment CommonSpirit Health has made toward the program. Research programs are a part of the effort to increase health equity.

In May 2022, MSM had a groundbreaking ceremony for a new $45 million academic facility. The 52,300-square foot building is scheduled to be complete in early 2024. The building is named after longtime MSM board member and state lawmaker Calvin Smyre.

In 2024, Morehouse School of Medicine received a $175 million gift from Bloomberg Philanthropies to support the school’s endowment.

=== Student body ===
In 2022, the student body at MSM was 70% Black and 66% women. Medical College Admission Test (MCAT) scores are thought to pose a significant barrier to the number of African American matriculants to US medical schools. Between 2009 and 2014, Morehouse School of Medicine accepted students with MCAT scores below the national matriculant mean, but then raised their subsequent performance on the US Medical Licensing Examination Step 1 one standard deviation above the scores predicted by their MCAT and undergraduate grade point average.

=== Presidents ===
Presidents of Morehouse School of Medicine
President	Tenure (years)
Louis W. Sullivan	1981 – 1989
James A. Goodman	1989 – 1992
Louis W. Sullivan	1993 – 2002
James Gavin III	2002 – 2004
David Satcher	2004 – 2006
John Maupin	2006 – 2014
Valerie Montgomery Rice	2014 – present

== See also ==
- Atlanta University Center
- Joseph N. Gayles Jr.
