= Thomas E. Jones (doctor) =

Dr. Thomas Edward Jones
- Born: May 26, 1880; Lynchburg, Virginia, US
- Died: April 4, 1958 (aged 77); Washington, D.C., US
- Burial place: Arlington National Cemetery
- Military career
- Branch: United States National Guard (1914–1917); United States Army (1917–1918)
- Service years: 1914–1918
- Rank: Captain
- Unit: 92nd Infantry Division
- Awards: Croix de Guerre; Distinguished Service Cross

Thomas Edward Jones was an African-American medical doctor and captain in the United States Army who was awarded both the French Croix de Guerre and American Distinguished Service Cross for his actions during the First World War.

== Early life ==
Jones was born on May 26, 1880, in Lynchburg, Virginia to Campbell and Emma Jones. Campbell Jones had been a green grocer. He graduated from Lynchburg High School in 1896 and went on to receive an undergraduate education from Howard University in Washington, D.C. Jones married Leonie Annette Sinkler on April 3, 1901, while he was still attending school and working as a watchman in government service. He entered the Howard University Medical School in 1908 and graduated with an M.D. degree in 1912. Jones then served as an intern at Freedmen's Hospital until October 1, 1913, when he was appointed the hospital's anesthetist, a position he held until 1917.

== Military service ==
As early as 1914, Jones was serving as a lieutenant in Company C of the First Separate Battalion of the District of Columbia National Guard. When the United States entered World War I in 1917, Jones volunteered for the Army Medical Reserve Corps and received sixty days of training at Fort Des Moines. On November 3, 1917, he was sent to Camp Meade, Maryland, to join the 368th Infantry Regiment of the 92nd Infantry Division.

Jones was awarded the Croix de Guerre and Distinguished Service Cross for his actions near Binarville, France, during the Meuse-Argonne Offensive. On September 27, 1918, he "went into an open area subjected to direct machinegun fire to care for a wounded soldier who was being carried by another officer. While dressing the wounded runner, a machinegun bullet passed between his arms and his chest and a man was killed within a few yards of him. For this action he was promoted to captain, making him one of a handful of black officers in World War I."

== Post-war career ==
After the war, Jones returned to Washington D.C., where he served as Resident Assistant Surgeon at Freedmen's Hospital from 1919 to 1921, when he became assistant surgeon-in-chief. In 1936, he was promoted to surgeon-in-chief, a position he held until his retirement in 1942. He was a member of the National Medical Association, the National Association for the Advancement of Colored People, and the Alpha Phi Alpha and Chi Delta Mu fraternities. Jones was also part of the Legion of Valor and the James E. Walker Post of the American Legion.

== Death and legacy ==
After a long period of illness, Jones died of a coronary thrombosis on April 4, 1958. He was buried with full military honors at Arlington National Cemetery, next to Leonie, his first wife.

== Personal life ==
Dr. Jones married Leonie Sinkler (1879–1939) in 1901. He remarried in May 1940 to Minerva Jenkins Jones, which lasted until his death. Dr. Jones had three children, Jeanette M., Emma Jane, and Thomas E. Jr.
