= Journal of Health Care for the Poor and Underserved =

- Discipline: Medicine, health, economics, politics
- Language: English
- Edited by: Virginia Brennan

Publication details
- History: 1990–present
- Publisher: Johns Hopkins University Press for Meharry Medical College (United States)
- Frequency: Quarterly

Standard abbreviations
- ISO 4: J. Health Care Poor Underserved

Indexing
- ISSN: 1049-2089 (print); 1548-6869 (web)
- OCLC no.: 39082573

Links
- Journal homepage; Online access

The Journal of Health Care for the Poor and Underserved is an academic journal founded in 1990 by David Satcher, then President of Meharry Medical College who later became the 16th Surgeon General of the United States. JHCPU is published by the Johns Hopkins University Press for Meharry and is affiliated with the Association of Clinicians for the Underserved.

The journal covers the health and health care of medically underserved populations in North and Central America, the Caribbean, and sub-Saharan Africa, as well as internally dispossessed Indigenous populations worldwide. The topical scope is broad covering such areas as the epidemiology of inequities, structural racism, social determinants of health, quality, costs, regulation, legislation, and disease prevention. Articles primarily take the form of scholarly research, as well as policy analyses and book reviews.

The current editor is Virginia Brennan of Meharry Medical College. The journal is published quarterly in February, May, August, and November, with occasional supplemental issues. It is listed as one of the nation's leading Health Policy journals by the Kaiser Family Foundation and as an essential core journal in Public Health Practice by the Medical Library Association's Core Public Health Journals Project.

== See also ==
- Health equity
- Health inequities
- Health disparities
- Health care delivery
- Health care system
- Meharry Medical College
- Historically Black Colleges and Universities
