= Tameka A. Clemons =

American biochemist

- Education: Meharry Medical College
- Known for: UPC2 and amylin signaling in diabetes and neurodegeneration
- Awards: CellPress 100 Inspiring Black scientists in America, Research Initiation Award National Science Foundation, Inaugural Recipient of the Alfred P. Sloan Foundation Minority Ph.D. Program
- Scientific career
- Fields: Biochemistry
- Workplaces: Tilman J. Fertitta Family College of Medicine University of Houston

Tameka A. Clemons is an African American biochemist at Tilman J. Fertitta Family College of Medicine at University of Houston in Houston, Texas. Clemons holds the title of Clinical Associate Professor of Biochemistry in the Department of Biomedical Sciences. Her research focuses on exploring the link between Type II diabetes and Alzheimer's disease by analyzing the aberrant biochemical signaling networks in pancreatic beta-cells and neuronal cells that leads to cell death in Type II diabetes and Alzheimer's Disease. Clemons was one of the inaugural recipients of the Alfred P. Sloan Foundation Minority Ph.D. Program Fellowship and in 2020, she was named one of the top 100 Inspiring Black Scientists in America by CellPress.

== Early life and education ==
In 1998, Clemons pursued her graduate training in biochemistry at Meharry Medical College in Nashville, Tennessee. Clemons studied in the department of biochemistry under the mentorship of Oksoon H. Choi. In 1999, she was one of 22 scholars to receive the inaugural Alfred P. Sloan Foundation Minority Ph.D. Program Fellowship and become a Sloan Fellow. From 2000 to 2002, Clemons successfully received the National Institutes of Health Predoctoral Individual National Research Service Award each year, as a part of the Minority Predoctoral Fellowship Program. During her PhD, Clemons explored the mechanisms by which IgE stimulation leads to calcium influx in mast cells and release of cytokines that result in allergy symptoms. She hypothesized that membrane associated sphingosine kinase (SK) signalling, leading to downstream sphingosine 1-phosphate release in the endoplasmic reticulum) is responsible for calcium mobilization in mast cells, in addition to the IP3 mediated mechanisms that had been already discovered. Clemons and her team at Meharry found that both IP3 and SK signalling are required for calcium mobilization after antigen binding to mast cells and they also found that SK signalling alone would not be sufficient to mobilize calcium. Clemons thesis was titled "Effects of sphingosine 1-phosphate in FcεRI-mediated Ca2^{+} response". Clemons completed her PhD studies in 2003.

== Career and research ==
In 2004, while living in metro Atlanta, Georgia she founded the Clayton/Henry county chapter of Alpha Kappa Alpha sorority incorporated. In 2015, Clemons became an assistant professor of biochemistry in the department of biomedical sciences at Western Michigan University Homer Stryker M.D. School of Medicine. Clemons collaborated with Luis H. Toledo-Pereyra at Western Michigan University Homer Stryker M.D. School of Medicine, to publish a manuscript on the effects of hydroxyl radicals after ischemia perfusion. Dr. Clemons worked here for one year before becoming an assistant professor in the department of chemistry and biochemistry at Spelman College in Atlanta, Georgia. While at Spelman, Clemons taught many undergraduate classes, including general chemistry, biochemistry, undergraduate research in chemistry, and advanced biochemistry.

In 2020, Clemons was recruited back to her alma mater, Meharry Medical College, as an assistant professor of biochemistry.

In 2023, Clemons accepted a position at Tilman J. Fertitta Family College of Medicine at University of Houston.

Clemons is actively involved in education and mentorship. In 2018, as a principal investigator at Spelman College, Clemons was a part of the NASA Technology Infusion Road Tour for historically black colleges and universities and minority-serving institutions. From 2019-2022, she has been a speaker at the Annual Biomedical Research Conference for Minority Students (AMBRCMS) on the topic of “Post Baccalaureate Programs, Tips for Submitting a Successful Application, and Advice on Taking a Gap Year”. and in 2022 she was invited as the University of Michigan Cellular & Molecular Biology (CMB) program annual retreat keynote speaker. Clemons is also an associate member of the Georgia State University Center for Neuroinflammation and Cardiometabolic Diseases.

=== Beta-cell dysfunction ===
Clemons investigates the aberrant biochemical signaling pathways that result in beta-cell death in Type 2 Diabetes. She seeks to understand how amylin and uncoupling protein 2 (UPC2) function in both health and disease. By investigating the role of UPC2, known to suppress the impact of free radicals, on amylin function, Clemons will uncover how beta-cell death might be prevented. This work extends to the field of neurodegeneration, as Clemons also hopes to explore how UCP2 could be used to control the functions of amylin in neurons to prevent degeneration.

== Awards and honors ==
- 2020 CellPress 100 Inspiring Black scientists in America
- 2019 Selected for Accomplishing Career Transitions Program through the American Society for Cell Biology
- 2018 Research Initiation Award National Science Foundation - Network of Minority Health Research Investigators
- 2000-2002 Minority Predoctoral Fellowship Program
- 1999 Inaugural Recipient of the Alfred P. Sloan Foundation Minority Ph.D. Program

== Select publications ==
- Clemons TA, Toledo-Pereyra LH. Hexokinase: A Glycolytic Enzyme with an Inflammatory Ischemia and Reperfusion Connection. J Invest Surg. 2015;28(6):301-302. doi:10.3109/08941939.2015.1121674
- Lee HS, Park CS, Lee YM, Suk HY, Clemons TC, Choi OH. Antigen-induced Ca2+ mobilization in RBL-2H3 cells: role of I(1,4,5)P3 and S1P and necessity of I(1,4,5)P3 production. Cell Calcium. 2005;38(6):581-592. doi:10.1016/j.ceca.2005.08.002
