= Emma Rochelle Wheeler =

African American physician

Emma Rochelle Wheeler was an influential African American physician in the city of Chattanooga, Tennessee, known for opening and operating Walden Hospital with her husband. There, they had inpatient rooms, surgery wings, and a nursing school. She was an organizer of the Pi Omega chapter of Alpha Kappa Alpha.

== Early life ==
Wheeler was born on February 7, 1882, in Gainesville, Florida, to a wealthy veterinarian father and loving mother. During Emma's childhood, she fell ill from a problem of the eye and required treatment. Upon meeting her white, female physician, Wheeler developed a fast friendship with the woman.

== Education ==
Her interest in medicine began at the young age of six, and she followed her dreams of becoming a physician into young adulthood when she attended Cookman Institute in Jacksonville, Florida for her undergraduate education. She graduated in 1900 at age 17 and married her professor, Joseph Howard, temporarily halting her pursuit of a career in medicine. Howard died shortly after in 1901, so Emma took her then infant son to Nashville, Tennessee. In Nashville, Wheeler attended Walden University's Meharry Medical College, finally graduating in 1905.

== Career ==
After graduation, Emma, her second husband, and little Joseph moved to Chattanooga, Tennessee, where Emma earned the honor of being the first female, African-American physician in the city. Her education lead her and John to open Walden Hospital on the corner of East 8th and Douglas Streets in Downtown Chattanooga in the year 1915. The hospital had thirty beds with nine private rooms, a twelve-bed room, and three wings: Surgery, Maternity, and Nursery. Prior to the opening of Walden Hospital, African American patients were held and treated in the basements of the mainly white hospitals around town. Walden hospital served the black community fairly and gave them excellent medical care, and this made the hospital a booming success. The hospital was so successful, in fact, that Emma and John could afford to hire seventeen doctors and surgeons as well as two or three nurses and were able to pay off all of the building debt in three years.

Emma and her husband, John, also found the time to train young, aspiring African American nurses at Walden. During her time as a teacher, surgeon, and superintendent of Walden Hospital, Emma also founded the Nurse Services Club of Chattanooga. Members of the club paid a fee, and this allowed them a two-week stay in the hospital at any time, as well as the care of a nurse in their home after being released from the hospital. Her club offered pre-paid, reasonably priced healthcare for underprivileged African Americans in Chattanooga and was the first of its kind.

Tragedy struck in 1940 as Dr. John Wheeler lost his life fighting an illness in his own hospital. Emma continued her extensive work in the hospital alone. Wheeler doubled as a physician and a trainer for the nurses at the hospital for over twenty years, teaching in between seeing patients as a part of her vision for better medical care for all African Americans. The strenuous activity eventually took a toll on Wheeler and her health, and she decided to retire. On June 30, 1953, the hospital officially closed its doors to the public. Emma's health had declined greatly during her years at the hospital, but she continued her general medical practice up until shortly before her death in 1957.

== Death ==
Emma died on September 12, 1957, in Nashville's George W. Hubbard Hospital of Meharry Medical College. Her body was transported back to Chattanooga for burial in Highland Cemetery next to her husband, Dr. John Wheeler. In 1962, Chattanooga named its newest government housing development after Emma to honor her legacy of hope for African American nurses, doctors, and patients. Walden Hospital has since been renovated into apartments. A plaque outside of the building tells of Emma and her story.
