= Joseph N. Gayles Jr. =

Joseph N. Gayles Jr. (August 7, 1937 - October 2, 2008) was a chemist and President of Talladega College, best known for his work to found the Morehouse School of Medicine in 1975.

Gayles was born in Birmingham, Alabama, where he graduated Ullman High School in 1954. He earned a B.S. in chemistry from Dillard University in 1958, and a Ph.D. in physical chemistry from Brown University in 1963. In his early academic career, he held positions at Oregon State University and Uppsala University. He worked at IBM Research from 1966 to 1969.

In 1969, Gayles joined the faculty of Morehouse College. Soon thereafter, he was asked to investigate the feasibility of opening a new medical school there. He began a two-year feasibility study in 1970, which was followed by a federally-funded study in 1973. Gayles also gained the fledgling school $3 million in federal start-up funding. In 1977, he left Morehouse to serve as President of Talladega College, where he led the college's first successful capital campaign. As president, he emphasized fundraising and enrollment. He returned to Morehouse in 1983 as the Vice President for Institutional Advancement. In this role, he led the fundraising to support the Morehouse School of Medicine's development from a two-year program to a four-year school.

In 1996, he left to found the consulting firm Jon-Mon. His contributions to the founding of the Morehouse School of Medicine were recognized with an honorary doctorate in 2000. Gayles died in Atlanta on October 2, 2008.
