= Winston C. Hackett =

Physician (1881–1949)

Winston Clifton Hackett
- Born: 1881; Tyler, Texas, United States
- Died: 1949 (aged 67–68); Phoenix, Arizona
- Resting place: Greenwood/Memory Lawn Mortuary & Cemetery
- Spouse: Ayra Elberta Hammonds
- Children: Winstona Hackett Aldridge (1917–2017); John Prentice Hackett (1918–1925)

Dr. Winston Clifton Hackett (1881–1949) was the first African American physician in Arizona. He was the founder of the Booker T. Washington Memorial Hospital, which was the first hospital in Phoenix which served the African American community.

== Early life and education ==
Hackett was born in Tyler, Texas, where he received his primary and secondary education. He became a student of the Tuskegee University, a historically black university (HBCU) in Tuskegee, Alabama.

He continued his medical studies at the Meharry Medical College in Nashville, Tennessee, United States, where he graduated with a medical degree in obstetrics.

== Medical practice in Phoenix ==
Hackett moved to Phoenix in 1916 and established his medical practice in his home which was located at 729 W. Sherman Street. He thus became the first African-American physician in Arizona. In 1925, Hackett, his wife Ayra, and his two children moved to 1334 E. Jefferson Street. This was a time in the history of Phoenix when many African-Americans were often denied medical care because the city was segregated. Hackett also saw to the needs of white patients with socially stigmatized ailments who were denied medical care.

== Booker T. Washington Memorial Hospital ==
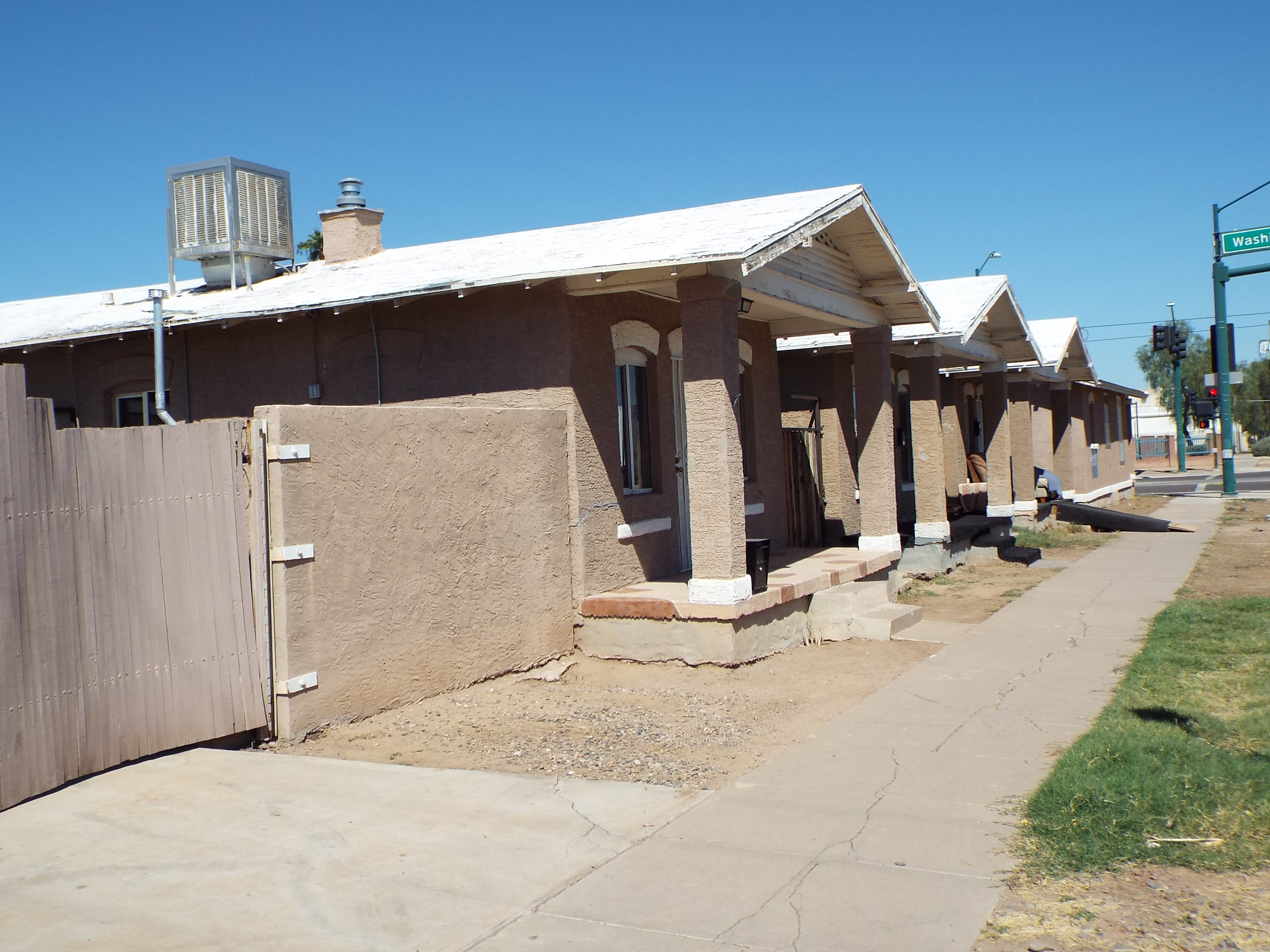
Three of the six cottages which Dr. Hackett had built for his TB patients

Hackett lobbied for the creation of an African-American community hospital but was unsuccessful. In 1921, Hackett purchased the residence of former Territorial Governor Joseph Kibbey which was located next door to his house at 1342 E. Jefferson St. In 1922, he established the Booker T. Washington Memorial Hospital a private medical in that residence. The hospital didn't have many beds at first and each bed was situated in the screened porch of the house. Hackett purchased three adjoining lots and was, therefore, able to expand the hospital. He also had six cottages built for tuberculosis patients. He charged his patients $12.50 to $35.00 per week for a hospital stay. Hackett opened a pharmacy nearby and recruited Southern African-American nurses with college nursing degrees to join his staff. One of the benefits which the African-American doctors and nurses gained from joining him was the opportunity to gain valuable experience in their chosen field.

Hackett’s hospital grew and soon had 25 beds. However, the hospital did not only dedicate its services to the African-American community, it served other races, too. There were many people seeking more affordable health care and there were those who needed clandestine treatment for sexually transmitted diseases. In 1927, the Arizona Republican (now the Arizona Republic) called it "The finest and most completely equipped hospital owned and devoted to the welfare of colored people west of the Mississippi".

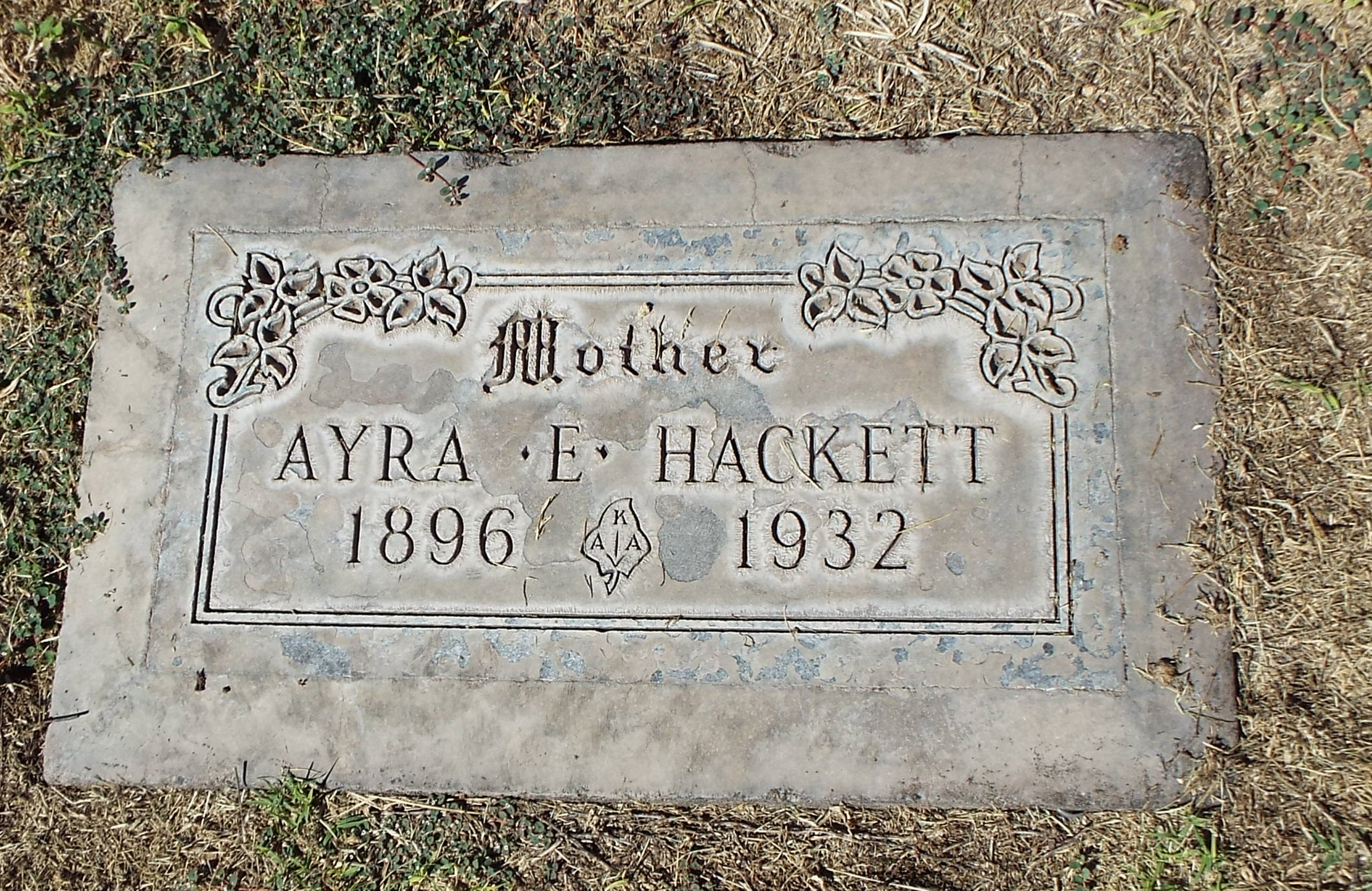
Grave-site of Ayra E. Hackett

Hackett's Booker T. Washington Memorial Hospital began to suffer economically when a nearby maternity hospital expanded to become a full-service facility. Other factors that had an influence on the hospital's economy were the unpaid bills of some of his patients and his failing eyesight. He had no other choice but to close the hospital in 1943.

== Winston Inn ==
Hackett converted the building where the hospital was once located into an inn which he named the "Winston Inn". The inn served and accommodated African-American servicemen during World War II and was frequented by many non-white educators, entertainers and athletes. This lasted until full racial integration was achieved in Phoenix during the Civil Rights era. Both the Hackett house and hospital building were eventually demolished.

== Family ==
He was married to Ayra Elberta Hammonds Hackett (1896–1932), also a native of Texas, with whom he had two children Winstona Hackett Aldridge (1917–2017) and John Prentice Hackett (1918–1925). Ayra assisted with the deliverance of newborns in their home for five years. She was also very active in the community. She founded a weekly newspaper, the Arizona Gleam, in 1929, which she published from their home. She was the only African American female newspaper owner in Arizona. She was also the president of the First Colored Baptist Church’s Baptist Young People’s Union (B.PY.U.). In 1932, Ayra was stricken with pneumonia. On November 13 of that same year she died in her home and was later buried in Phoenix's Greenwood/Memory Lawn Mortuary & Cemetery. Her newspaper, the Arizona Gleam, continued to be published until 1939.

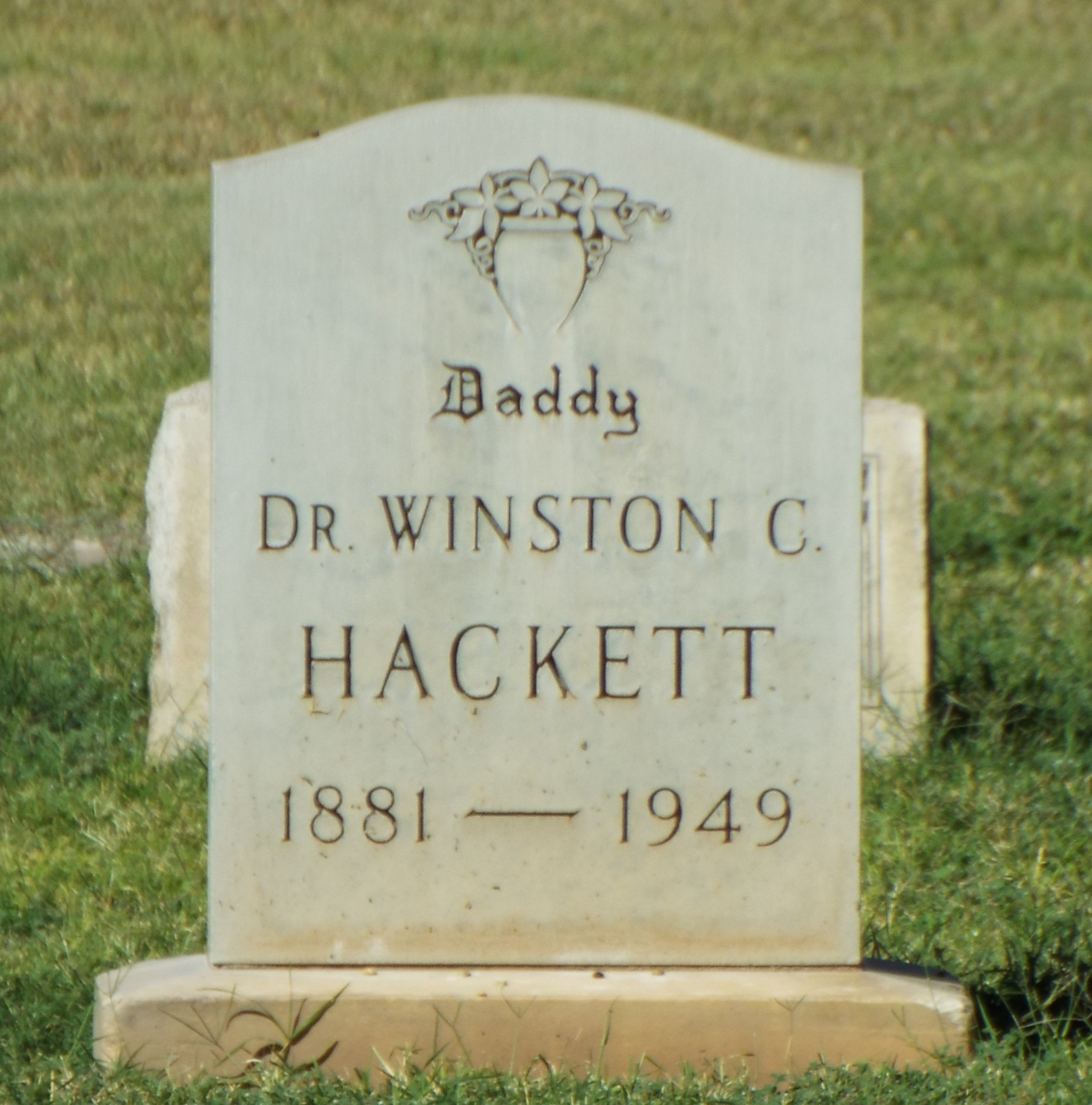
Grave-site of Winston C. Hackett

Hackett's daughter Winstona married Aubrey C. Aldridge in 1943. Aubrey C. Aldridge worked as a school principal at Dunbar and Bethune schools. Winstona, like her father, was very active in the community. She was a founding member of the Phoenix Chapter of The Links Inc., and a Diamond Soror with 75 years of service in the Alpha Kappa Alpha sorority.

== Later years ==
Hackett died on February 19, 1949, at the age of 67, and is buried in Phoenix's Greenwood/Memory Lawn Mortuary & Cemetery

== See also ==
- List of historic properties in Phoenix
