= Lillian Singleton Dove =

American physician

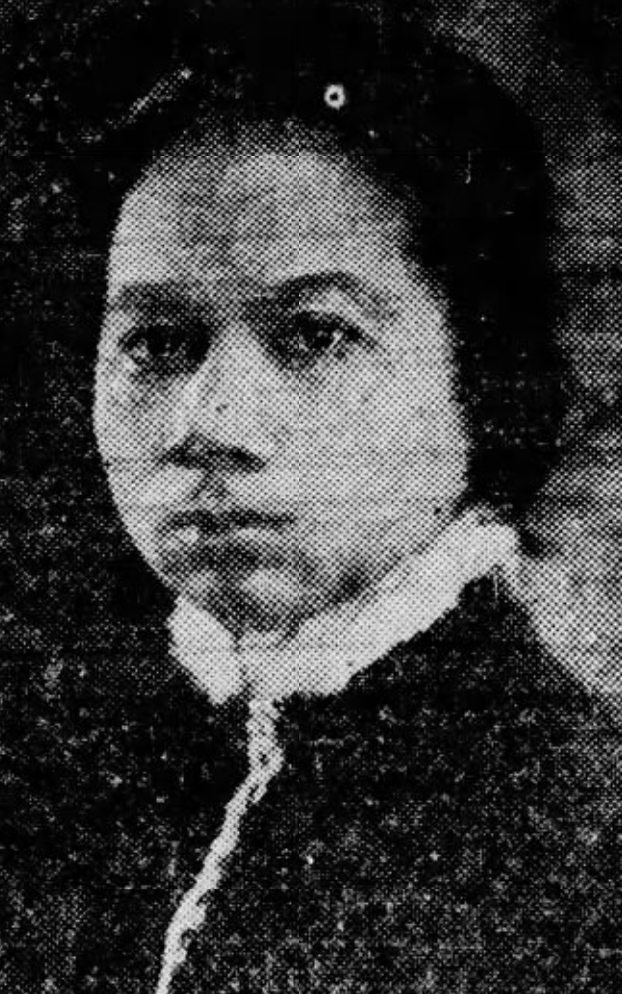
- Dove, from a 1930 newspaper
- Born: c. 1895
- Died: June 17, 1975
- Occupation: Physician

Lillian Singleton Dove (c. 1895 – June 17, 1975) was an American physician. Dove was an early African American woman physician and surgeon who first set up her own practice in Chicago in 1921. In addition to medical work, Dove was also involved in her community. She later moved to Glencoe, Illinois.

== Biography ==
Dove graduated from Meharry Medical College in 1917 and was one of the earliest African American women surgeons. Shortly after graduating, she worked for the Home Infirmary in Clarksville, Tennessee. Dove opened her own practice in Chicago in 1921 and was one of the first African American women physicians in the city. She was a chair on the Scientific Staff for the 1928 Woman's World's Fair, held in Chicago. Dove served on the Chicago mayor, Edward Joseph Kelly's, "Committee on venereal control" and served as the medical director of the South Parkway YWCA. She wrote health-related columns for the Chicago Defender. In 1933, Dove filed a patent for medicine that was meant "for the treatment and relief of common female ailments."

Dove became involved in the community of Chicago and headed a professional women's society which networked with local business owners. Dove was also a speaker on various topics in venues such as church gatherings and club meetings. She was also a member of the Douglass League of Women Voters and Alpha Kappa Alpha.

In 1946, Dove moved to Glencoe, Illinois where she became the first adult person of the Baha'i faith to live in the city. In 1954, Jet noted that Dove had obtained a "specially built station wagon" to use in case of an atomic bomb attack. Her plan was to flee West with her family.

Dove died at age 80 in Highland Park Hospital on June 17, 1975.
