= Anna Epps =

American microbiologist( (1930–2017)

Anna Cherrie Epps
- Born: Anna Cherrie; July 8, 1930; New Orleans
- Died: May 18, 2017 (aged 86)
- Education: Xavier University; Howard University; Loyola University New Orleans
- Occupations: Medical Technician, Assistant Professor of Medicine and Microbiology, Director of Medicine, Assistant and Associate Dean of Student Services, Dean of School of Medicine, President and CEO
- Employers: Xavier University; Howard University; Johns Hopkins University School of Medicine; Tulane University; Meharry Medical College

Anna Cherrie Epps (July 8, 1930 – May 18, 2017) was an American microbiologist known for her immunology research as well as her efforts to promote the advancement of minorities within the sciences, specifically medicine.

== Early life and education ==
In 1930, Epps was born in New Orleans to Ernest Cherrie Sr., a physician, and Anna Cherrie, a former schoolteacher. She attended Corpus Christi Elementary School and Xavier University Preparatory High School, both Catholic schools in New Orleans. Epps started studying at Howard University when she was 16.Howard University was the same college her father attended. In 1951, at age 19, she graduated with a Bachelor of Science degree in zoology. Following her goal to become a physician, she applied to medical school at Howard University as well as Meharry Medical College. Epps was denied admission to both, however, attributed to her young age and gender. From 1954 to 1960, she worked as an instructor and the acting head of the medical technology department at Xavier University. In 1959, Epps earned her master's degree from Loyola University in microbiology. In 1966, Epps earned her doctoral degree in zoology from Howard University College of Medicine.

== Research ==
Epps' early research at Howard focused on immunology, specifically the study of tropical and infectious diseases. Epps' research at Johns Hopkins, for which she was awarded a U.S. Public Health Service Faculty Research Fellowship, investigated immunology related to liver disease, stomach cancer, and alpha-1-fetoprotein.

In 1993, Epps was commissioned by the Institute of Medicine, National Academy of Sciences to write "Increasing Minority Participation in the Health Professions—The Problem of Under-representation and An Inventory and Analysis of Effective Strategies and Problems."

In addition to publishing journal articles and scientific reviews, Epps co-authored "An Act of Grade: The Right Side of History", a book detailing the history of Meharry Medical College over 133 years of its development.

== Career ==
Starting in 1953, Epps first worked as a technologist in the clinical laboratories of Our Lady of Mercy Hospital in Cincinnati and Flint Goodridge Hospital in New Orleans. In 1954, she became an instructor and acting head of the medical technology department Xavier University of Louisiana until 1961.

In 1961, Epps began work at Howard University College of Medicine as an assistant professor of microbiology. At the same time, she began doctoral research on immunological responses in chick embryos to grafts. She was awarded a PhD in 1966. In 1969, Epps began work as an assistant professor at Johns Hopkins University School of Medicine, where she was awarded a U.S. Public Health Service Faculty Research Fellowship.

After being awarded a second research fellowship in 1969 at Tulane University, Epps became an assistant professor of medicine in 1971. During this time, Epps extended the work she had done at Howard and developed MEdREP, the Medical Education Reinforcement and Enrichment Program. It is a summer program intended to provide minority students interested in a career in the medical field with opportunities to learn about a career in medicine and prepare them to become competitive candidates for medical school. In 1975, Epps became the Director of Medicine at the Tulane Medical Center. In 1980, she was promoted to the assistant dean of student services.

In 1997, Epps became the first female dean of the School of Medicine at Meharry Medical College. At the time, she was also the only African-American woman with a Ph.D. to become dean of a U.S. medical school. As of 1999, Epps was the interim vice-president for academic affairs at Tulane. In 2013, at the age of 83, Epps became the president and CEO of the School of Medicine at Meharry Medical College, possibly the first African-American woman with a PhD to lead a medical school. Epps spent sixty-two years working in medical education.

Epps died in 2017 and was funeralized by Auxiliary Bishop Fernand Cheri III at the Cathedral-Basilica of Saint Louis in New Orleans.

== Boards and committees ==
Epps held key appointments on boards and committees that reflected her commitment to improving the medical sciences for minorities.

Epps served as a member of the Minority Health Advisory Committee for the Centers for Disease Control, Department of Health and Human Services and the National Board of Medical Examiners. Epps was also an emeritus member of the Georgetown University Board of Regents.

== Awards and honors ==
In 1966, Epps was awarded a U.S. Public Health Service Faculty Research Fellowship while conducting research at Johns Hopkins University School of Medicine.

In 1969, Epps was awarded a second research fellowship to continue her work at Tulane University.

In 2008, The Anna C. Epps, PhD - Morris A. Spirtes, MD Fund was established by Dr. Jim Doty, who attended the summer MEdREP program at Tulane in 1975. This fund endows two chairs and funds scholarships to assist economically disadvantaged students and is one of the largest gifts made to the Tulane School of Medicine.

The Anna Cherrie Epps, Ph.D., Center for Educational Development and Support was established in 2007 at Meharry Medical College in honor of Dr. Epps efforts to foster excellence in teaching and learning medicine.

== Personal life ==
Epps was married to Dr. Joseph M. Epps. She was Catholic.
