= Josie English Wells =

American physician (1876–1921)

- Born: Josephine English; 1876; Holly Springs, Mississippi, U.S.
- Died: 20 March 1921 (aged 44–45); Nashville, Tennessee, U.S.
- Education: Meharry Medical College, 1904
- Occupations: Physician, activist
- Employer(s): Fisk University; Meharry Medical College

Josie English Wells (1876-20 March 1921) was an African American physician and one of three women to graduate from Meharry Medical College in 1904. She was the first female faculty member at Meharry, and the first woman of any race to open a private practice in Nashville, Tennessee.

== Early life and education ==
Josephine English was born in Holly Springs, Mississippi in 1876 to Berry English, a freedman and carpenter, and his wife Eliza.

In her earlier life, English worked as a nurse. She married George Wells, a Latin professor at Rust College, and the couple had a daughter, Alma. Soon after her birth in 1896, George Wells died, leaving Josie a single parent. Josie Wells then moved to San Antonio, Texas, in order to lead a nursing program at a hospital there. This was led by Dr. G.J. Starnes, a graduate of Meharry Medical College, who likely saw Wells' potential.

Wells entered Meharry's four-year medical program in 1900. She graduated in 1904, one of three women graduates. The school had only recently begun admitting women, with Georgia E. L. Patton its first female graduate in 1893.

== Physician career ==
Following graduation, Wells established a clinic for women and children that served the whole community, regardless of race. Hers was the first private practice in Nashville opened by a woman. She had two offices, one near Meharry and one in Nashville. Wells held free clinics families of limited means, and became the campus physician at Fisk University. Wells treated Black and white women, and specialized in treating women and children.

In 1907, she was appointed physician in charge for the Nashville Day Homes' Club, established to provide food and education for children left at home while their parents went to work. She spoke at club meetings, first talking about the struggles women faced while entering the medical profession and encouraging others to join, and also speaking about projects like supporting a local kindergarten.

Wells became the general physician for Walden University, which Meharry was originally part of, and became the superintendent for the training program for nurses at the nearby Mercy Hospital. During this time, Wells, along with John T. Wilson and Robert Fulton Boyd, Mercy's founder, organized Meharry doctors in protest against their institution. Wells said she was not treated equally to the other doctors, and Wilson wanted to be compensated better for his surgeries, while they all believed Meharry and Mercy's financial relationship was inequitable. This debate resulted in the 1912 founding of Meharry's Hubbard Hospital as a new teaching hospital.

Wells was also the first woman on the Meharry Medical College faculty, and played an active role in fundraising for Hubbard Hospital, to which her sister Mary was also a donor. Wells was secretary of the George W. Hubbard Hospital Association. When the hospital was built, she was named assistant superintendent, with George W. Hubbard the superintendent. She became its superintendent in 1912, though she had effectively "had charge" since it opened in 1910. She worked as the chief administrative adviser for Hubbard at this time as well. In 1915, she, Hubbard, and Chamian Hunt led the search for a new head nurse, eventually selecting Hulda Margaret Lyttle at Hunt's recommendation.

As well as her professional work, Wells was active in the wider community. During the First World War, she was part of the executive committee of the Colored Unit of the Women's Council of Defense, and actively supported women's suffrage. Wells' daughter, Alma, married John T. Givens, a scholarship in whose name is awarded annually to a student in the School of Medicine.

== Death and legacy ==
Wells had surgery to remove a goiter on March 19, 1921, and over the next couple days grew ill due to myocarditis. Josie English Wells died on 20 March 1921. She was buried in Nashville's Greenwood Cemetery.

In 2022, a historical marker was erected to commemorate Wells by The Historical Commission of Metropolitan Nashville and Davidson County. Efforts for the plaque were spearheaded by Sandra Parham, library executive director at Meharry Medical College.
