= Donna P. Davis =

African-American physician

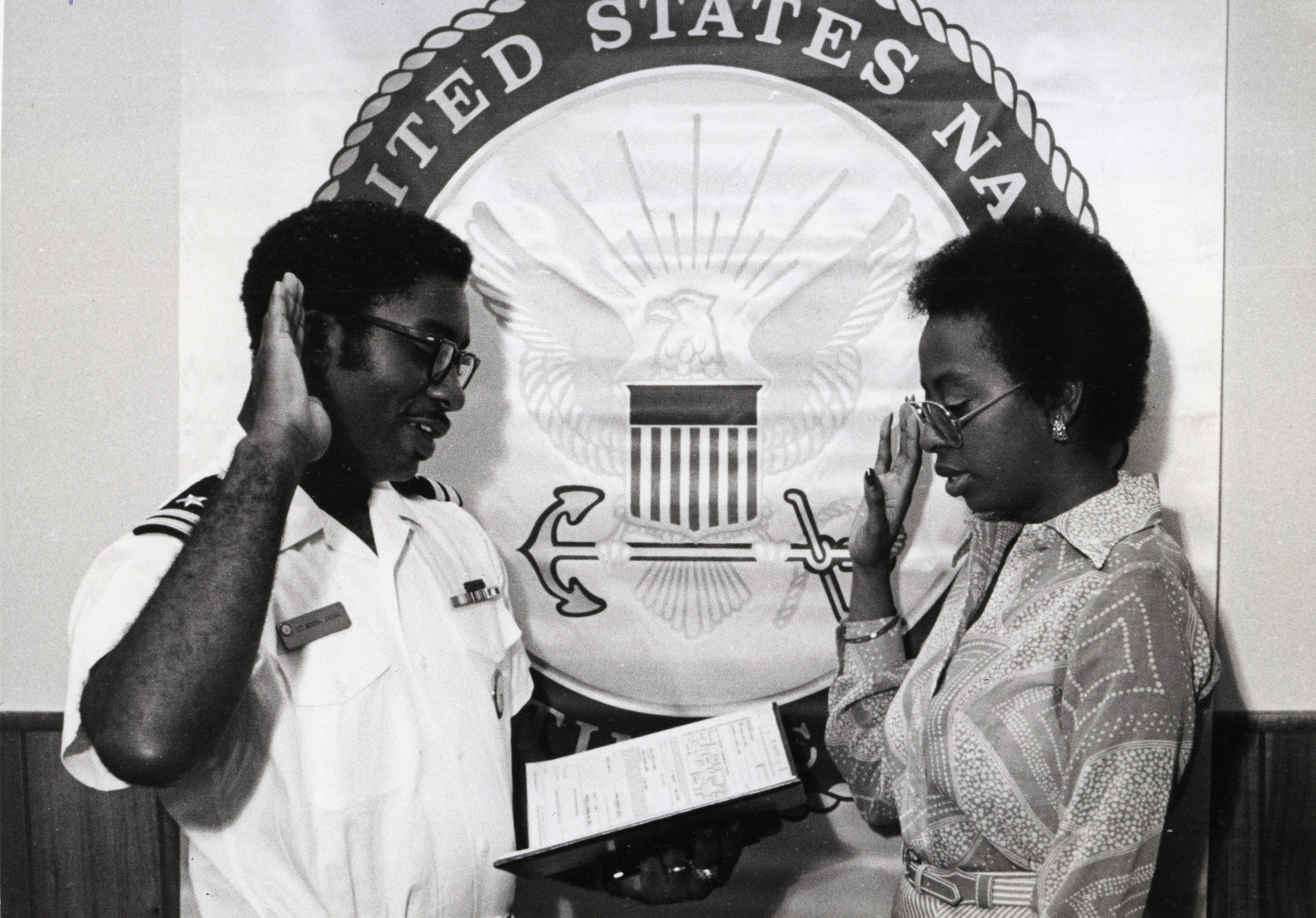
Donna P. Davis is sworn in to the United States Navy in 1975.

Donna P. Davis is an American physician who became the first African-American woman to enter the United States Navy as a medical doctor in 1975.

== Education ==
Donna P. Davis, a native of New York City, attended and graduated The Bronx High School of Science and earned her undergraduate degree at Cornell University in Ithaca, New York. After receiving her Bachelor of Arts degree, she then attended Meharry Medical College in Nashville, Tennessee. While studying at Meharry, she received countless awards including the Bache Scholarship, the Leopold Schapp Foundation Award, the C.V. Mosby Award in Medicine, and the American Association Medical College Fellowship in 1972. In 1973, Davis graduated with her doctorate in medicine and took on an internship at Harlem Hospital in New York City where she became educated in physical and psychiatric care.

== U.S. Navy ==
In 1975, Donna P. Davis became the first African-American female physician to enter the United States Navy when she was commissioned as a lieutenant on April 25 at the Navy Recruiting District in Jacksonville, Florida. Her first tour of duty was at the Oakland Navy Hospital in California.

== Family life ==
While at her first duty at the Oakland Navy Hospital, she met her husband James Hammel, who was also serving active duty there. Donna and James moved to Southern California in 1977 where they eventually had two sons, Grant and Damien. On September 16, 2020, her husband died at the age of ninety-five.

== Today ==
After leaving active duty, Davis opened her own clinic in Yorba Linda, California, where she still practices today.
