= Georgia E. L. Patton Washington =

American missionary and physician

Georgia E. Lee Patton Washington
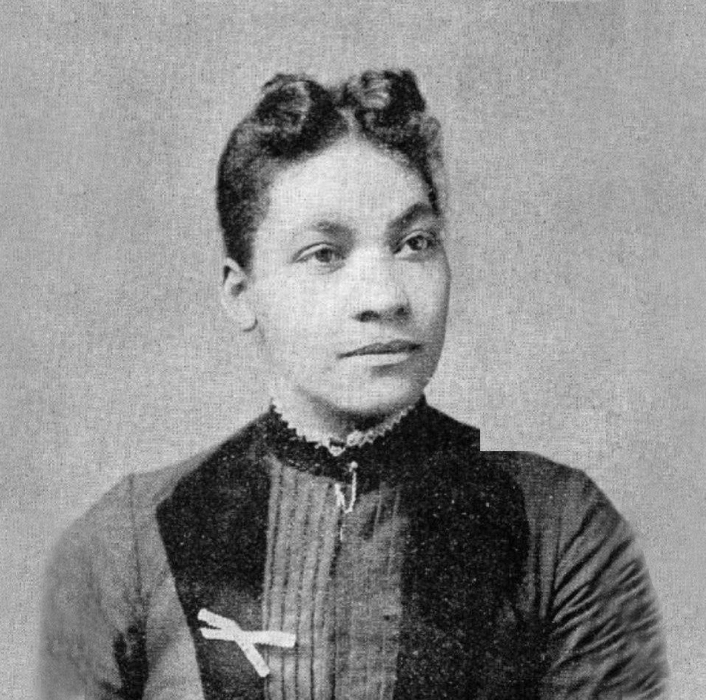
- Born: Georgia E. Lee Patton; April 16, 1864; Grundy County, Tennessee
- Died: November 8, 1900 (aged 36)
- Education: Central Tennessee College, Meharry Medical College
- Occupations: Physician, Missionary
- Spouse: David W. Washington (m. 1897)

Georgia E. Lee Patton Washington (April 16, 1864 – November 8, 1900) was an American missionary and physician. Following her education, she served as a medical missionary in Liberia. She was the first black woman to become a licensed surgeon and physician in Tennessee.

== Early life ==
Patton was born on April 15, 1864, into a family of slaves of the South of the United States. She had a twin sister who did not survive birth. Patton's father died before her birth. Although she was born in Grundy County, Tennessee, her mother decided to move to Coffee County in 1866.

Like the vast majority of slaves at the time, Patton's mother was sent away from her slave master who had grown rich from others toil, with nothing, forcing her to suffer from severe poverty. However, by diligence and working early in the morning and late at night, she managed to provide for all of her children and send them to the few months of school that were occasionally taught.

As the youngest of the family, Patton was often treated with favoritism and her mother would not allow her to engage in washing and spinning as her older sisters did. On the other hand, and because of her love for nature, she started learning the plowing trade from a very early age

At the age of sixteen, Patton's mother died, leaving her alone and forcing her to move to the home of one of her older sisters. After the death of her mother, Patton started to look for ways to become an educated woman

== Education and career ==
Although Patton was able to attend school, by the age of 17, she had only received 26 months of schooling.

A year after, she found what she thought to be the perfect path to achieve college education, working as a maid for a family. Unfortunately, Patton did not have the support of her older sister and soon after, she was forced to return to public school and the knowledge gained there only sharpened her aspiration for something higher

One day, after her sister gave her five dollars, she collected her most precious possessions and ran to Nashville and although after purchasing the ticket, she was left with less than two dollars, she believed that having God on her side, would help her to overcome any inconvenience. At the station, she met with her long-lost brother who was married and lived in Nashville, and went to his house. Her older sisters sent her eight dollars with which she was able to pay for the tuition and the necessary books for the months left of college

Despite the distance to her brother’s house and challenging weather conditions, she consistently arrived punctually for classes. Contemporary accounts note that she faced ridicule from peers because of mistakes and social awkwardness; nevertheless, she continued her education with the aim of obtaining a college degree.

After the school year had come to an end, she went to Kentucky and secured her place at a small school. This enabled her to attend college for a few months, in the following months, she had completed her senior course. After graduating from a literature course, she decided, unsatisfied with her usefulness, to start a medical course at the Central Tennessee College's Meharry Medical Department, becoming, a few years later in 1893, the first black woman to graduate as a licensed surgeon and physician in Tennessee

== Medical missionary ==
Patton was deeply attached to religion and was part of the Methodist Episcopal Church. Although she did not officially have the support of the church and had to bear the expenses of the trip, she decided to travel to Liberia as a medical missionary

After Patton arrived to Liberia on April 5, 1893, another African American missionary started to draw attention to the lack of professional health care in the country. Medicine such as quinine was already available, but there were no emergency doctors. During her time there, she identified anemia and dropsy as chronic ailments that mainly affected the Kru, the dominant ethnic group in Monrovia.

On her trip, Patton recognized the value of learning about native treatments to face the infections and illnesses that plagued the vast majority of her patients. In the search for a cure and an effective treatment for the Guinea worm, Patton developed the methods of "strapping" and "shafting", offering directions to other medical professionals about said techniques.

== Later years ==
After her two-year long experience in Liberia as a medical missionary, Patton returned to the United States in order to continue her education with a post-graduate course in medicine. During her return trip, she was infected with tuberculosis and never regained her previous health. She settled in Memphis and started a private medical practice, becoming the first black female doctor in Tennessee.

On December 29, 1897, she married lettercarrier David W. Washington, and two years later, in 1899, they had their first son, Willie Patton Washington, who died days after his birth. The couple had met through their active volunteering in their church and community. Patton was a very respected member in her community, for her monthly ten-dollar donation to the Freedmen's Aid Society and was often called "Gold Lady" due to her generosity.

In the last few years of her life, Patton worked sporadically due to her poor health. She died on November 8, 1900, in the city of Memphis, four months after giving birth to her second child, David W. Washington Jr, who died soon after his mother.

She is buried in Zion Christian Cemetery on South Parkway where an historic marker notes her accomplishments.
