= James E. K. Hildreth =

American immunologist and academic administrator (born 1956)

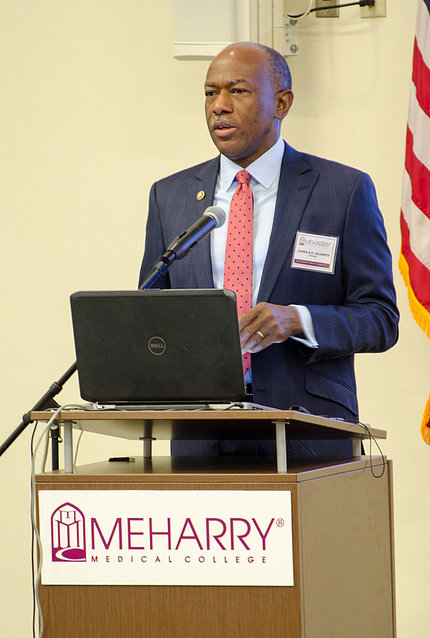
- Hildreth at Meharry Medical College workshop in 2018
- Born: James Earl Hildreth; December 27, 1956; Camden, Arkansas, U.S.
- Education: Harvard University 1979; Oxford University 1982
- Alma mater: Johns Hopkins School of Medicine
- Known for: HIV/AIDS research
- Spouse: Phyllis King (1980–)
- Children: 2
- Awards: Inductee, Arkansas Black Hall of Fame 2009; Frederick C. Greenwood Award 2012; Nashvillian of the Year 2021
- Scientific career
- Fields: Immunology
- Institutions: Meharry Medical College

James Earl King Hildreth (born December 27, 1956) is an American immunologist and academic administrator. Hildreth is the 12th president and chief executive officer of Meharry Medical College. He is known for his work on HIV/AIDS and was the first African American to hold a full tenured professorship in basic research at Johns Hopkins School of Medicine. Edward D. Miller calls Hildreth "one of the most influential HIV researchers in the world".

== Early life and education ==
James Earl Hildreth was born to Lucy and R.J. Hildreth on December 27, 1956, in Camden, Arkansas. The death of his father in 1968 of renal cancer inspired Hildreth to pursue a career in medicine. Hildreth read that students who graduated from Harvard University had high acceptance rates into medical schools, so he decided to attend Harvard for his undergraduate studies. He graduated top of his class from Camden High School and was accepted into Harvard.

At Harvard, he studied chemistry while working as a carpenter to pay for school. In October 1978, he applied to be a Rhodes Scholar and was accepted into the program. He was the first African American Rhodes Scholar from Arkansas. He graduated from Harvard with a degree in chemistry in 1979, magna cum laude. Later that year, as a Rhodes Scholar, he started attending Oxford University, where he studied the biology of cytotoxic T cells with Professor Andrew McMichael and became an expert in monoclonal antibody technology and cell adhesion molecules. The protein discovered by Hildreth as a graduate student was the basis for an FDA-approved drug, Raptiva, which was used to treat psoriasis. In 1982, he earned his PhD in immunology, and in 1987, he earned his medical degree at the Johns Hopkins School of Medicine.

== Career ==
After graduating from Johns Hopkins, Hildreth started his academic career as an assistant professor and earned tenure, making him the first African American in 125-year history of Johns Hopkins School of Medicine to earn full-time tenure in basic sciences at the university. He eventually became associate dean at the School of Medicine. In July 2005, he became the director of the NIH-funded Center for AIDS Health Disparities Research at Meharry Medical College. He was inducted into the Arkansas Black Hall of Fame in 2009. In 2011, he became dean of the UC Davis College of Biological Sciences. The following year, 2012, he was awarded the Frederick C. Greenwood Award for his work and research on HIV/AIDS in African Americans. That same year he was also awarded the Johns Hopkins University Alumni Association's Knowledge for the World Award. During his career Hidreth has trained 19 PhD students and several postdoctoral fellows, many of whom have continued successful careers in science or science-related areas. In 2015, he returned to Meharry Medical College as the president and chief executive officer. He is a recipient of the National Institute of Health Director's Pioneer Award, given each year to a few select scientists of exceptional creativity who use pioneering approaches to major biomedical or behavioral research challenges. He currently serves on the FDA's Vaccines and Related Biological Products Advisory Committee and as a member of the COVID-19 Health Equity Task Force appointed by President Joe Biden.

In March 2020, Hildreth proposed a COVID-19 testing initiative for minority communities, leading to Meharry running testing centers for the city of Nashville. Recognizing his leadership "at the forefront of Nashville's battle against the pandemic", the Nashville Scene has named Hildreth Nashvillian of the Year in 2021. He has made appearances in national broadcast and print media (MSNBC, CNN, Wall Street Journal, New York Times, NBC, Yahoo Finance, PBS, Modern Healthcare, and others) as an expert on COVID-19 science and disparities. He was voted one of the 100 Most Influential Healthcare Leaders by Modern Healthcare in December 2022.

=== Research ===
Hildreth's research focuses on preventing the spread of HIV/AIDS since the AIDS epidemic started in the early 1980s. His laboratory identified the adhesion protein LFA-1 to play a direct role in HIV-1-medicated membrane fusion and virus infection. His work has advanced the field with more than 100 peer-reviewed publications and 11 patents on this topic. The contributions have been very impactful. For example, the demonstration that HIV-1 adopts host proteins to exploit their function to its advantage, the observation that lipid rafts are involved in HIV-1 assembly and entry, proposed HIV-1 as a Trojan exosome, and natural pseudotyping enables HIV-1 to directly infect epithelial barrier cells in the female genital tract. In 1986, he began working on research to create a vaginal microbicide cream that blocks HIV infections, testing it in Zambia and South Africa in the 2000s. Hildreth has also worked in the Southern United States, where the majority of new HIV infected people are African Americans. His work has included working with local churches to educate Black communities about HIV.

== Personal life ==
Hildreth lives in Nashville, Tennessee. He married Phyllis King in 1980. They have two children.
