= Theresa Greene Reed =

American physician and epidemiologist

Theresa Greene Reed

Theresa Wilhelmina Green Reed (December 9, 1923 – July 10, 2017) was an American physician and epidemiologist. Reed worked as a staff and public health physician for around 18 years at the Homer G. Phillips Hospital. Later, she went to the Food and Drug Administration (FDA) where in 1968 she became the first African American woman to work as an epidemiologist.

== Life and career ==
Reed was born in Baltimore on December 9, 1923, and soon moved to Buffalo, New York. She graduated from Lafayette High School in 1941. Reed earned her bachelor's degree in chemistry at Virginia State College in 1945. Reed went to Meharry Medical College on scholarship, choosing that school to be closer to her fiancé. While the couple did not eventually marry, Reed went on to graduate in 1949.

She worked at the Homer G. Phillips Hospital as both a staff and public health physician starting in 1950. She met her husband at the hospital and married Hermas Reed in 1950. Theresa Reed was promoted to assistant clinical director in 1958, staying on until 1966. While in Missouri, in 1963, she became the first African American to serve as president of the Mound City Women Physicians Association.

Reed went to Johns Hopkins University to earn her master's degree in public health, graduating in 1967. In 1968, Reed became the first African American woman to work as an epidemiologist when she started working as a medical epidemiological officer at the Food and Drug Administration (FDA). In 1973, she was promoted to executive medical officer in the FDA. At the FDA, Reed worked as a supervisor for physicians who evaluate anti-infective medications for government approval. She also worked on other types of drugs, such as aminoglycosides and quinolones. Reed retired from the FDA in 1992.

She died in Montgomery County, Maryland on July 10, 2017, at the age of 93.
