= American Journal of Obstetrics and Gynecology =

- Discipline: Obstetrics and Gynecology
- Language: English
- Edited by: Catherine Bradley, MD, MSCE and Roberto Romero, MD, DMedSci

Publication details
- Publisher: Elsevier (USA)
- Impact factor: 8.661 (2020)

Standard abbreviations
- ISO 4: Am. J. Obstet. Gynecol.

Indexing
- CODEN: AJOGAH
- ISSN: 0002-9378 (print); 1097-6868 (web)
- LCCN: 38000517 a 38000517
- OCLC no.: 231009452

Links
- Journal homepage

The American Journal of Obstetrics and Gynecology (AJOG) is a peer reviewed journal of obstetrics and gynecology. It is popularly called the "Gray Journal". Since 1920, AJOG has continued the American Journal of Obstetrics and Diseases of Women and Children, which began publishing in 1868. AJOG has been Medline-indexed since 1965. The current editors-in-chief are Catherine Bradley, MD, MSCE & Roberto Romero, MD, DMedSci.

It is the official publication of the following societies and associations:

- American Gynecological and Obstetrical Society
- Association of Professors of Gynecology and Obstetrics
- Central Association of Obstetricians and Gynecologists
- Pacific Coast Obstetrical and Gynecological Society
- Society of Gynecologic Surgeons
- Society for Maternal-Fetal Medicine
- South Atlantic Association of Obstetricians and Gynecologists

The journal also publishes selected papers from the annual meeting of the American Urogynecologic Society.
