= Frank S. Royal =

American physician (1939–2026)

- Born: Frank Spencer Royal; September 15, 1939; Lynchburg, Virginia, U.S.
- Died: February 2, 2026 (aged 86); Richmond, Virginia, U.S.
- Education: Virginia Union University; Meharry Medical College
- Occupations: Physician, company director, civic leader
- Spouse: Pamela Royal

Frank Spencer Royal (September 15, 1939 – February 2, 2026) was an American physician, company director and civic leader. He was the chairman and president of the National Medical Association, an African-American medical organization.

== Early life and education ==
Frank Spencer Royal was born in Lynchburg, Virginia, on September 15, 1939, to Harry and Hazel Royal. He graduated from Virginia Union University in 1961, and he earned an MD from the Meharry Medical College in 1968.

== Career ==
Royal practiced medicine in Richmond, Virginia, from 1969. According to the Nashville Post, "Royal also served as chief of staff at Richmond Community Hospital and as an assistant clinical professor of family practice at the Medical College of Virginia." He was the president and chairman of the National Medical Association, an African-American medical association.

He served on the boards of directors of CSX Corporation from 1994 to 2008, SunTrust Banks from 1998 to April 2012, Smithfield Foods from 2002 to 2013. He was also a director of the Hospital Corporation of America.

== Civic activities ==
Royal served as the chairman of the board of trustees of Virginia Union University for three decades, and he was the chair of Meharry Medical College until 2017. He served on the board of the Robert Russa Moton Museum.

== Personal life and death ==
Royal had a wife, Pamela. He died in Richmond on February 2, 2026, at the age of 86.
