= Meharry Medical College =

Historically black college in Nashville, Tennessee, US

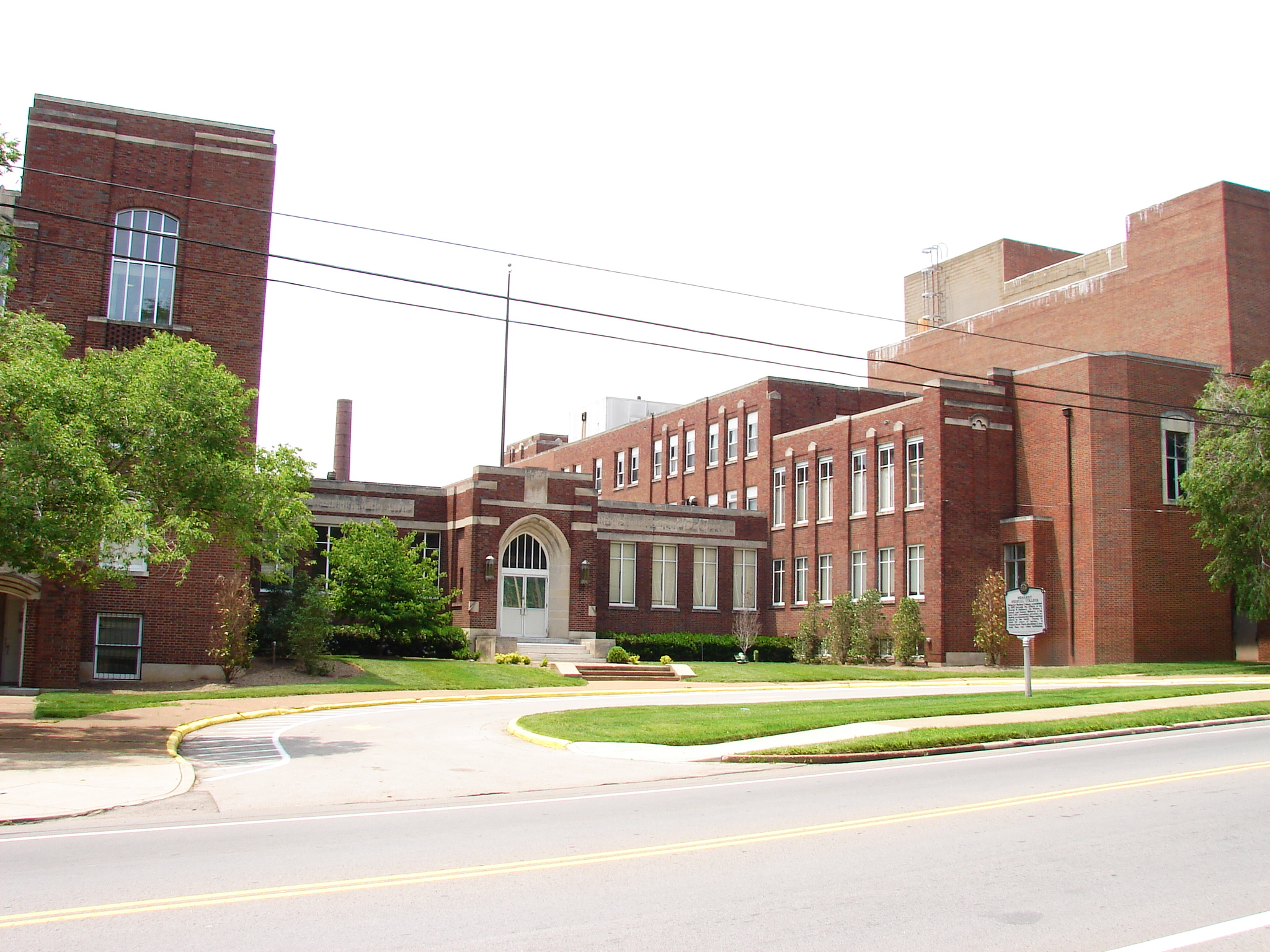
- Former name: Medical Department of Central Tennessee College
- Motto in English: Worship of God through Service to Mankind
- Type: Private historically black medical school
- Established: 1876; 150 years ago
- Religious affiliation: United Methodist Church
- Academic affiliations: ORAU
- Endowment: $193.9 million (2024)
- President: James E. K. Hildreth
- Students: 956 (fall 2021)
- Location: Nashville, Tennessee, United States; 36.167°N 86.807°W
- Website: www.mmc.edu

Meharry Medical College is a private historically black medical school affiliated with the United Methodist Church and located in Nashville, Tennessee. Founded in 1876 as the Medical Department of Central Tennessee College, it was the first medical school for African Americans in the South. While the majority of African Americans lived in the South, they were excluded from many public and private racially segregated institutions of higher education, particularly after the end of Reconstruction.

Meharry Medical College was chartered separately in 1915. In the early 21st century, it has become the largest private historically black institution in the United States solely dedicated to educating health care professionals and scientists. The school has never been segregated.

Meharry Medical College includes its School of Medicine, School of Dentistry, School of Graduate Studies, School of Applied Computational Sciences, School of Global Health, the Harold D. West Basic Sciences Center, and the Metropolitan General Hospital of Nashville-Davidson County. The degrees that Meharry offers include Doctor of Medicine (M.D.), Doctor of Dental Surgery (D.D.S.), Master of Science in Public Health (M.S.P.H.), Master of Health Science (M.H.S.), and Doctor of Philosophy (Ph.D.) degrees. Meharry is the second-largest educator of African-American medical doctors and dentists in the United States. It has the highest percentage of African Americans graduating with Ph.Ds in the biomedical sciences in the country.

Journal of Health Care for the Poor and Underserved is a public health journal owned by and edited at Meharry Medical College. Around 76% of graduates of the school work as doctors treating people in underserved communities. School training emphasizes recognizing gaps in health caring to improve health outcomes for all, including populations.

== History ==
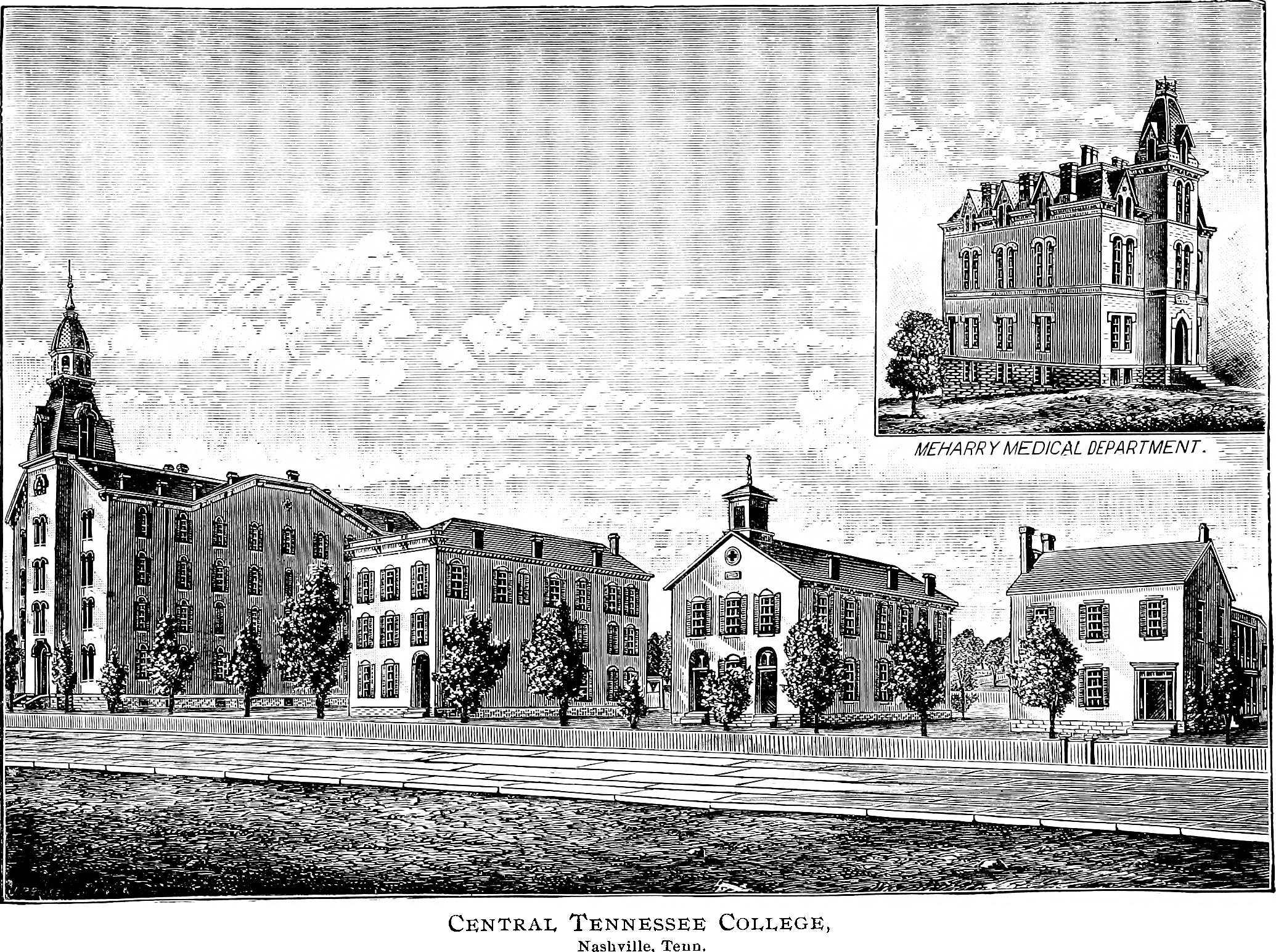
Central Tennessee College (CTC), with Meharry Medical College inset in top right corner, 1895

Meharry Medical College was one of six medical institutions established between the years of 1876 and 1900 in the state of Tennessee. These schools were founded after the end of the Civil War when slaves had been freed. Because of their former restrictions, there were as yet few African-American physicians, and many freedmen in need of health care. Because of segregation, most hospitals would not admit African Americans, and many white physicians often chose not to serve freedmen. During the late 19th century and into the early 20th century, most medical institutions accepted few, if any, African-American students. To combat this shortage of health care and the lack of accessibility to medical education, individuals, such as Samuel Meharry, and organizations, such as the Medical Association of Colored Physicians, Surgeons, Dentists, and Pharmacists (later renamed the National Medical Association), helped to found medical schools specifically for African Americans.

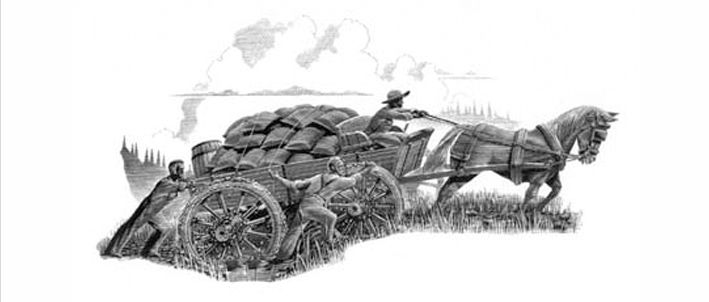
The Story of Meharry... An Act of Kindness

The college was named for Samuel Meharry, a young Irish American immigrant who worked as a salt and grit trader on the Kentucky-Tennessee frontier. After achieving some success, he and four of his brothers later made a major donation to help establish the college. As a young trader, Meharry had been aided by a family of freedmen, whose names are unknown. Meharry reportedly told the formerly enslaved family, "I have no money, but when I can I shall do something for your race."

Students at Central Tennessee College (CTC) approached the college president about setting up a medical school in 1875. The president, John Braden, approached Samuel Meharry to discuss the proposal. In 1875, Meharry, together with four of his brothers, donated a total of $15,000 to assist with establishing a medical department at CTC, a historically black college in Nashville, Tennessee. With the contribution of the Freedman's Aid Society of the Methodist Episcopal Church North, George W. Hubbard and Braden opened the Medical College at CTC in 1876 with a starting class of nine students. The classes took place in the basement of the Clark Memorial Methodist Episcopal Church. The first regular year of classes began in October 1876 and had eleven students in that group, with white physician William J. Sneed as their instructor. The medical program was initially two years long, but they added an additional year in 1879 and a fourth year to the course of study in 1893.

Hubbard, who completed his own medical degree at Vanderbilt University in 1879, served as the founding president of the medical college. The first student graduated in 1877. The second class, which had its commencement in 1878, had three graduates. In 1886, the Dental Department was founded, followed by a Pharmacy Department founded in 1889. The Dental and Pharmaceutical Building was dedicated on October 20, 1889. By 1896, half of all "regularly educated physicians then practicing in the South" had graduated from Meharry.

A nurse-training school was also developed during the 1900–1901 school year and the first class had eight students. A training hospital, Mercy Hospital, was built during the 1901–1902 school year. This hospital was replaced in 1916 and named the George W. Hubbard Hospital. Meharry Auditorium, with a 1,000 person capacity, was built in 1904.

In 1900, CTC changed its name to Walden University. In 1915, the medical department faculty of Walden University received a separate charter to operate independently as Meharry Medical College. The college continued to be privately funded. The Medical College remained in its original buildings, and Walden University moved to another campus in Nashville in 1922.

In 1910, Meharry absorbed medical students from Flint Medical College when that school was closed. Meharry also graduated a large number of women physicians for the time period, with 39 women having graduated by 1920. Its reputation suffered in 1914 when it was dropped to Class B status. Abraham Flexner of the General Education Board (a Rockefeller program) provided advice and funding to rebuild its status. As a result, in 1923, Meharry regained its rating as a "grade-A institution" by the American Medical Association (AMA).

Since its founding, Meharry Medical College has added several graduate programs in the areas of science, medicine, and public health. In 1938, the School of Graduate Studies and Research was founded. The first master's degree program, a Master of Science in Public Health, was established in 1947. In the 1950s, the nursing school and dental technology school were ended. The department of Psychiatry was established in 1961 by school president, Lloyd Charles Elam, a psychiatrist. During the 1960s, Meharry began to focus on understanding the basis of health outcome differences to improve health care. In 1968, Meharry created the Matthew Walker Health Center to provide health services to the community. Also in 1968, the school added a Ph.D. degree in basic sciences.

By the late 1960s and early 1970s, 83 percent of all African American physicians had been trained at Meharry Medical College and Howard University School of Medicine. In 1970, more than 60 percent of black medical students worked as residents at these two colleges. In 1972, Meharry started receiving federal distress grants which were given to medical schools with deficits in operating costs and problems with accreditation. By 1976, the school campus took up space on 65 acres.

In 1981, the accrediting body of the AMA put Meharry on probation because there were not enough patients in the Hubbard Hospital for students and the student to teacher ratio was too high. In 1983, president Ronald Reagan allowed the school to work with patients in the nearby veterans' hospitals and the Blanchfield Army Community Hospital and the college regained full accreditation. By 1986, around 46 percent of all black faculty members in medical schools had graduated from Meharry.

In 1972, a Ph.D. program was implemented. A decade later in 1982, Meharry established an M.D/Ph.D. program. In 2004, Meharry created a Master's of Science in Clinical Investigation program (2004).

The Hubbard Hospital, belonging to Meharry Medical College, closed in 1994 and was renovated as the new site for the Metropolitan Nashville General Hospital, opening in November 1997. The year 1994 was also a start for more renovations of campus buildings initiated by campus president, John E. Maupin Jr. The school was also suffering from a $49 million deficit and morale at the school was low. The Nashville General Hospital's lease money, however, helped bring money into the school and eventually, by June 1995, the finances of the school were stabilized. In 1999, the college formed an alliance with the Vanderbilt University Medical Center.

In 2005, Meharry was censured by the American Association of University Professors for not observing generally recognized principles of academic freedom and tenure.

On November 9, 2017, Meharry, under president James E.K. Hildreth, signed a memorandum of agreement with Hospital Corporation of America (HCA), America's largest for-profit operator of health care facilities. Under the agreement, Meharry's medical students will gain clinical training at HCA's TriStar Southern Hills Medical Center in Nashville. Meharry students had previously received clinical training at numerous sites, primarily Nashville General Hospital, which had moved on-campus in the 1990s. Withdrawal of the alliance with Meharry threatened the provision of inpatient care at Nashville General Hospital. A board member resigned over this surprise decision and announcement.

In April 2019, then-dean and senior vice president of health affairs Veronica Mallett secured a partnership with Detroit Medical Center to increase the number of Meharry students complete their studies at that hospital. Meharry students had been accepted at Sinai-Grace Hospital alongside Michigan State and Wayne State university since July 2018.

In September 2020, philanthropist Michael Bloomberg donated $34 million to help lower student debt at the institution. Bloomberg's gift was the largest in Meharry's history.

In 2021, Meharry launched Meharry Medical College Ventures to aid in galvanizing healthcare breakthroughs and solutions to improve health outcomes and reduce health disparities through forming partnerships with medical facilities across the US. Veronica Mallett was the inaugural president and CEO, serving until 2023. She was succeeded by Reginald Holt.

In March 2022, MacKenzie Scott donated $20 million to Meharry. Scott's unrestricted gift is one of the largest in Meharry's history. In 2024, Meharry received a $175 million gift from Bloomberg Philanthropies to support the school's endowment.

== Presidents ==
George W. Hubbard served as Meharry Medical College's first president from its founding in 1876 until his retirement in 1921.

The second president of the school was John J. Mullowney, who served from 1921 to 1938. He implemented changes in order to improve Meharry's overall academic rating. Admission requirements were tightened and strictly enforced, a superintendent was installed at the hospital, and the number of faculty, research facilities, and hospital facilities were all expanded. As a result, in 1923, Meharry regained its rating as a "grade-A institution" by the American Medical Association (AMA).

Succeeding Meharry Medical College presidents include:

- Edward Lewis Turner (1938–1944)
- M. Don Clawson (1944–1950)
- (From 1950 to 1952 a committee guided the institution instead of a president.)
- Harold D. West (1952–1966)
  - West was the school's first African-American president. He made numerous changes, made possible by his successful $20 million fund drive. He added a new wing to Hubbard Hospital, eliminated the nursing and the dental technology programs to concentrate Meharry Medical College's efforts on its primary strengths in medicine and dentistry, and purchased land adjacent to the campus for expansion.
- Lloyd C. Elam (1968–1981)
- Richard G. Lester (1981–1982)
- David Satcher (1982–1993)
- John E. Maupin (1994–2006)
- Wayne J. Riley (2006–2013)
- Anna Epps (2013–2015)
- James E. K. Hildreth (2015–present)

== Research and innovation ==
Meharry Medical College has historically focused on advancing biomedical knowledge and improving health outcomes, particularly for underserved populations.

In 1893, Meharry’s first female medical graduate, Georgianna Esther Patton, conducted early epidemiological studies in Liberia, identifying anemia and dropsy as prevalent health issues among the indigenous Kru people of Monrovia. In 1910, physician and chair of pathology, Arthur Melvin Townsend identified pellagra as a nutritional deficiency disorder, publishing his research findings in The Journal of the National Medical Association.

Since the early 1970s, Meharry has been active in molecular and genetics research. Geneticists Joseph Galley and Thomas Shockley led pioneering research on keloid scarring, a condition disproportionately affecting people of African descent. In 1972, Meharry established the Sickle Cell Center, one of the first ten such centers in the United States, offering diagnostic and healthcare services across 40 counties in Middle Tennessee for newborns with inherited blood disorders.

In 2015, physician and HIV researcher, James EK Hildreth was appointed president and shifted Meharry’s research focus toward precision and personalized medicine, integrating genomics, proteomics, molecular imaging, bioinformatics, artificial intelligence, and big data analytics.

Meharry Medical College research initiatives to address unmet healthcare needs include:

- NIH AIM-AHEAD Southeast Hub, advancing artificial intelligence and machine learning capabilities to transform health outcomes
- Center for Genome Research, funded by the National Human Genome Research Institute
- NSF Innovation-Corps Mid-South Hub, promoting biomedical entrepreneurship
- Chan Zuckerberg Initiative Partnership to Accelerate Precision Health research at HBCUs
- Dry January USA, a public health initiative promoting a healthier and balanced approach to alcohol consumption in rural and urban populations
- Beacon of Hope program, funded by Novartis, Sanofi and others to enhance clinical and translational research
- Equitable Breakthroughs in Medicine Development (EQBMED), funded by the Pharmaceutical Research and Manufacturers of America, to diversify clinical trials
- The Diaspora Human Genomics Institute (DHGI), a non-profit chartered by Meharry Medical College, to improve the quality of the human condition and its environment with a particular focus on persons of African ancestry
- Together for CHANGE (T4C), a biopharma-funded initiative governed by DHGI to build a reference genome database for African ancestry populations and new STEM pathways
- Meharry DNA Learning Center, in collaboration with Cold Spring Harbor Laboratory, exposing K-12 grade students and educators to DNA biology

Meharry Medical College has formed strategic research and academic partnerships with research institutions, including: the University of Memphis, Icahn School of Medicine at Mount Sinai, the University of Zambia, Kaohsiung Medical University of Taiwan, and Sefako Makgatho Health Sciences University of South Africa.

== BS/MD Program ==
Twelve universities are in partnership with Meharry to recruit and prepare their pre-med students for the academics of Meharry. The ten universities are Alabama A&M University, Albany State University, Alcorn State University, Fisk University, Grambling State University, Hampton University, Jackson State University, Southern University, Tennessee State University, and Virginia Union University. Beginning Summer 2024, Tuskegee University joined the BS/MD partnership.

== Notable alumni ==
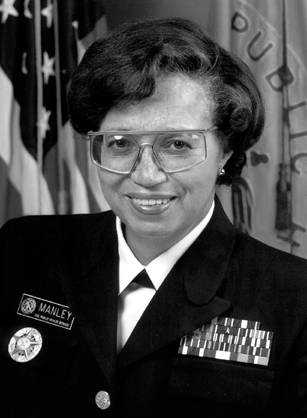
Dr. Audrey Manley, deputy surgeon general of the United States, 1995–1997

Dr. Corey Hébert

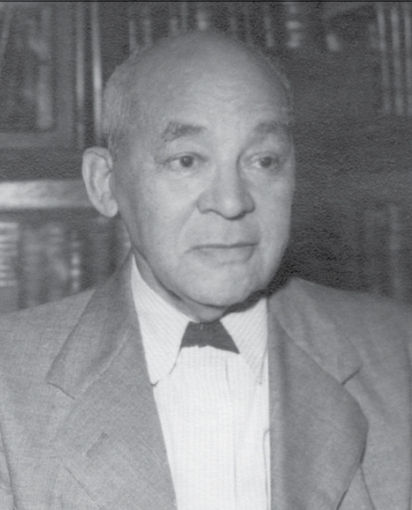
Dr. Lloyd Tevis Miller

Name	Class year	Notability
Lucinda Bragg Adams	1907	Prior to her medical degree, a noted composer, writer, and editor
Hastings Kamuzu Banda	1937	President of the Republic of Malawi
Carl C. Bell	1971	Professor of psychiatry
Clive O. Callender		Transplant surgeon, chairman of department, Howard University College of Medicine and founder of Minority Organ Tissue Transplant Education Program (MOTTEP)
Tameka A. Clemons	2003	Biochemist and professor at Meharry
Donna P. Davis	1975	First African-American woman doctor to enter the United States Navy
Lillian Singleton Dove	1917	Early Chicago physician and surgeon
Jacob J. Durham	1882	Founder of Morris College
Winston C. Hackett		First African American physician in Arizona
John Henry Hale	1905	Prominent surgeon credited with 30,000 operations; member of Meharry faculty for 29 years
Robert Walter Johnson		Tennis instructor for Althea Gibson and Arthur Ashe, physician and educator
Robert Lee	1944	South Carolina-born dentist who emigrated to Ghana in 1956 and operated a dental practice there for nearly five decades until his retirement in 2002
Monroe Alpheus Majors	1886	Physician and writer and civil rights activist in Texas and Los Angeles, California
Eleanor L. Makel	1943	Supervising medical officer, St. Elizabeths Hospital
Audrey F. Manley	1959	Surgeon general of the United States, president of Spelman College
Lloyd Tevis Miller	1893	Medical director of the Afro-American Sons and Daughters Hospital in Yazoo City, Mississippi (1928–1950)
Conrad Murray		Personal physician of Michael Jackson, convicted of involuntary manslaughter in Jackson's death on June 25, 2009
James Maxie Ponder		First African American physician in St. Petersburg, Florida
Theresa Greene Reed	1949	First African-American woman epidemiologist
Charles Victor Roman	1899	Founder and head of the Department of Ophthalmology and Otolaryngology at Meharry Medical College
Frank S. Royal	1968	Chair of Meharry Medical college's board; director of public companies; former president of the National Medical Association
C. O. Simpkins Sr.		Dentist and civil rights leader in Shreveport; member of the Louisiana House of Representatives 1992–1996
Walter R. Tucker Jr.		Former mayor of Compton, California
Matthew Walker Sr.	1934	Former professor and chairman of the Department of Surgery, Meharry
Georgia E. L. Patton Washington	1893	First African American woman licensed to practice medicine in Tennessee
Josie English Wells	1904	First woman to join Meharry's faculty and to open a private practice in Nashville
Emma Rochelle Wheeler	1905	Founder of Walden Hospital and school of nursing, both serving African Americans, in Chattanooga
Charles H. Wright	1943	Founder of the Charles H. Wright Museum of African American History
Joyce Yerwood	1933	First female African American physician in Fairfield County, Connecticut; founded the Yerwood Center, an African American community center in Stamford, Connecticut
Huda Zoghbi	1979	Known for research in Rett syndrome and spinocerebellar ataxia type 1

== See also ==
- African American student access to medical schools
