= One Riot, One Ranger =

Bronze statue of a Texas Ranger

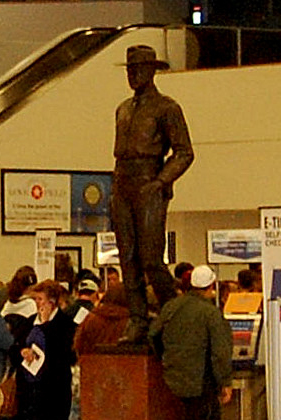
- Artist: Waldine Tauch
- Year: 1961
- Medium: Bronze sculpture
- Subject: Texas Ranger Jay Banks
- Dimensions: 3.7 m (12 ft)
- Location: Arlington, Texas, U.S.

The Texas Ranger of 1960 statue (commonly called the One Riot, One Ranger statue and previously the Jay Banks statue) is a bronze statue of a Texas Ranger, installed from 1961 to 2020 at Dallas Love Field. The common name for the statue comes from its inscription which refers to an unofficial Ranger slogan, based on an apocryphal story of Ranger William Jesse McDonald breaking up an illegal boxing match by himself in 1896.

While the sculpture was commissioned as a generic, unnamed Texas Ranger, sculptor Waldine Tauch used former Ranger E. J. Banks as her model. Banks was best known at the time for leading the contingent of Rangers sent by Texas Governor Allan Shivers to prevent desegregation at the high school in Mansfield and the junior college in Texarkana. Throughout his life both Banks and Tauch repeatedly confirmed that Banks was the model for the statue. Banks's support for the anti-integration protestors and refusal to allow black students to attend have made the statue controversial.

The statue was displayed in the lobby of Dallas Love Field from 1961 to 1974. After Love Field traffic dwindled due to the opening of Dallas Fort Worth International Airport, the statue was moved to Dallas Union Station amidst an effort to modernize the depot. It returned to the airport in 1984. Starting in 1992, some officials and community members criticized the display based on the Texas Rangers' role in La Matanza and other violence against Tejanos. In 2019, Dallas City Council nearly replaced the statue with one of Adelfa Callejo, and planned to move the Ranger elsewhere in the airport.

Aviation officials removed the Ranger statue in June 2020, during nationwide George Floyd protests, due to an essay connecting the statue with Banks. In March 2026, the Texas Rangers baseball team displayed the statue at Globe Life Field in Arlington, Texas. The team has spoken with pride of its namesake and disputed that the statue represents Banks.

== Creation ==
The statue, officially the Texas Ranger of 1960 (also, at the time, The Texas Ranger of Today) statue, was chosen by the Dallas Historical Monument Commission in 1959, after submissions by three artists. It was part of an effort to add public art to the airport, with another sculpture by Charles Umlauf title The Spirit of Flight to be displayed at the entrance. The Ranger statue was funded by an anonymous $25,000 donation (equivalent to $276,100 in 2025) from Texas businessman and restaurateur Earle Wyatt and his wife Mildred. Waldine Tauch, a prominent sculptor based in San Antonio, earned the commission.

Tauch worked on the preliminary design in clay. Her statue model, Jay Banks, posed for her for two weeks in the late 1950s at her San Antonio studio, with the permission of Ranger chief Homer Garrison. Once she had final approval, Tauch worked on the final version for 8 months, finishing in November 1960. She used modeling clay, olive oil, and sulphur in the original model, with the armature being constructed out of both iron and wood. That stage of the project weighed approximately 500 pounds, before Tauch used gypsum plaster to create a model for the final casting process at the Modern Art Foundry.

The statue is posed with the right hand over the holster and the left hand out in a calming motion. Garrison conditioned the Rangers' support for the project on a depiction that did not have the statue's hand on his pistol. Rangers historian (and former spokesman) Mike Cox, wrote that Garrison "wanted the bronze to demonstrate a Ranger's willingness to let a criminal draw first."

The statue stands 12 feet (3.7 m) tall, including its 4-foot-tall pink granite base. It is made of solid bronze, weighing approximately 3 tons.

=== Basis for the statue ===
Waldine Tauch received the brief that she make it a composite, instead of modeling it on a single figure. Tauch instead modeled the statue on Jay Banks, who sat as a live model. Banks also let Tauch use his equipment, including his custom holsters, for the statue. She said in 1976 that the sculpture was often referred to as the "Jay Banks statue." In 1978, The Dallas Morning News published a full-page profile of Banks by Kent Biffle that prominently featured a picture of the statue and spoke of his connection to it. A limited-run 1982 authorized biography of Banks had the title Legend in Bronze, as reference to the statue. Upon his death in 1987, he was also eulogized as the statue's subject. In 1976, Banks spoke fondly of the experience:

I don't mind admitting I enjoy remembering the statue. It did me some good posing for it. Until I did, I always thought models were kind of sissy.

=== Inscription ===
Below its official name is the inscription "One Riot—One Ranger," which has become the statue's common name. The inscription invokes an unofficial motto of the Texas Rangers. In his 1909 biography, Albert Paine briefly relayed an anecdote of Ranger William Jesse McDonald breaking up an unspecified prize-fight in Dallas by himself. When the mayor asked why he had not brought reinforcements, Paine quotes McDonald as saying "Hell! Ain't I enough! There's only one prize-fight." In 1919, the San Antonio News relayed the story as McDonald being asked to quell an unspecified riot in El Paso. When officials asked where the other Rangers were, he responded "Hell, there ain't but one riot here is there?"

Although it has unclear origins, the phrase is commonly recollected as an 1896 coinage of McDonald, upon being sent to monitor an illegal boxing match between Bob Fitzsimmons and Peter Maher in Langtry. The boxing match had become a major controversy, with "Judge" Roy Bean serving as the fight promoter, despite the statewide ban on boxing. The fight proceeded instead across the Mexican border on a sandbar in the Rio Grande, with McDonald and other Rangers ensuring they did not cross into Texas. There are no extant records to support the connection between the fight and the phrase. Historians dispute its origins with McDonald and question whether any Ranger ever said the phrase organically, before it was informally adopted as a slogan.

== Jay Banks ==
Banks was well known in the Dallas region for his work as a Ranger. He was credited with being part of the cadre of police who killed bootlegger and alleged murderer Gene Paul Norris in an ambush in 1957. He also appeared on some national programs—including the Today Show and What's My Line?—with other Rangers in 1956 and 1957. But he was especially recognized for his work in enforcing the unlawful segregation of schools in Mansfield and Texarkana in summer 1956.

In August 1956, the Court of Appeals for the Fifth Circuit ruled, based on Brown v. Board of Education (1954), that Mansfield High School could not legally deny black students from attending Mansfield High School. Texas governor Allan Shivers, who was a segregationist, rejected the ruling and supported the white administrators, parents, and students who rallied against any integration and who threatened to maim or kill any black student who tried to register at Mansfield. Shivers sent two Rangers, led by Banks, to "arrest anyone, white or colored, whose actions are such as to represent a threat to the peace at Mansfield." Segregationists hung effigies with painted bullet-holes throughout Mansfield and Fort Worth area, often with messages such as "This Would Be A Horrible Way To Die" as well as "We Mean What We Say." Some were hung at the entrance to Mansfield High School and elsewhere on the grounds, where they remained throughout the crisis.

For the following Tuesday, Banks and the other Ranger were joined by four other uniformed officers. Banks was pictured on the front page of The Fort Worth Star-Telegram and The Houston Chronicle overseeing the hand-off of a telegram from Shivers that authorized the Mansfield school district to transfer any black students who successfully registered. Banks was pictured in Time magazine leaning against a tree while a black effigy hung over the schoolhouse door in the background. Despite the court order, Mansfield successfully prevented the registration of any black children until the Civil Rights Act of 1964 threatened its funding, forcing desegregation in 1965.

After the Mansfield crisis, Shivers sent Banks and three other Rangers to oversee the attempted desegregation of Texarkana Junior College. When two black teenagers—Jessalyn Gray and Steve Poston—tried to attend, they were met by a group of 300 anti-integration protestors. Banks sought out the president of the local White Citizens Council (WCC), who helped organize the opposition, and per his recollection, he "told him exactly what his group could do without crossing us. We got along fine. We were soon good friends."

The students personally asked Banks whether the Rangers could escort them into the school, but he refused. Banks repeatedly threatened journalists who tried to interview Gray and Poston with arrest, on the grounds that they were ostensibly out-of-town agitators. When Poston attempted to proceed to the entrance of the school, the white mob surrounded him and kicked him, in view of Banks and the Rangers. Afterwards, the WCC celebrated Banks and the Rangers with a chicken dinner for their role in preventing the desegregation of Texarkana.

Both Mansfield and Texarkana events were covered repeatedly by major national outlets, including Time and Life, throughout the month. He was promoted to captain two weeks after the Texarkana crisis. He was fired from the Ranger corps in March 1960. Ranger chief Homer Garrison Jr. originally allowed Banks to say that he resigned. But after Banks publicly said he had left over a policy dispute with Garrison, Garrison said in a press conference that Banks had refused repeated orders to investigate illegal gambling in Fort Worth. He was also later fired from his job as Big Spring police chief for refusing to cooperate with other law enforcement agencies investigating malfeasance in his department. Later in his life, Banks expressed sympathy for the anti-integration protestors, arguing that they were "salt of the earth citizens" who had been provoked into their strong reaction by agitators.

== Display in Dallas ==
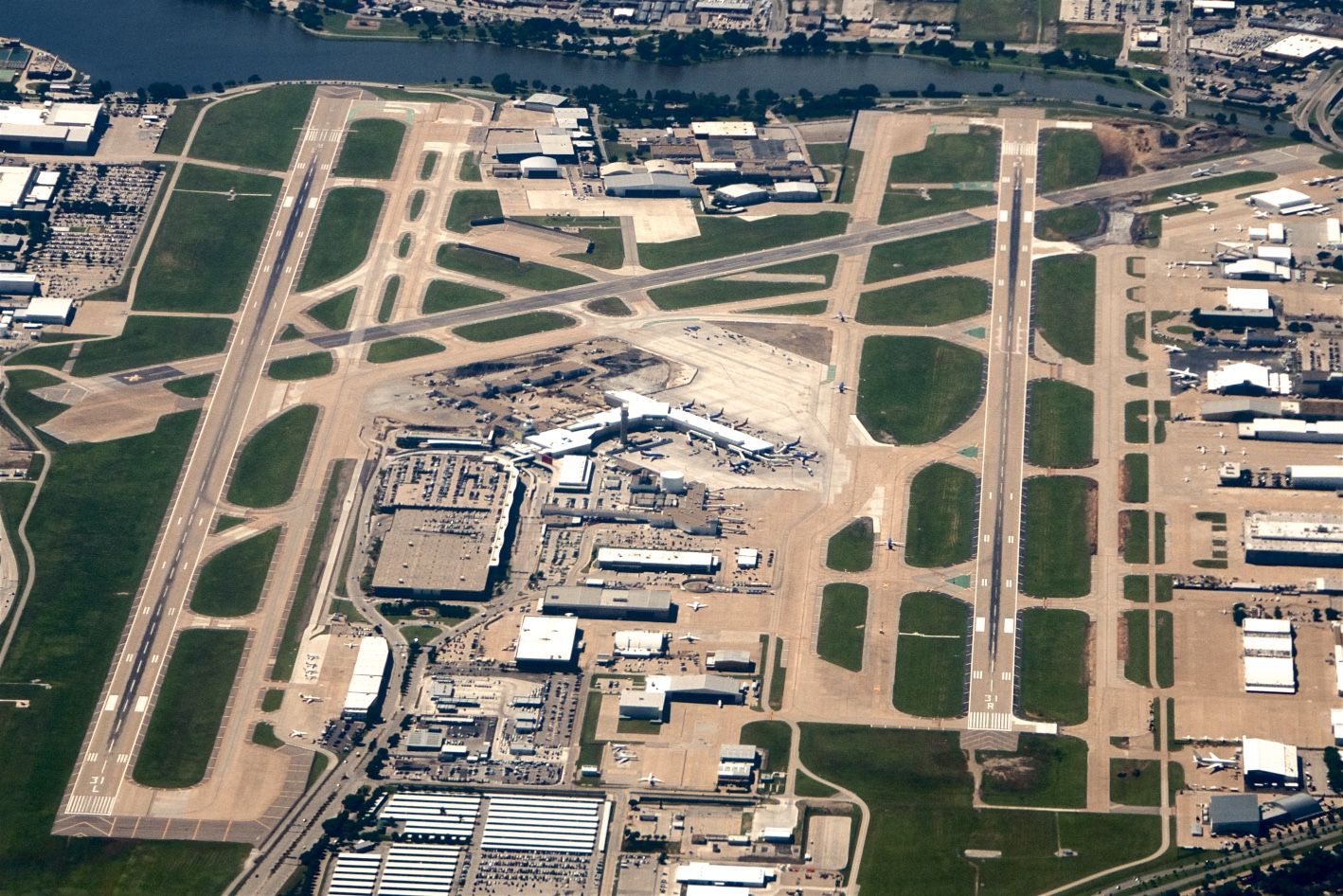
Dallas Love Field airport, pictured in 2013, where the statue was displayed for approximately 46 years, between 1961 and 2020

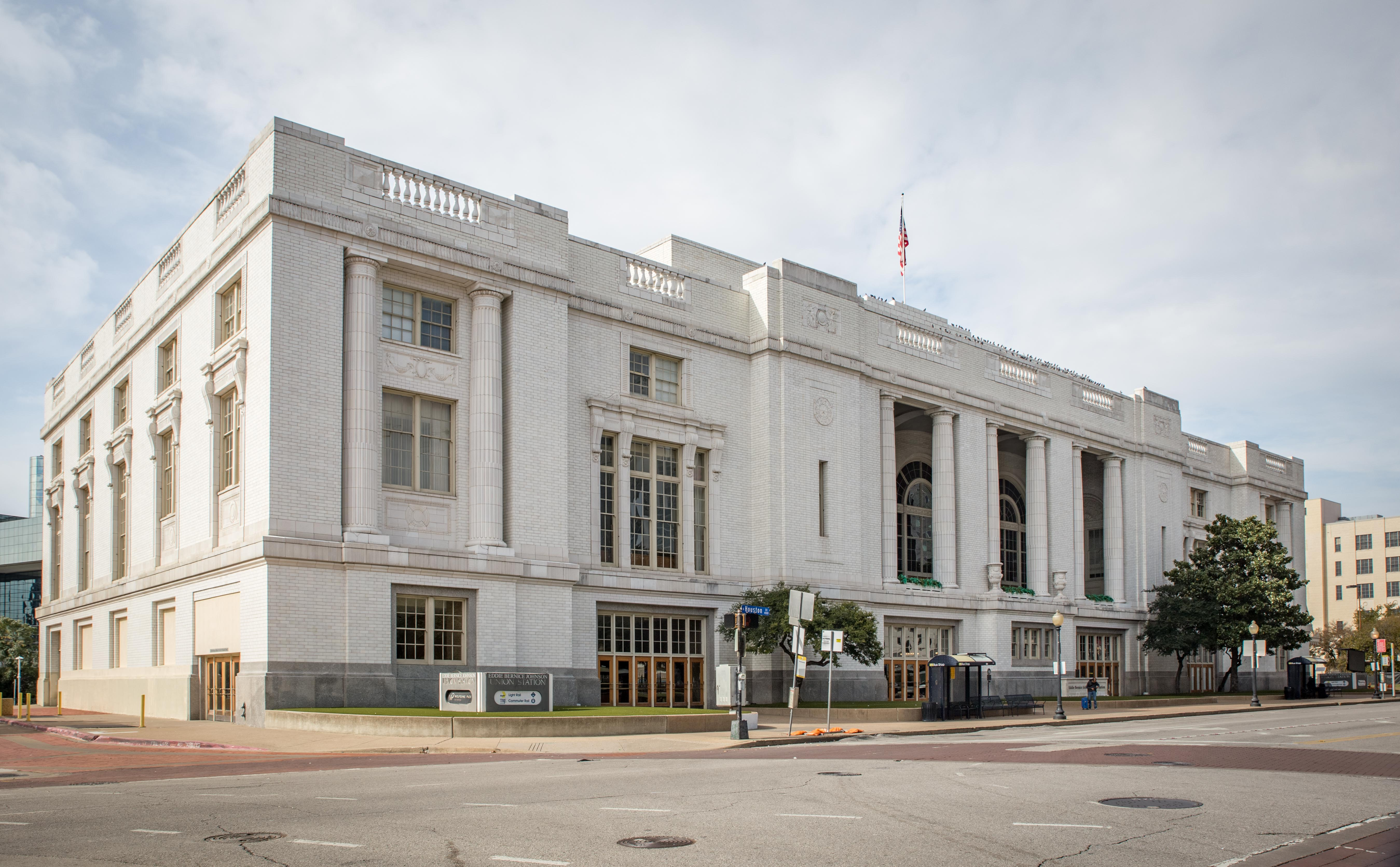
Dallas Union Station, pictured in 2022, where the statue was displayed between 1974 and 1984

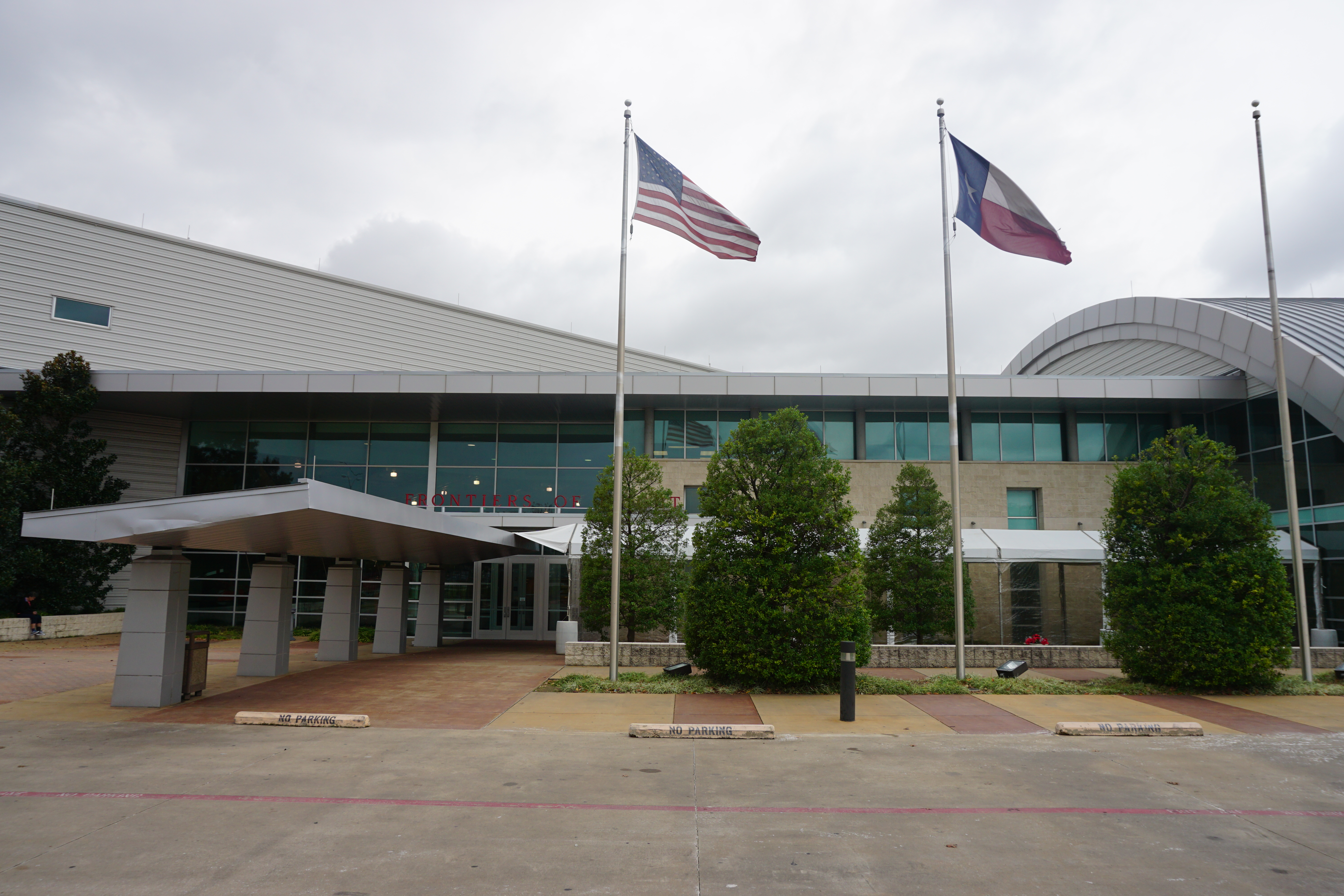
The Frontiers of Flight Museum at Dallas Love Field, pictured in 2015, where the statue was displayed between 2010 and 2013

The statue was installed at Dallas Love Field and dedicated on April 30, 1961. The unveiling was attended by 16 Rangers—including chief Homer Garrison—Dallas Mayor Robert Thornton, and Earle and Mildred Wyatt, who had come forward as the statue's funders. The statue served as a meeting spot for Tex Schramm and Lamar Hunt during their 1966 negotiations over the eventual AFL–NFL merger, though they opted to meet in Schramm's car to avoid publicity.

The statue was moved to the lobby of Dallas Union Station in 1974 amidst a shift in airport traffic from Love Field to Dallas Fort Worth International Airport. Despite a modernization effort, Union Station traffic dwindled and led Wyatt's wife to work with the city of Dallas to relocate the statue, starting in 1980. It eventually returned to Love Field with a re-dedication on October 16, 1984.

In 1992, Dallas council-member Domingo Garcia called for the statue's removal from Love Field. Garcia's family came from the Porvenir area and he spoke of the Porvenir massacre, where Rangers—with the U.S. Cavalry—randomly executed Mexican-American men and boys as collective punishment for the banditry of alleged Mexican revolutionaries. Porvenir existed within the ten-year La Matanza period, where Rangers and vigilantes indiscriminately killed thousands of people of Latin descent throughout South and West Texas. No other council-members supported Garcia's opposition to the statue, which resulted in no vote.

In October 2010, the statue was moved to the nearby Frontiers of Flight Museum to accommodate an airport modernization project. The statue was reinstalled in the renovated terminal lobby on March 12, 2013. After its re-dedication, city official Kay Kallos called it an iconic feature of the airport.

In 2019, the city council's committee on public art voted unanimously to replace the Ranger statue with one of Adelfa Callejo, a prominent civil rights lawyer in Dallas who was one of the first women—and the first woman of Latin descent—to practice law in Dallas county. The Callejo sculpture would have taken the Ranger statue's position in the lobby, with plans to move the Ranger to the baggage claim area. Two council-members did not agree with the move. Adam Medrano—council-member from the district that housed Love Field—tabled the motion to approve, effectively dismissing it. The Callejo statue was placed in Main Street Garden Park in 2021. At the time, the Ranger statue was referred to as a blight for the Mexican community, given the violent history of Rangers to Mexicans in southwest Texas.

=== Removal ===
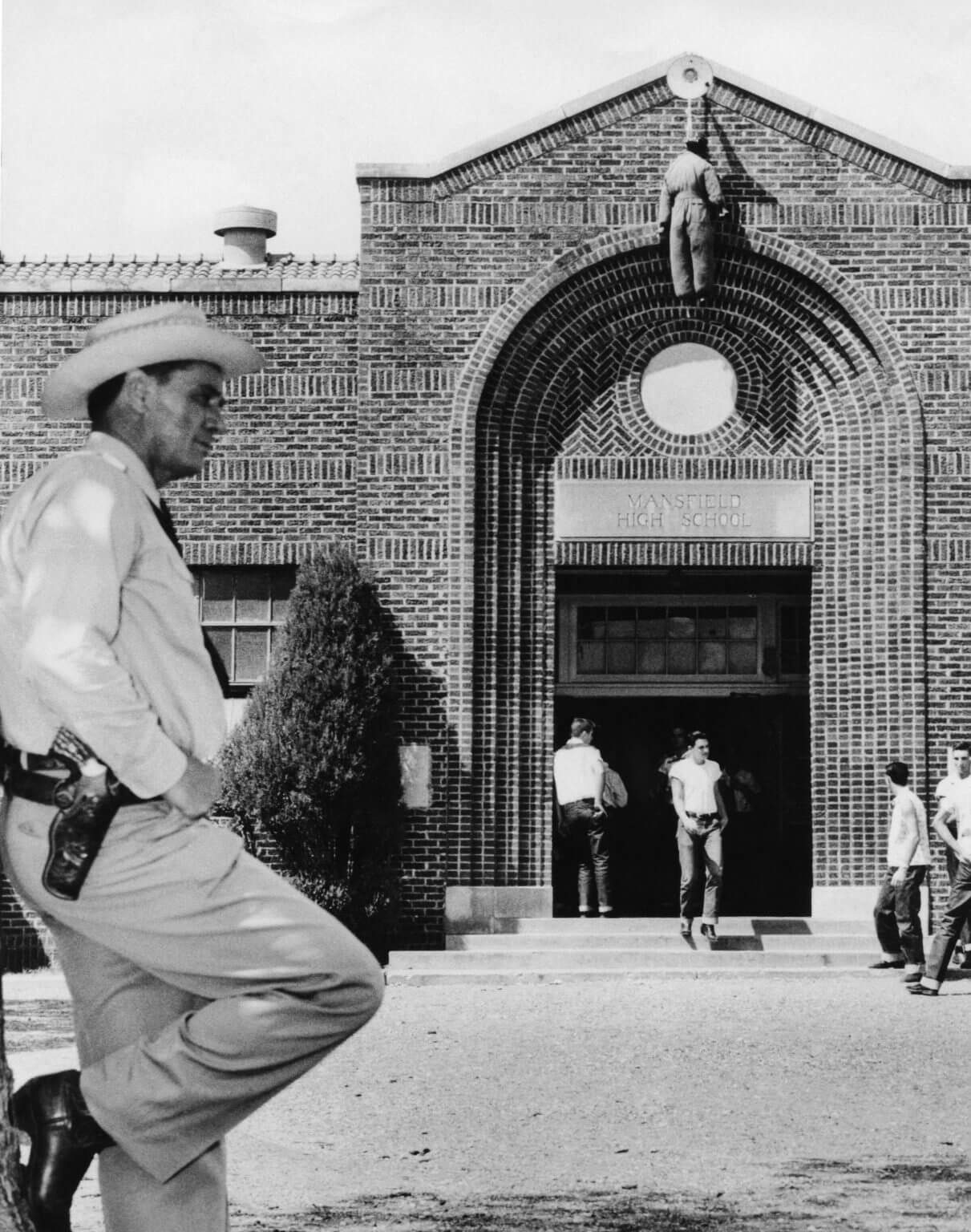
The controversial photograph of Jay Banks during the Mansfield Crisis in 1956 which contributed to the removal of the One Riot, One Ranger statue from Dallas Love Field

On June 3. 2020, D Magazine published an excerpt from a new history of the Rangers by journalist Doug Swanson. The chapter excerpted was primarily about the Rangers' failure to stop the Sherman Riot in 1930, but Swanson added more detail about the statue and Banks after D requested a better Dallas tie-in. After reading the magazine's print edition, airport officials discussed removing the statue due to the Banks connection, deciding to do so the next morning. Amidst the nationwide protests after the murder of George Floyd, there were concerns that the statue's controversy would attract protests at the airport. Per the city code, the aviation director of Love Field can make changes to prevent the disruption of airport operations without needing a public comment period or approval from city council. In a statement, officials pointed to the photo of Banks nonchalantly leaning against a tree while a black effigy hung over the school's entry.

The statue was stored by the city of Dallas, which also retained ownership. It was housed at a city-owned warehouse at the Hensley Field complex. When it was removed, the director of the city's Office of Arts and Culture and a spokesperson for Mayor Eric Johnson stated that its fate was under consideration. Johnson also said that neither he nor the city council had been consulted about the statue removal. In 2017, Dallas had also removed Robert E. Lee on Traveller and sold it via auction for $1.4 million. Multiple statues by Pompeo Coppini, who was Waldine Tauch's mentor and surrogate father, were removed from the campus of UT-Austin.

Immediately after removal, Swanson told the Dallas Morning News that he didn't intend to call for the statue to come down and that he was "not for silencing or abolishing pieces of history. I am for explaining them and giving them context." He also commented in a radio interview that Banks was only following the governor's orders in Mansfield and Texarkana. The Texas Department of Public Safety, which houses the Texas Ranger division, said in a statement that it would "remain committed to the mission of protecting and serving the community and people of Dallas."

Two weeks after the removal, Chicago Tribune columnist Steve Chapman wrote that—following Swanson's book and the statue controversy—the Texas Rangers baseball team should set aside the Ranger name. A Washington Post column by Karen Attiah argued the same in July, in the context of the Washington Redskins name controversy. The team said that it would not change its name and said it would recommit itself to the local community. In 2021, the team hosted Floyd Moody—who was one of the three black students not allowed to attend Mansfield High School in 1956—for the ceremonial first pitch.

The statue controversy and the George Floyd protests sparked general conversation about the Texas Rangers as a whole. Domingo Garcia, who headed the League of United Latin American Citizens, said that the statue removal was necessary, but fell short of his desire that the state disband the Texas Ranger division entirely. Jerry E. Patterson, a three-term former Texas Land Commissioner, argued that the discourse either demonized or deified the Rangers, dismissing talk of abolition or name change as "total bullshit." Historian Monica Muñoz Martinez, who received a MacArthur "genius" grant in 2021 for her work chronicling La Matanza and subsequent state violence against Tejanos, placed the Ranger statue in the history of Confederate statues used to intimidate black and Latin citizens during the Jim Crow era. Mark Duebner—the aviation director who chose to remove the statue—said in 2026 that he continued to receive angry phone calls from the statue's supporters for a year after the controversy.

== Display by baseball team ==
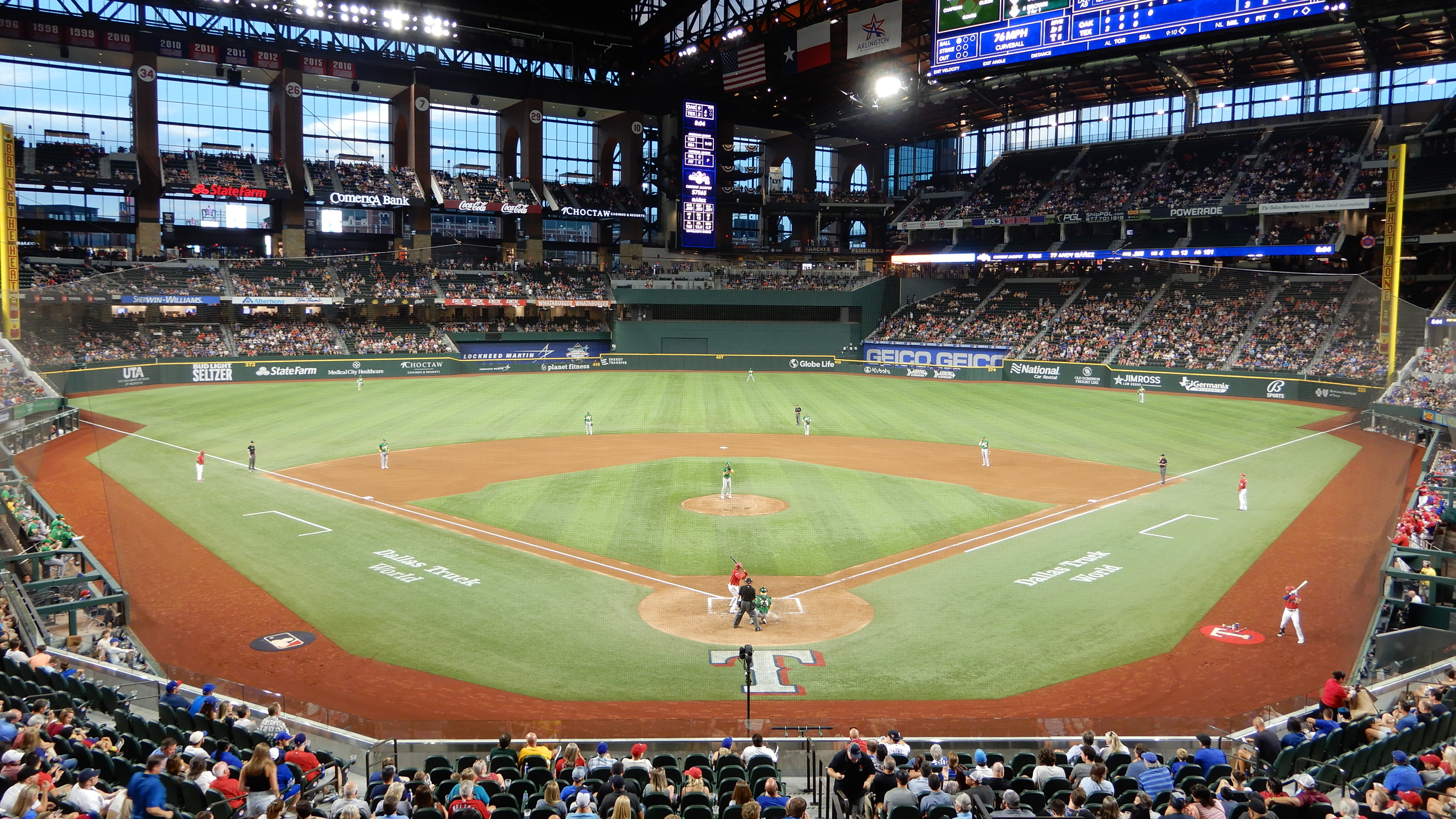
Globe Life Field, pictured in 2021, where the statue has been displayed since March 2026

In 2023, the Texas Ranger Association Foundation (TRAF)—a non-profit affiliated with the law enforcement agency—negotiated with the city to receive the statue on loan. The stated plan was for the statue to be displayed at a new area of the Texas Ranger Hall of Fame and Museum in Waco, Texas. After renovations prevented its display in Waco, TRAF board-member Russell Molina negotiated its placement at Globe Life Field in Arlington, Texas. Molina said that he had felt from the beginning that Globe Life was "the ideal place" for the statue. The move was first announced at a meeting of the city's public arts committee in February 2026.

On March 2, 2026, the statue was installed on the left field concourse at Globe Life by the Texas Rangers baseball team. The team's owner Ray Davis spoke of his support for and the team's pride in the law enforcement agency. Molina said at the unveiling that the modern Rangers division displays the "diversity, integrity and professionalism expected of one of the nation's oldest and most respected law enforcement organizations." The Ranger statue became the seventh statue installed by the team.

The team provided less than a day's notice to the media before the unveiling, referring to it as "a new permanent non-baseball addition to the left field concourse." After hearing of the plans via anonymous tip, the NAACP Arlington chapter went to the team to express their concerns. Following the statue's installation, the Arlington chapter said that they did not necessarily want the statue removed, but that they felt the connection to Jay Banks was in bad taste due to the proximity of the stadium to Mansfield. The NAACP Grand Prairie chapter president Angela Luckey said the change reflected a failure to work with the local black community, calling for the statue's removal.

Congressman Marc Veasey (D-District 33), whose district includes Globe Life, released a statement criticizing the installation at the ballpark. Veasey also wrote a letter to MLB Commissioner Rob Manfred and Rangers ownership, arguing that the move disrespected the legacy of Jackie Robinson and Larry Doby. Arlington Mayor Jim Ross worked with the concerned community groups in expressing to Rangers ownership the potential problems with the statue. Ross said that Davis thought that the move wouldn't be controversial, due to the tacit support of Dallas Mayor Eric Johnson, who is black. In a statement, Johnson's office expressed indifference to the move. Mansfield Mayor Michael Evans said that he wanted to meet with Rangers ownership, accompanied by Floyd Moody and other community members, to relay how he felt the connection between Banks, the statue, and the desegregation fight at Mansfield merited the statue's removal.

At the team's home opener, some fans of the Rangers expressed support for the statue, strongly criticizing its original removal from Love Field. Doug Swanson, himself a longtime Rangers fan, said that he continued to not support the original removal from Love Field and preferred that the statue be placed in its proper context, but he questioned why the team would want the bad publicity. On Jackie Robinson Day, community groups, including the South Dalworth Historical Society and the Dallas Muslim Peace Society, protested outside the ballpark.

TRAF representative Russell Molina argued with critics that the statue doesn't represent Banks and instead is meant to represent all Rangers. He also defended Banks, saying that he did not think that one image—referring to the image of Banks leaning against a tree with a black effigy in the background—should define his character.

== See also ==
- Confederate War Memorial (Dallas) – another monument removed the same month
- List of monuments and memorials removed during the George Floyd protests
