= Charlye O. Farris =

American lawyer

Charlye Ola Farris
- Born: June 30, 1929; Wichita Falls, Texas
- Died: February 18, 2010 (aged 80); Wichita Falls
- Education: Prairie View A&M College; University of Denver; Howard University
- Occupations: Lawyer, judge

Charlye Ola Farris (1929-2010) was Texas’ first African American female lawyer.

She was born on June 30, 1929, in Wichita Falls, Texas, to educators James Randolph Farris, Sr. and Roberta Bell. Upon earning her political science degree from Prairie View A&M College in 1948, she worked briefly as an educator before pursuing a career in law. She received her legal education firstly from the University of Denver and secondly at the Howard University in Washington D.C. She graduated with a law degree from the latter institution in 1953. Farris was the first African American female admitted to practice law in Texas the same year. Thereafter, she became the first female lawyer in her hometown of Wichita Falls. She also became the first African American female to serve as the Special Wichita County Judge in 1954. In 1973, she served in a judicial capacity yet again as the acting District Judge of the 78th District Court in Wichita County.

Farris died on February 18, 2010 in Wichita Falls. In 2011, the Texas Historical Commission erected a marker to celebrate Farris’ legacy. Scholarships have also been created throughout Texas in Farris’ honor. For instance, the Travis County Women’s Lawyer Association created a scholarship in the honor of both Farris and Edna Cisneros. Farris was a member of Alpha Kappa Alpha sorority.

Midwestern State University announced at the May 6, 2021, board meeting, the naming of the new Charlye O. Farris Social Justice Resource Center. Farris was a member of the MSU Texas Board of Regents from 2006 to 2010.

== See also ==
- List of African-American jurists
- List of first women lawyers and judges in Texas
