= Harriet Mitchell Murphy =

American judge (1927–2024)

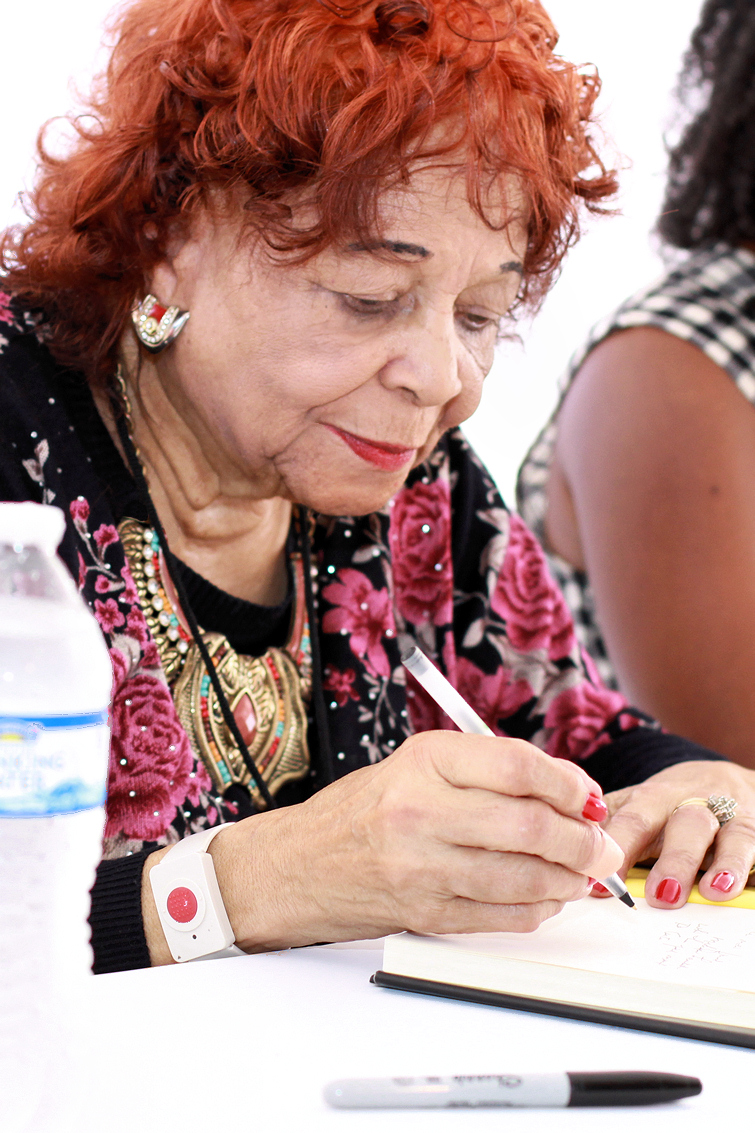
Murphy at the 2018 Texas Book Festival

Harriet Mitchell Murphy (June 6, 1927 – January 17, 2024) was the first African-American woman appointed to a regular judgeship in Texas.

== Life and career ==
Harriet Mitchell Murphy was born in Atlanta, Georgia, on June 6, 1927. She received her bachelor's degree from Spelman College, master's degree from Clark Atlanta University, and law degree from the University of Texas School of Law.

In 1973, she became the first African-American woman appointed to a regular judgeship in Texas, and served on the City of Austin Municipal Court for twenty years. Before joining the municipal court, she practiced law part-time for eight years and served as the head of the government department at Huston–Tillotson in Austin for five years.

Murphy died on January 17, 2024, at the age of 96.

== See also ==
- List of African-American jurists
- List of first women lawyers and judges in Texas
