= List of first women lawyers and judges in Texas =

This is a list of the first women lawyer(s) and judge(s) in Texas. It includes the year in which the women were admitted to practice law (in parentheses). Also included are women who achieved other distinctions such becoming the first in their state to graduate from law school or become a political figure.

== Firsts in state history ==
=== Law school ===
- Emeline Abood Jackson, JD '26: First female graduate of the Law School of Baylor University (1926).
- Gloria Bradford (1954): First African American woman to graduate from law school in Texas, earning her degree from the University of Texas School of Law in 1954
- Hattie Ruth Elam Briscoe: First African American woman to graduate from St. Mary's Law School in Texas (1956)

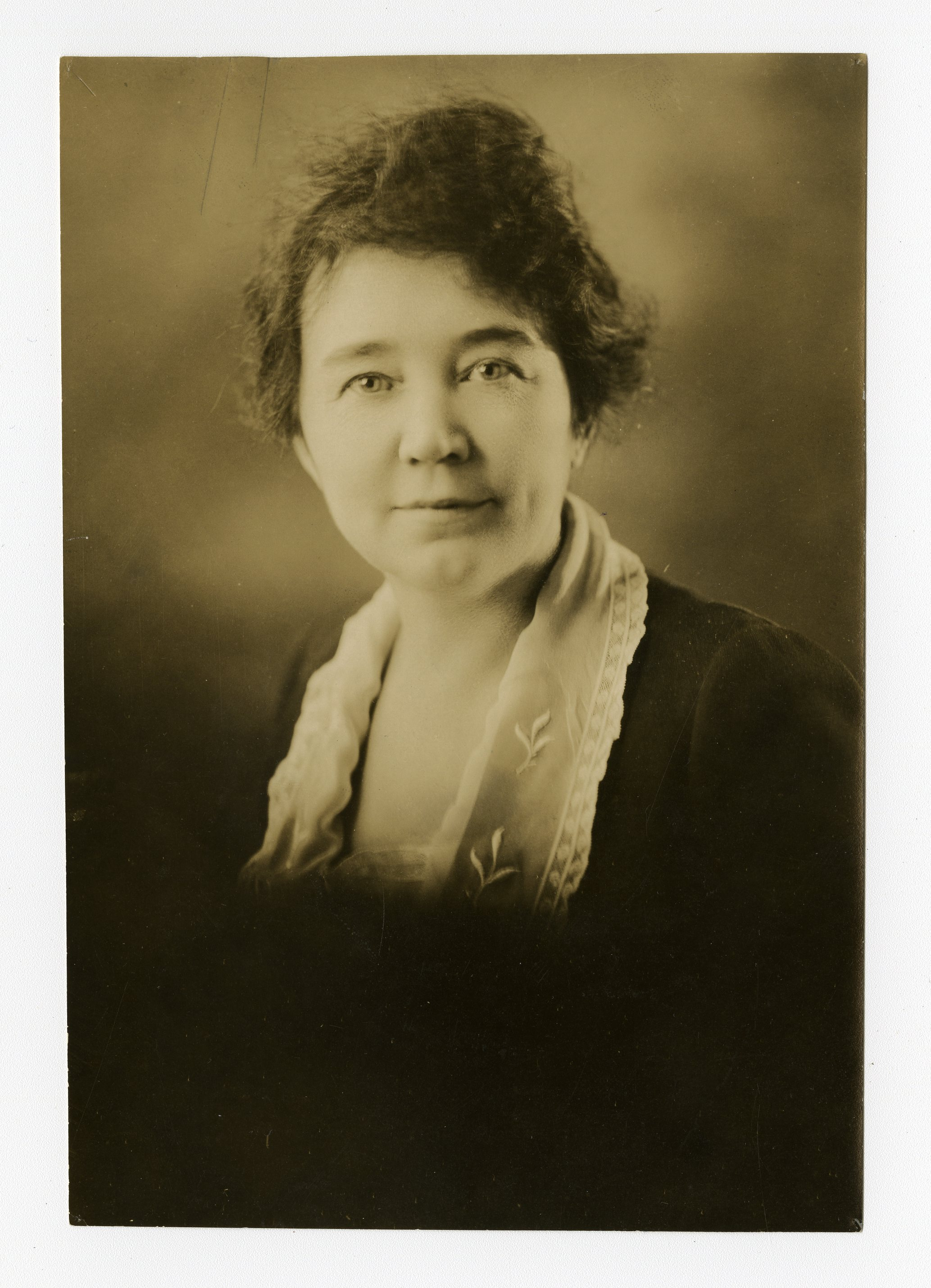
Hortense Sparks Ward: First female lawyer in Texas (1910)

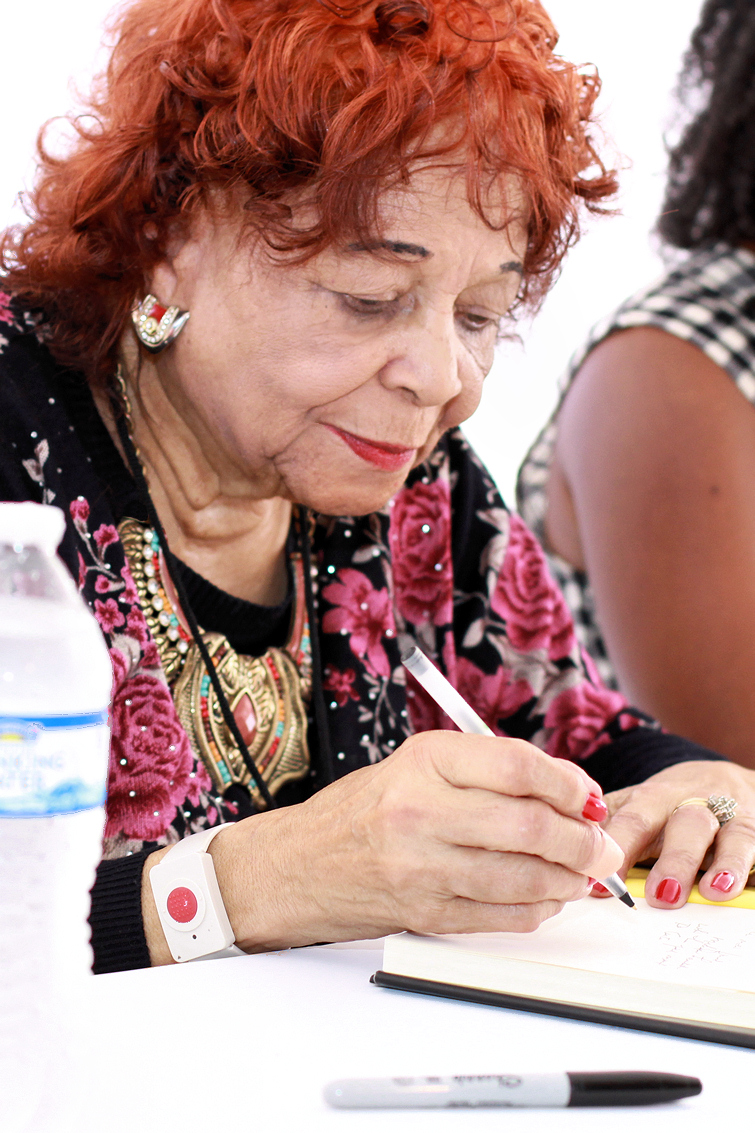
Harriet Mitchell Murphy: First African American female judge in Texas (1973)

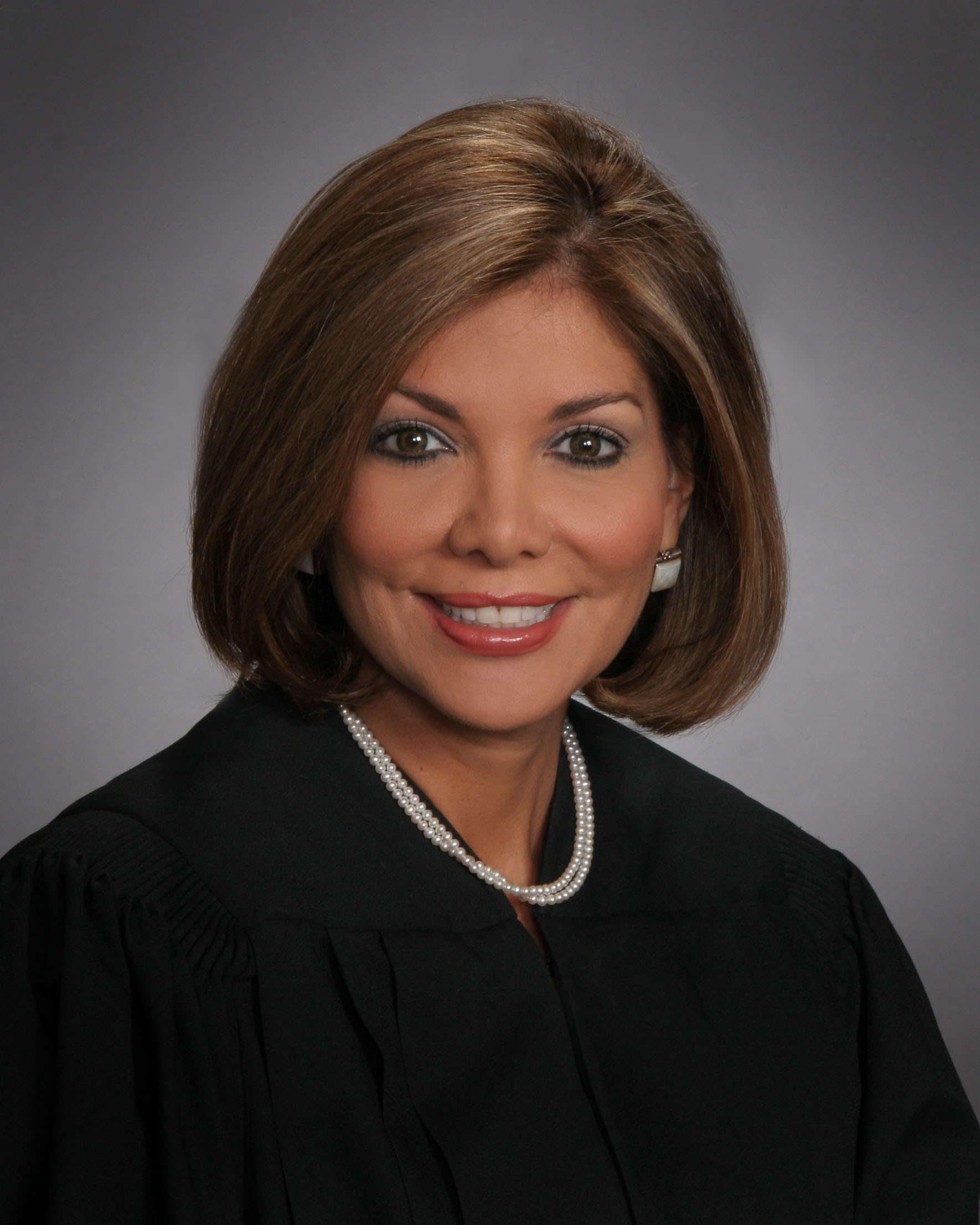
Eva Guzman: First Hispanic female justice of the Supreme Court of Texas (2009)

=== Lawyers ===
- Edith W. Locke (1902): First woman admitted to practice law in Texas, though she did not exercise the right
- Hortense Sparks Ward (1910): First female lawyer in Texas, as well as the first woman admitted to practice law before the U.S. Supreme Court (1915)
- Florence Bates (1914): One of the first female lawyers in Texas; left the profession and become a Hollywood actress later in life
- Beverly Tarpley (1952): First female lawyer in Texas to argue a case before the U.S. Supreme Court
- Charlye O. Farris (1953): First African American female lawyer in Texas
- Edna Cisneros (1955) and Diana Cisneros Klefisch (1956): First Hispanic American female lawyers in Texas

=== Judicial officers ===
==== State ====
===== Judges =====
- Sarah T. Hughes (1922): First female judge in Texas (1935)
- Charlye O. Farris (1953): First African American woman to serve as a judge pro tem in Texas (1954)
- Harriet Mitchell Murphy (1969): First African American female judge in Texas (1973)
- Wendy Duong: First Vietnamese American (female) judge in Texas (1992)
- Orlinda Naranjo: First Latino American woman elected to a countywide judgeship in Texas (1994)
- Barbara Hartle (1999): First openly LGBT female judge in Texas (2006)
- Phyllis Frye (1981): First openly LGBT judge in Texas (2010)
- Tonya Parker: First openly LGBT African American (female) elected to a judicial seat in Texas (2010)
- Rabeea Sultan Collier: First Muslim American and Pakistani American (female) judge in Texas (2019)
- Manpreet Monica Singh: First Sikh female judge in Texas (2023)

====== Business courts ======
- Sofia Adrogué: First (Latino American) female judge of the Texas Business Court (2024)

====== County courts ======
- Mary Velma Davenport: First female county judge in Texas (c. 1938)
- Charlye O. Farris (1953): First African American woman elected as a county judge pro tem in Texas (1954)
- Alicia R. Chacón: First Latino American woman elected as a judge of a major county in Texas (c. 1990s)

====== Municipal courts ======
- Barbara Hartle (1999): First openly LGBT woman to become a municipal court judge in Texas (2006)
- Phyllis Frye (1981): First openly LGBT individual appointed as a municipal court judge in Texas (2010)

===== District courts =====
- Sarah T. Hughes (1922): First woman appointed as a judge of a District Court in Texas (1935)
- Elma Salinas Ender (1978): First Latino American woman to serve as a state district court judge in Texas (1983)
- Mary Roman: First Latino American woman elected as a state district court judge in Texas (1992)
- Kristen Hawkins (2000): First woman elected as a judge of the 11th District Court in Texas (2017)
- Renee Rodriguez-Betancourt: First woman to become the youngest district court judge in Texas (2017)

===== Courts of appeals =====
- Shirley W. Butts (1954): First woman appointed as a justice on a Texas court of appeals, the Fourth Court of Appeals (1981)
- Camille Hutson–Dunn (1963): First woman to be directly elected as a justice on a Texas Court of Appeals, the First Court of Appeals (1984)
- Alice Oliver–Parrott (1975): First woman to serve as a chief justice on a Texas appellate court, the First Court of Appeals (1991–1996)
- Gaynelle Griffin Jones: First African American woman to serve as an appellate court judge in Texas (1992)
- Linda Reyna Yáñez: First woman to serve as a justice of the Thirteenth Court of Appeals in Texas (1993)
- Leanne Johnson: First woman elected to serve as a justice of the Ninth Circuit Court of Appeals for Texas (2014)
- Gisela Triana: First Latino American woman to serve as a judge of the Third District Court of Appeals (2018)
- Robbie Partida-Kipness: First Hispanic American (female) to serve as a judge of the Fifth Court of Appeals in Texas (2018)
- Dori Contreras: First female justice appointed as the chief justice of the Thirteenth Court of Appeals in Texas (2019)
- Frances Bourliot: First Asian American woman elected as an appellate court judge in Texas, the Fourteenth Court of Appeals (2020)
- Yvonne T. Rodriguez: First Latino American woman to serve as the chief justice of the Eighth Court of Appeals (2021)

===== Court of criminal appeals =====
- Sharon Keller (1978): First woman to serve as the presiding judge of the Court of Criminal Appeals of Texas (2000)
- Elsa Alcala: First Latino American woman to serve as a judge of the Court of Criminal Appeals of Texas (2011)

===== Supreme court =====
- Hattie L. Henenberg: First Jewish woman to serve on the Texas Supreme Court (upon her appointment to the "All-Woman" Texas Supreme Court in 1925)
- Margaret Harris Amsler (1937): First woman to serve as the Marshall of the Supreme Court of Texas (1941)
- Ruby Kless Sondock (1961): First woman appointed as a justice of the Supreme Court of Texas (1982)
- Rose Spector: First woman (who was also Jewish) elected as a justice of the Supreme Court of Texas (1992)
- Eva Guzman: First Hispanic woman appointed as a justice of the Supreme Court of Texas (2009)
- Maggie Ellis: First openly lesbian judge to become the Chief Justice-elect of the Texas Supreme Court (2027)

==== Federal ====
===== District court =====
- Sarah T. Hughes (1922): First woman appointed as a judge of the Federal District Court (1961) in Texas
- Barbara M.G. Lynn (1976): First woman to become the Chief Judge of the U.S. District Court for the Northern District of Texas (2016)
- Gabrielle Kirk McDonald: First African American woman and first woman appointed as a judge of the Southern District of Texas (1979)
- Hilda G. Tagle: First Hispanic American woman to serve as an appellate judge in Texas
- Janis Graham Jack: First woman to serve as a U.S. District judge for the Southern District of Texas (1994)
- Alia Moses (1986): First woman to serve as a judge of the U.S. States District Court for the Western District of Texas (2002) and its chief judge (2022)
- Brenda T. Rhoades: First Asian American (female) to serve as a judge of the U.S. Bankruptcy Court for the Eastern District of Texas (2003)
- Judith K. Guthrie: First woman appointed as a magistrate judge of the U.S. States District Court for the Eastern District of Texas
- Karen Gren Scholer: First Asian American (female) U.S. district court judge in Texas (2018)
- Ada E. Brown: First African American and Native American woman to serve as a judge of the United States District Court for the Northern District of Texas (2019)
- Yvonne Ho: First Asian American (female) to serve as a judge of the United States District Court for the Southern District of Texas (2023)

===== Court of appeals =====
- Carolyn Dineen King: First woman to serve as the chief judge of the United States Court of Appeals for the Fifth Circuit (1999)

=== Deputy attorney general ===
- Elizabeth B. Lacy: First woman to serve as the deputy attorney general for Texas (1973)

=== Assistant attorney general ===
- Ethel F. Hilton: First woman to serve as the assistant attorney general for Texas (1927–1931)

=== District attorney ===
- Edna Cisneros (1955): First Hispanic American woman to become a district attorney in Texas
- Erleigh Norville Wiley: First African American woman to become a district attorney in Texas (2014)

=== Assistant district attorney ===
- Sarah Menezes: First woman to serve as the assistant district attorney in Texas

=== United States attorney ===
- Gaynelle Griffin Jones: First woman (and African American woman) to serve as a U.S. attorney for Texas (1993–1997)
- Sarah Saldaña: First Latino American woman to serve as the U.S. attorney for the Northern District of Texas (2011)

=== County attorney ===
- Nellie Gray Robertson: First woman to serve as a county attorney in Texas (1918)
- Bridgette Smith-Lawson: First African American woman to serve as a county attorney in Texas (2020)

=== Political office ===
- Barbara Jordan (1959): First African American female lawyer elected to the Texas Senate (1966)
- Irma L. Rangel (1969): First Hispanic American woman elected to the Texas State Legislature (1976)
- Sylvia Garcia (1978) and Veronica Escobar: First Hispanic American women (both former judges) elected to Congress in Texas (2018)
- Nandita Berry (1995): First Indian American woman (and Indian American in general; a lawyer) to serve as the secretary of state for Texas (c. 2014)
- Jolanda Jones (1995): First openly lesbian African American (a lawyer) elected to the Texas State Legislature (upon winning a special election in House District 147 in 2022)

=== Bar association ===
- Harriet Miers (1970): First woman to serve as president of the State Bar of Texas (1992)
- Lisa Tatum: First African American woman (and African American in general) to serve as president of the State Bar of Texas (2013–2014)
- Sylvia Borunda Firth: First Hispanic American woman to serve as president of the State Bar of Texas (2020)

== Firsts in local history ==
Alphabetized by county name

=== Regions ===
- Leticia Hinojosa: First female judge in the Rio Grande Valley (1996)
- Deborah Oakes Evans: First woman to serve as a judge of the 87th Judicial District (2002); Anderson, Freestone, Leon and Limestone counties
- Rachel Littlejohn: First female district court judge in South Texas (1974); Aransas, Bee, Live Oak, McMullen and San Patricio counties
- Trisha Coleman Byars: First woman to serve as a judge of the 97th Judicial District (2023); Archer, Clay, and Montague counties
- Audrey Gossett-Louis: First woman to serve as the district attorney for the 81st Judicial District; Atascosa, Frio, Karnes, LaSalle, and Wilson counties
- Erum Jivani-Gillani: First Asian American woman to serve as a judge of the Pearland Municipal Court (2018); Brazoria, Fort Bend and Harris counties
- Barbara Walther: First woman elected as a judge of the 51st District Court (1992); Coke, Irion, Schleicher, Sterling and Tom Green counties
- Angela Saucier: First woman to serve as a judge of the 76th Judicial District (2019); Camp, Morris and Titus counties
- Hortense Sparks Ward (1910): First female lawyer in Houston, Texas; Fort Bend, Harris and Montgomery counties
- Lois L. Woods: First African American female graduate from the Texas Southern University Thurgood Marshall School of Law (1951); Fort Bend, Harris, and Montgomery counties
- Lynne Liberato: First woman to serve as president of the Houston Bar Association (1993); Fort Bend County, Harris County and Montgomery counties
- Kristen Brauchle Hawkins: First woman appointed as a judge of the Eleventh District Court in Houston (2019); Fort Bend, Harris and Montgomery counties
- Irene Gertrude Brown (1911) and Rose Zelosky: First women to graduate from the University of Texas law school (1914); Hays, Travis and Williamson counties
- Sydney B. Hewlett: First woman to serve as a judge of the 18th Judicial District Court (2019); Johnson and Somervell counties
- Beverly Tarpley (1952): First woman to serve as president of the Abilene Bar Association; Jones and Taylor counties
- Ginger D. Fagan: First female county judge elected in South Texas (upon becoming a judge in Refugio County in 1978)

=== Anderson County ===
- Allyson Mitchell: First female district attorney for Anderson County (2015)

=== Andrews County ===
- Jeneane Anderegg: First woman to serve as commissioner of the Commissioners' Court of Andrews County (2014)

=== Aransas County ===
- Lola L. Bonner: First woman to serve as president of the Aransas County Bar Association

=== Austin County ===
- Carolyn Bilski: First woman to serve as the county judge of Austin County

=== Bailey County ===
- Marilyn Cox: First woman elected as county judge in ailey County

=== Bastrop County ===
- Emma Webb (1923): First female lawyer in Bastrop County

=== Bee County ===
- Stephanie Moreno: First female county judge in Bee County

=== Bell County ===
- Martha Trudo: First female judge in Bell County
- Claudia Brown: First African American woman to serve as the justice of the peace in Bell County (2016)
- Ebony Todd: First African American woman to serve as a municipal court judge in Nolanville (2020); Bell County

=== Bexar County ===
- Irene Gertrude Brown (1911): First female lawyer in San Antonio; Bexar County
- Lanette Heilbron Glasscock (1931): One of the first practicing female lawyers in Bexar County
- Mary Agnes Aird: First female law graduate of St. Mary's University (1936); Bexar County
- Elizabeth Carrie Jandt: First female law graduate of St. Mary's University who was the daughter of an alumnus; Bexar County
- Hattie Ruth Elam Briscoe: First African American female lawyer in Bexar County (c. 1956)
- Carol Haberman Knight-Sheen: First female district court judge in Bexar County
- Janice S. McCoy: First woman to serve as a judge of the San Antonio Municipal Court (1977); Bexar County
- Sparta Christ Bitsis: First female lawyer to work for San Antonio's Corporation Court
- Mary Roman: First Latino American woman elected as a state district court judge in Bexar County (1992)
- Susan Reed: First woman to serve as the district attorney for Bexar County (1998)
- Jane Macon: First woman to serve as the city attorney for San Antonio (1977–1983); Bexar County
- Antonia "Toni" Arteaga: First woman elected as a judge of the 57th District Court (2008); Bexar County
- Rosie Speedlin Gonzalez: First openly LGBT (female) judge in Bexar County (2019)
- Kimberly Burley: First woman and African American to preside in the Bexar County Children's Court (2021)

=== Bosque County ===
- Regina Hanson: First woman to serve as the Bosque County judge (1985)

=== Bowie County ===
- Kelley Crisp: First woman to serve as the assistant district attorney for Bowie County (2019)

=== Brazoria County ===
- Jerri Lee Mills: First female judge in Brazoria County (1995)

=== Brazos County ===
- Carolyn Ruffino: First female judge of a court of record in Brazos County (1982)

=== Brewster County ===
- Val Beard: First female county judge in Brewster County

=== Brooks County ===
- Imelda Barrera: First female county judge in Brooks County

=== Burnet County ===
- Ophelia "Birdie" Harwood: First female judge in Marble Falls (1936); Burnet County
- Donna Klaeger: First female judge in Burnet County

=== Caldwell County ===
- Rebecca Hawener: First female county judge in Caldwell County

=== Cameron County ===
- Migdalia Lopez: First woman elected as a county court at law judge in Cameron County; first woman to serve as a district court judge in Cameron and Willacy counties
- Elia Cornejo Lopez: First woman appointed as a municipal court judge in Brownsville (2008), Cameron County, Texas
- Roxann Pais Cotroneo: First [Hispanic American] female to serve as the City Attorney of Harlingen, Cameron County, Texas (2009)

=== Camp County ===
- Angela Saucier: First woman to serve as a judge of the 76th Judicial District (2019); Camp, Morris and Titus counties

=== Cass County ===
- Courtney Shelton: First female district attorney for Cass County (2018)
- Becky Wilbanks: First female judge in Cass County (2021)

=== Chambers County ===
- Alma Lois Turner: First female county judge in Chambers County (1978–1986)

=== Cherokee County ===
- Kelley Denney Peacock: First woman to serve as the county attorney and judge of the Cherokee County Court at Law

=== Childress County ===
- Kim Jones: First female county judge in Childress County

=== Collin County ===
- Cyndi Wheless: First woman to serve as a mental health magistrate in the probate court of Collin County
- Angela Tucker: First African American (female) judge in Collin County (2012)

=== Comal County ===
- Jennifer Tharp: First female district attorney for Comal County (2011)
- Stephanie S. Bascon: First female district court judge in Comal County (2020)
- Sue Funk: First female municipal court judge in New Braunfels

=== Dallas County ===
- Louise Raggio (c. 1939): First female prosecutor in Dallas County
- Lillian Brock: First female lawyer in Dallas; Dallas County
- Adelfa B. Callejo: (1961) First Hispanic American female lawyer in Dallas; Dallas County
- Joan Winn: First African American female judge in Dallas; Dallas County (1975)
- Harriet Miers (1970): First woman to serve as president of the Dallas Bar Association (1986)
- Lena Levario: First Mexican American woman appointed as a district judge in Dallas County (1993)
- Margaret Keliher: First woman to serve as the Dallas County judge (2002–2006)
- Susan Hawk: First female district attorney for Dallas County (2015–2016)
- Faith Johnson: First African American female district attorney for Dallas County (2016)
- Audrey Moorehead: First woman (and African American woman) elected as the judge of Dallas County Criminal Court #3 (2018)
- Laura Benitez Geisler: First Hispanic American woman (and Hispanic American in general) to serve as president of the Dallas Bar Association (2018)

=== Delta County ===
- Ginny Phifer: First female justice of the peace in Delta County

=== Denton County ===
- Mary Horn: First female county judge in Denton County

=== Ector County ===
- Sara Kate Billingsley: First female district judge in Ector County (2015)

=== El Paso County ===
- Edith Shirley Abbott: First female lawyer in El Paso; El Paso County
- Edelmira Navarro: Reputed to be the first Latino American female lawyer in El Paso; El Paso County
- Kitty Schild (1972) and Janet Reusch: First female judges in El Paso; El Paso County
- Alicia R. Chacón: First Latino American woman elected as a judge in El Paso County (c. 1990s)
- Maxine Shaprow (1979): First African American female assistant district attorney for El Paso; El Paso County
- Yvonne Rosales: First female district attorney for El Paso County
- Rita Rodriguez: First Hispanic American (female) to serve as the City Attorney of El Paso, El Paso County, Texas (2001)

=== Ellis County ===
- Penny Redington: First woman elected as a county judge in Ellis County (1988)
- Barbara Warren: First female (and African American) judge in Waxahachie; Ellis County

=== Erath County ===
- Lanelle Harbin: First female judge in Erath County (1961)

=== Falls County ===
- Nita Wuebker: First woman to serve on the Falls County Commissioners Court (2015)

=== Fannin County ===
- Mildred Eileen Cox: First female county judge in Fannin County
- Laurine Blake: First woman to serve as a district court judge in Fannin and Grayson counties (c. 2004)

=== Fort Bend County ===
- Kathleen Lindsey: First female lawyer in Fort Bend County
- Toni Wallace: First African American female judge in Fort Bend County (2016)
- Juli Mathew: First judge of Asian descent to be elected to the Bench in Fort Bend County (2018); first Indian American woman elected to the bench in the US
- Jennifer C. Chiang: First Asian American appointed to serve on the Bench in Fort Bend County; first Asian American judge to serve on the Sugar Land Municipal Court (2015)
- Dora Olivo: First Latino American (female) to serve as a justice of the peace in Fort Bend County (2023)
- Bridgette Smith-Lawson: First African American woman to serve as a Ford Bend county attorney (2020)
- Erum Jivani: First South Asian (female) to serve as a municipal court judge in Sugar Land, Fort Bend County (2021)

=== Galveston County ===
- Susan P. Baker: First female judge in Galveston County (1991)

=== Gray County ===
- Rosa Jane White: First female lawyer to try a case in Pampa; Gray County

=== Grayson County ===
- Carol Siebman: First female judge in Grayson County
- Laurine Blake: First woman to serve as a district court judge in Fannin and Grayson counties (c. 2004)

=== Gregg County ===
- Olga Lapin: First female lawyer in Gregg County

=== Grimes County ===
- Andria Bender: First female district attorney for Grimes County (2017)

=== Guadalupe County ===
- Elizabeth Carrie Jandt: First female lawyer in Guadalupe County; first woman elected as county attorney

=== Harris County ===
- Gloria K. Bradford: First African American woman to try a case in the Harris County District Court
- Rosemary Saucillo Moreno: First Hispanic American woman to serve as a municipal court judge in Houston, Harris County (1974)
- Hannah Chow: First Asian American woman (and Asian American in general) to serve as a judge of the Harris County Criminal Court at Law No. 5 (1987)
- Phyllis Frye (1981): First openly LGBT person to serve as a judge of the Houston Municipal Court (2010)
- Jo Ann Delgado: First Latino American woman elected as a justice of the peace, Precinct 2, Place 1 of Harris County (2001)
- Pat Lykos: First female district attorney for Harris County (2009)
- Debra Ibarra Mayfield: First Latino American woman to serve as a county court judge in Harris County (2011)
- Lina Hidalgo: First female (and Hispanic woman of Colombian descent) elected as the Harris County judge (2018)
- Shannon Baldwin: First openly LGBT African American female judge in Harris County (2018)
- Fran Watson: First African American (female) to serve as a probate judge in Harris County (2024)
- Sofia Adrogué: First (Latino American) woman to serve as a judge of the 11th Division Texas Business Court in Harris County (2024)
- Rabeea Collier: First Muslim American (female) judge in Harris County, Texas (2018)
- Joyce M. Burg (1926): First female lawyer in Houston; Harris County
- Barbara Hartle: First openly LGBT woman to serve as a judge of the Houston Municipal Court (2006)
- MiHoa Vo: First Vietnamese American (female) to serve as an Associate Presiding Judge for the Houston Municipal Courts
- Sherry D. Tavel: First female municipal judge in Pasadena; Harris County

=== Harrison County ===
- Leggat Hagen: First female criminal district attorney for Harrison County

=== Hidalgo County ===
- Micaela Alvarez (1989): First woman (and Hispanic woman) appointed as a judge of the 139th Judicial District Court in Hidalgo County (1995); later became a district court judge
- Renee Rodriguez-Betancourt: First woman to become the youngest district court judge in Hidalgo County (2017)
- Carina Garza De Luna: First woman to serve as a municipal judge for Palmhurst, Hidalgo County (2021)

=== Hood County ===
- Nellie Gray Robertson: First woman to serve as the Hood County attorney (1918)
- Linda Steen: First female county judge in Hood County (1999)

=== Hudspeth County ===
- Becky Dean: First female judge in Hudspeth County

=== Hunt County ===
- Keli Aiken: First woman elected to serve as a district court judge in Hunt County

=== Hutchinson County ===
- Faye Blanks: First woman to serve as the county judge of Hutchinson County

=== Jasper County ===
- Ann Pickle: First woman to serve as the district attorney of Jasper County (2019)

=== Jeff Davis County ===
- Irene Love Martin: First woman to serve as a district court judge in Jeff Davis County (1936)

=== Jefferson County ===
- Lindsey Scott: First woman to become a state district judge in Jefferson County (2014)
- Sharae Reed: First African American (female) to serve as the City Attorney of Beaumont, Jefferson County, Texas (2026)

=== Jim Hogg County ===
- Lupita Almaraz: First woman to serve as the assistant county attorney of Jim Hogg County (2023)

=== Karnes County ===
- Barbara Shaw: First female county judge in Karnes County (c. 2010)

=== Kaufman County ===
- Maxine Darst Flatt (1976): First female lawyer in Kaufman County; later became a judge
- Erleigh Norville Wiley: First African American woman to serve as a judge and become the district attorney for Kaufman County (2014)

=== Kendall County ===
- Nicole Bishop: First (female) criminal district attorney for Kendall County (2017)
- Kirsten Cohoon: First (female) elected state district court judge of the 51st District Court in Kendall County (2018)

=== Kerr County ===
- Anne Overby: First female court commissioner in Kerr County

=== Kleberg County ===
- Irma L. Rangel (1969): First Hispanic American female lawyer in Kleberg County
- Norma Nelda: First woman elected to serve on the Kleberg County Commissioner's Court Precinct 2 (1998)

=== Lamar County ===
- Cindy Ruthart: First female justice of the peace in Lamar County

=== Liberty County ===
- Lois Marie Jett: First woman to earn a law degree in Liberty County
- Peggy Dunn: First woman elected judge in Liberty County (2007)
- Jennifer Bergman: First woman to serve as the district attorney in Liberty County (2021)

=== Limestone County ===
- Elenor Holmes: First woman to serve as the county judge of Limestone County (1995)

=== Live Oak County ===
- Tiffany McWilliams: First (female) attorney from Live Oak County elected as the district attorney for the 156th Judicial District (2025), a district that also serves Bee and McMullen counties

=== Llano County ===
- Mary S. Cunningham: First female judge in Llano County (2014)

=== Lubbock County ===
- Emma K. Boone (1918): First female lawyer in Lubbock County
- Patsy L. Smith Moore (1949): First female lawyer elected to public office in Lubbock County (upon becoming a judge of Lubbock County Court at Law, Number 2 in Lubbock, Texas; 1957); first woman appointed as a judge of the 72nd District Court; first female lawyer in Lubbock; first female president of the Lubbock County Bar Association in 1953
- Aurora Chaides Hernandez (1995): First Hispanic American woman to serve as Precinct 3 justice of the peace (1994) in Lubbock; Lubbock County

=== McLennan County ===
- Vicki Menard: First woman to serve as a state district judge in McLennan County
- Margaret Harris Amsler (1937): First woman to graduate from Baylor Law School;McLennan County

=== McMullen County ===
- Annie Bendele Crain: First woman to serve as the county judge of McMullen County (1967)

=== Medina County ===
- Francis C. Richter (1938): First female lawyer in Medina County

=== Midland County ===
- Barbara Culver: First female judge in Midland County (1962)
- Sylvia A. Chavez: First Hispanic American (female) judge in Midland County (2001)
- Teresa Clingman: First female district attorney for Midland County

=== Milam County ===
- Eva Burke Locklin: First woman to serve as a county commissioner in Milam County (1954)

=== Montague County ===
- Stacy Gamblin: First woman to serve as a commissioner in Montague County

=== Montgomery County ===
- Barbara Hale (1982): First woman to become the assistant county attorney for Montgomery County (1982–1989)

=== Morris County ===
- Lynda Munkres: First female judge in Morris County (2011)

=== Nacogdoches County ===
- Sue Kennedy: First female judge in Nacogdoches County

=== Navarro County ===
- Beatrice Robinson McCormick: First female judge in Navarro County

=== Newton County ===
- Leona Jones Choate: First female justice of the peace in Newton County (1974)

=== Nueces County ===
- Rene Haas: First female judge in Nueces County (1982)
- Hilda G. Tagle: First Hispanic American female judge in Nueces County (1985)
- Nanette Hasette: First Hispanic American woman to serve as a district court judge in Nueces County
- Barbara Canales: First woman (and Hispanic American woman) elected as a judge in Nueces County (2019)
- Irma L. Rangel (1969): First woman (and Hispanic American) to serve as the assistant district attorney for Corpus Christi
- Paula Waddle: First female municipal court judge in Corpus Christi (1982); Nueces County

=== Orange County ===
- Courtney Arkeen: First female state district judge in Orange County (2011)
- Krispen Walker: First woman to serve as the district attorney of Orange County (2025)

=== Panola County ===
- Lee Ann Jones: First female county judge in Panola County (2014)

=== Parker County ===
- Lynn Marie Johnson: First woman elected as a judge in Parker County (2016)

=== Potter County ===
- Nancy Tanner: First female judge in Potter County
- Titiana Frausto: First African American (female) judge in Potter and Randall counties (upon her appointment to the 181st Judicial District Court in 2020)
- Nancy "N.S." Garms: First woman to serve as president of the Amarillo Bar Association

=== Presidio County ===
- Cinderela Guevara: First female county judge in Presidio County

=== Randall County ===
- Titiana Frausto: First African American (female) judge in Potter and Randall counties (upon her appointment to the 181st Judicial District Court in 2020)
- Christy Dyer: First female judge in Randall County (2021)

=== Real County ===
- Bella Rubio: First female county judge in Real County (2018)

=== Robertson County ===
- Hazel Embra: First African American female judge in Robertson County (2015)

=== Rockwall County ===
- Lorie Grinnan: First woman to be re-elected as commissioner for Rockwall County

=== Rusk County ===
- Sandra Gay Hodges: First female judge in Rusk County (1987)

=== San Patricio County ===
- Tamara Cochran-May: First woman to serve as the county attorney for San Patricio County (2016)
- Margie Silva: First (Hispanic American) female district attorney for San Patricio County (2025)

=== Shackelford County ===
- Joanne Fincher: First female judge in Shackelford County (1977)

=== Shelby County ===
- Allison Harbison: First female judge in Shelby County (c. 2015)

=== Smith County ===
- Ruth Blake (1966): First female judge in Smith County
- Cynthia Kent: First woman elected as a judge in Smith County (1984)
- Ruth Yeager: First woman to serve as president of the Smith County Bar Association

=== Tarrant County ===
- Shirley W. Butts (1954): First female assistant district attorney in Tarrant County
- Brooke Allen: First female probate court judge in Tarrant County, Texas
- Dionne Phillips Bagsby: First African American woman elected to the Tarrant County Commissioners Court (1988)
- Sharen Wilson: First female district attorney for Tarrant County (c. 2017)
- Eva Barnes, née Bloore (1963): First female district judge in Tarrant County, Domestic Relations Court No. 1, which later became the 322nd District Court in 1977

=== Taylor County ===
- J.M. "Jo" Jameson: First female lawyer and judge (1968) in Taylor County
- Shawna Joiner: First woman to serve as justice of the peace in Taylor County (2022)

=== Terrell County ===
- Edelmira C. Calzada: First Mexican American (female) to serve as the justice of the peace in Terrell County (1980)

=== Titus County ===
- Irma Dunn: First Hispanic American (female) elected as a justice of the peace in Titus County

=== Tom Green County ===
- Marilyn Aboussie (1974): First female district judge in Tom Green County

=== Travis County ===
- Anna Sandbo: First female lawyer in Austin; Travis County
- Gloria K. Bradford: First African American woman to graduate from the University of Texas School of Law (1954)
- Mary Pearl Williams: First female judge in Travis County (1973)
- Leslie Taylor: First female justice of the peace in Travis County (1977)
- Margaret Moore: First woman to serve as Travis County attorney (1981)
- Elena Diaz: First Hispanic American (female) to serve as a justice of the peace in Travis County (1995)
- Julie Kocurek: First female district court judge in Travis County (1999)
- Lora Livingston: First African American woman to serve as a judge of the 261st District Court (1999); Travis County
- Rosemary Lehmberg: First female district attorney for Travis County (2009)
- Sarah Eckhardt (1998): First woman to serve as a county judge in Travis County (2015)
- Dimple Malhotra: First woman of South Asian descent to serve as a judge in Travis County (2019)
- Aurora Martinez Jones: First African American woman to preside over the 126th District Court in Travis County (2022)
- Denise Hernández: First openly lesbian Latino American woman elected as a county court judge in Travis County (2022)
- Velva L. Price: First African American woman to serve as president of the Austin Bar Association
- Amanda Arriaga: First Latino American woman to serve as president of the Austin Bar Association (2022)

=== Upshur County ===
- Lauren Parish: First female judge in Upshur County (c. 1994)

=== Upton County ===
- Peggy Garner: First female judge in Upton County (1974)

=== Van Zandt County ===
- Teresa Drum: First woman to serve as a judge of the 294th District Court in Van Zandt County

=== Victoria County ===
- Constance Filley Johnson: First woman to serve as the district attorney for Victoria County (2019)

=== Webb County ===
- Elma Salinas Ender: First Latino American woman to serve as a judge of the 341st Judicial District of Texas (1983); Webb County

=== Wichita County ===
- Charlye O. Farris (1953): First female lawyer (and African American woman) to practice law in Wichita County
- Arthur Beatrice "Bea" Williams: First African American (female) to serve as a justice of the peace and Wichita County judge
- Pat Norriss: First woman to serve on the commissioner's court in Wichita County
- Meredith Kennedy: First woman appointed as a judge of the 78th District Court in Wichita County (2019)

=== Willacy County ===
- Migdalia Lopez: First woman to serve as a district court judge in Cameron and Willacy counties

=== Williamson County ===
- Frances Fullerton (1932): First female lawyer in Williamson County
- Betsy Lambeth: First female district court judge in Williamson County (2012)

=== Wilson County ===
- Martha B. Schnabel: First female judge in Wilson County (1990)
- Denise Martinez: First female municipal court judge in Stockdale, Wilson County (2024)

=== Winkler County ===
- Mary Frances Clark: First female judge in Winkler County (1979)

=== Wise County ===
- Mary Velma Davenport: First female county judge in Wise County (c. 1938)

=== Zapata County ===
- Norma Villarreal Ramírez: First female county judge in Zapata County (1995)

== See also ==
- List of first women lawyers and judges in the United States
- Timeline of women lawyers in the United States
- Women in law

== Other topics of interest ==
- List of first minority male lawyers and judges in the United States
- List of first minority male lawyers and judges in Texas
