= Gaynelle Griffin Jones =

American jurist

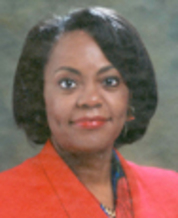

United States Attorney for the Southern District of Texas
- In office 1993–1997
- President: Bill Clinton
- Preceded by: Ronald G. Woods
- Succeeded by: Mervyn M. Mosbacker

Justice of the First Court of Appeals of Texas (Place 2)
- In office 1992–1993
- Appointed by: Ann Richards
- Preceded by: Jon N. Hughes
- Succeeded by: Adele Hedges

Personal details
- Born: Gaynelle Griffin; November 20, 1948 Dallas, Texas, U.S.
- Died: March 1, 2013 (aged 64) Houston, Texas, U.S.
- Spouse: Robert Jones
- Children: Athena
- Education: Emerson College (BA); Boston College (JD)

Gaynelle Griffin Jones (November 20, 1948 – March 1, 2013) was an American jurist and lawyer who was the former United States Attorney for the Southern District of Texas.

She was born in Dallas, Texas and graduated from A. J. Moore High School. Jones received her bachelor's degree from Emerson College and her J.D. degree from Boston College Law School. In 1993, President Bill Clinton appointed Jones as United States Attorney for the Southern District of Texas. She was the first woman and the first African American to serve in that position.

Before her appointment as U.S. Attorney, Jones was also the first African-American woman to serve on the First Court of the Texas Courts of Appeals. In later years, she worked as litigation counsel for Hewlett-Packard Company and was an adjunct professor at the University of Houston Law School.

She practiced law for forty years in Massachusetts, Louisiana, and Texas specializing in corporate law and criminal law.

She was married to Robert Jones and had a daughter named Athena.

== Death ==
She died on March 1, 2013, aged 64, in Houston, Texas, from cancer.

== See also ==
- List of African-American jurists
- List of first women lawyers and judges in Texas
