= Globe Life Field =

Baseball park in Arlington, Texas

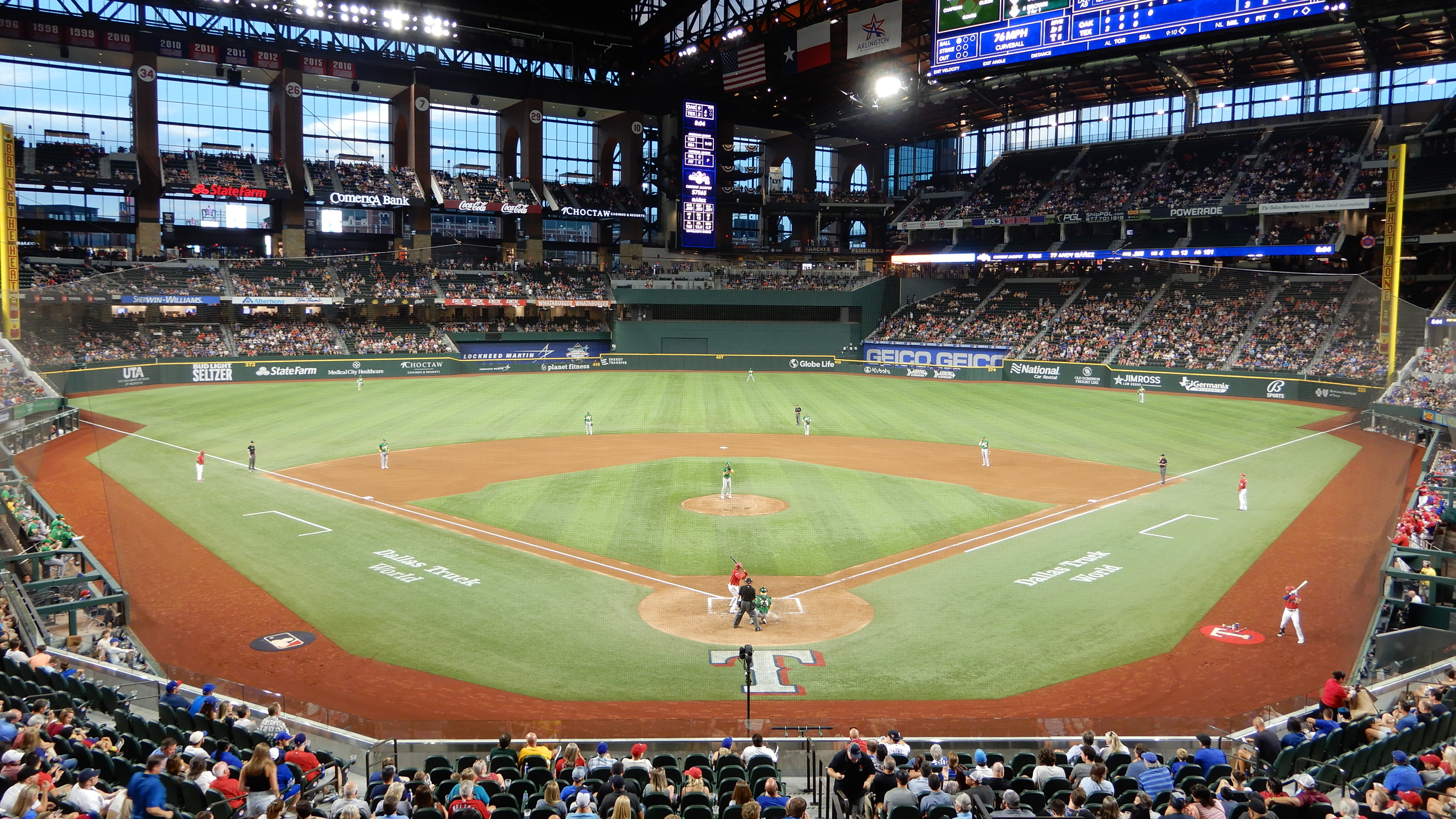
- Globe Life Field in 2021

- Location in Texas Location in the United States
- Address: 734 Stadium Drive
- Location: Arlington, Texas, U.S.
- Coordinates: 32°44′51″N 97°5′3″W
- Elevation: 278 feet (85 m)
- Owner: City of Arlington
- Operator: Rangers Baseball Express, LLC
- Capacity: 40,300
- Executive suites: 120
- Roof: Retractable
- Surface: Artificial turf
- Scoreboard: 111 feet wide and 40 feet tall
- Record attendance: 43,598 (Concert; Morgan Wallen; October 8, 2022)
- Field size: Baseball: Left field: 329 ft (100 m); Left center: 372 ft (113 m); Center field: 407 ft (124 m); Right center: 374 ft (114 m); Right field: 326 ft (99 m); Backstop: 42 ft (13 m)
- Acreage: 270

Construction
- Groundbreaking: September 28, 2017
- Opened: May 29, 2020 (high school graduation); July 21, 2020 (exhibition game); July 24, 2020 (regular season); October 12, 2020 (open to fans)
- Cost: $1.1 billion
- Architects: HKS, Inc. VLK Architects
- Structural engineer: Walter P Moore
- Services engineer: ME Engineers
- General contractor: Construction Manager: Manhattan Construction Company
- Main contractor: Manhattan Construction Company

Tenant
- Texas Rangers (MLB) (2020–present)

Website
- globelifefield.com

Globe Life Field is a retractable roof stadium in Arlington, Texas, United States. It is the home ballpark of Major League Baseball's Texas Rangers. It is located just south of the Rangers' former home ballpark, Globe Life Park (originally known as "The Ballpark in Arlington" and renamed "Choctaw Stadium" after the Rangers' departure and subsequent reconfiguration).

== History ==
=== Background ===
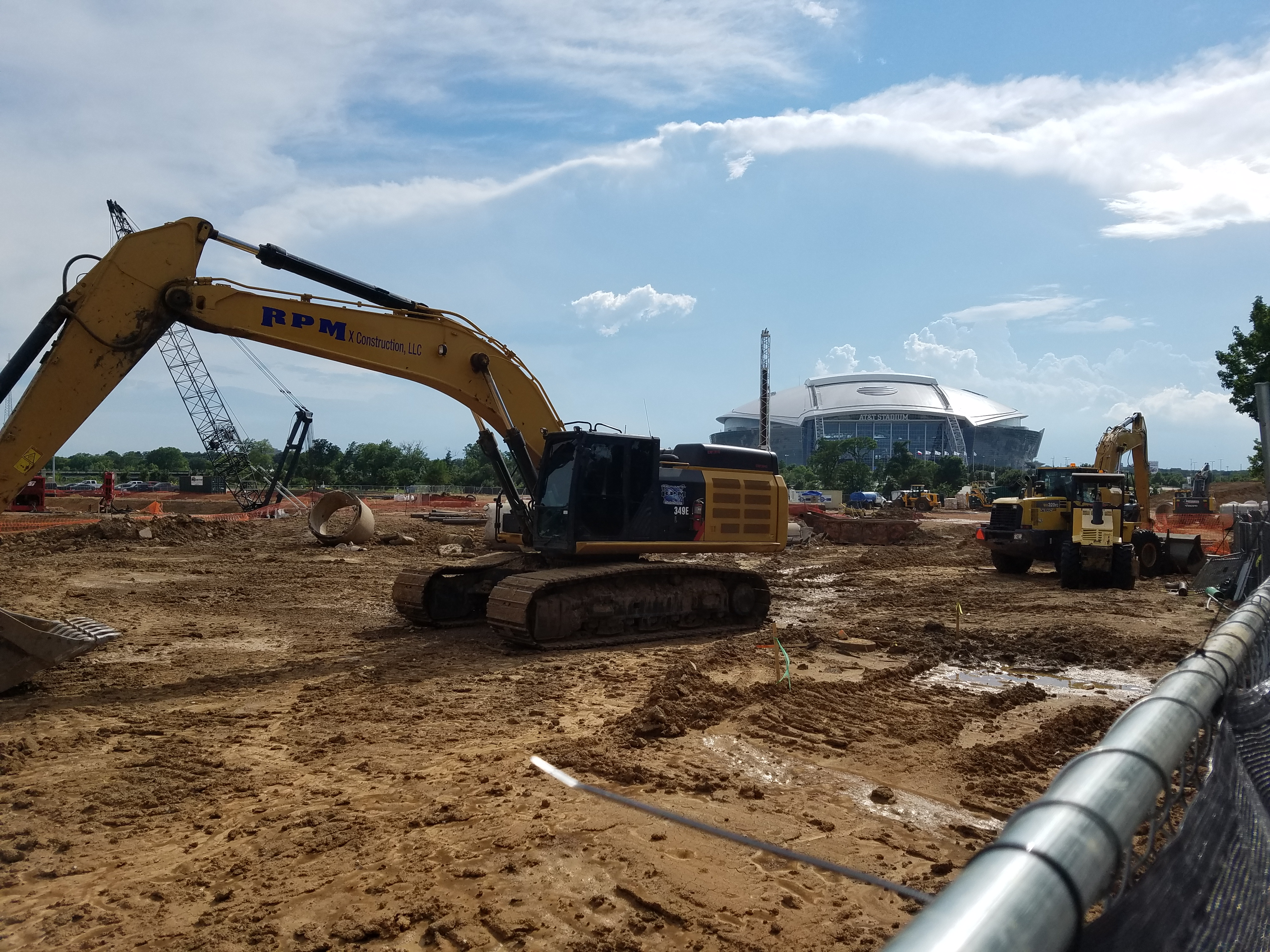
Construction site in 2017. AT&T Stadium is visible in the background.

On May 20, 2016, the Rangers announced that they would vacate Globe Life Park. The new stadium was to be constructed in a public/private partnership and have a retractable roof. The ballpark was approved on the following Election Day. HKS, Inc. was announced as the architect on January 5, 2017.

On January 31, 2019, the Rangers announced that the playing surface of Globe Life Field would be carpeted with synthetic grass supplied by Shaw Sports Turf, making them one of only five major league teams to play their home games on artificial turf.

The Rangers cited weather as the reason why attendance at Globe Life Park was lower than in other baseball stadiums in major metropolitan areas, as the area is prone to high temperatures and frequent rain, and also why the venue, despite being barely two decades old, was wearing out far more quickly than ballparks of a similar age such as Progressive Field and Coors Field. Therefore, the Rangers proposed that their new ballpark be constructed with a retractable roof. Unlike its predecessors, the new stadium's center field faces northeast rather than southeast.

A new shopping mall, a Loews Hotel, and a ballpark village were planned to go along with the new stadium. After the Rangers left Globe Life Park, it was then to be renovated for football and soccer use and renamed Choctaw Stadium.

The plans to build the stadium generated a mixed reaction. The new stadium offers a more comfortable environment to watch baseball but extended existing taxes used to pay for AT&T Stadium. According to The Dallas Morning News, "The deal calls for the city to issue $500 million in bonds to help pay for the stadium. A half-cent of sales tax, 2% hotel occupancy tax and 5% car rental tax would pay off those bonds over an estimated 30 years. Voters also approved a ticket tax of up to 10% and parking tax of up to $3 at the new stadium. That money would be used for some of the Rangers' portion of the debt, which was criticized by the opposition campaign."

On December 14, 2019, a section of the roof caught fire while under construction.

=== Opening ===
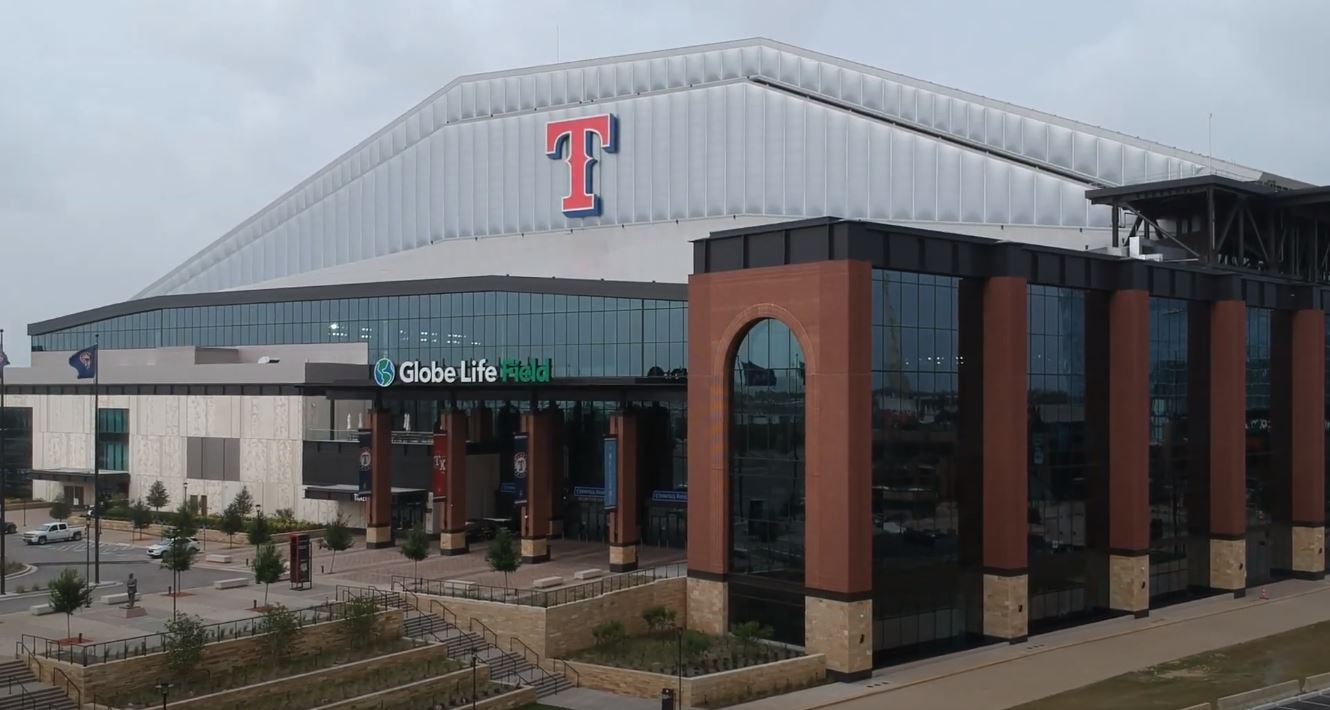
The exterior of Globe Life Field in 2020

Globe Life Field was originally scheduled to open on March 23, 2020, but because of the COVID-19 pandemic, the start of the 2020 Major League Baseball season was delayed for several months. Globe Life Field opened for a high-school graduation on May 29, 2020.

On July 24, 2020, the Rangers hosted their first regular-season game against the Colorado Rockies, which they won 1-0. The Rangers played two exhibition games against the Rockies on July 21 and 22 at Globe Life Field. Joey Gallo hit the first home run at the stadium on July 26.

=== 2020 MLB postseason ===
Because of the COVID-19 pandemic, Major League Baseball announced on September 15, 2020, that it would implement a playoff "bubble". Globe Life Field and Minute Maid Park in Houston shared the 2020 National League Division Series second-round playoff series, with one series in Houston and the other in Arlington. The 2020 National League Championship Series and the 2020 World Series were played exclusively at Globe Life Field. MLB allowed fans to attend games at Globe Life during the NLCS and World Series.

=== Naming rights ===
Globe Life and Accident Insurance Company owns the naming rights for the facility through 2048.

=== Ranger statue ===
On March 2, 2026, the One Riot, One Ranger statue, which had previously been installed at Dallas Love Field airport from 1961 until its removal in 2020, was installed in the left field concourse at Globe Life Field. The statue was modeled after Jay Banks, a former Texas Ranger officer known for enforcing school segregation at Mansfield High School and Texarkana Junior College in 1956. The Rangers received backlash for the installation from local community organizations, including the NAACP Arlington chapter. The team has declined to comment on the statue's installation in subsequent media requests.

== Dimensions ==
The marked dimensions of Globe Life Field pay extensive homage to Rangers history, honoring all of the team's retired numbers plus key seasons in team history.

Location	Distance (in feet)	Honoree	Significance
Left field line	329	Adrián Beltré	Retired #29
Left field just inside line	334	Nolan Ryan	Retired #34
Left field power alley	372	1972 Rangers	First season in Arlington
Deepest distance (to left and right of centerfield)	410	Michael Young	Retired #10
Center field (straightaway)	407	Iván Rodríguez	Retired #7
Right field power alley	374	1974 Rangers	First winning season in Arlington
Right field line	326	Johnny Oates	Retired #26
Home plate to backstop	42	Jackie Robinson	Number 42 retired throughout MLB

== Notable events ==
=== MLB ===
All 6 games of the 2020 World Series were held at Globe Life Field, making it the first and so far only venue to host a World Series without its tenant playing in the Series; this was due to the COVID-19 pandemic necessitating a neutral ground for the series.

The stadium saw Joe Musgrove throw the first no-hitter in San Diego Padres history against the Rangers on April 9, 2021.

Games 1 and 2 of the 2023 World Series (which the Rangers would end up winning in 5 games for their first championship) were hosted at the stadium.

The stadium also hosted the 2024 Major League Baseball All-Star Game.

=== National Finals Rodeo ===
The Professional Rodeo Cowboys Association (PRCA) held the 2020 National Finals Rodeo (NFR) at Globe Life Field instead of its usual location in Las Vegas due to the COVID-19 pandemic and Nevada's state-mandated health restrictions.

=== College football ===
On November 6, 2021, the ballpark hosted a college football game for the first time when Army and Air Force played in the Lockheed Martin Commanders' Classic. The Black Knights bested the Falcons, 21–14, in overtime. The day prior to the football game, the ballpark also hosted its first-ever boxing matches, with the boxing teams of each academy squaring off; Air Force won 6 bouts to 4.

Globe Life Field's football configuration has the end zones at left field and first base.

=== The American Rodeo ===
Globe Life Field has been the home of The American Rodeo since 2023 after previously having been held at AT&T Stadium from 2014 through 2022.

=== Concerts ===
Date	Artist	Opening act(s)	Tour / Concert name	Attendance	Revenue	Notes
July 24, 2021	Green Day; Fall Out Boy; Weezer	The Interrupters	Hella Mega Tour	37,519 / 37,519	$3,200,000	Originally scheduled for July 31, 2020, but was postponed due to the COVID-19 pandemic. Opening date of the tour, and first concert at the stadium.
August 21, 2021	Chris Stapleton	Willie Nelson; Jamey Johnson; Yola	Chris Stapleton's All-American Road Show Tour	—	—	First solo headliner at the stadium. Originally scheduled for March 14, 2020 as the first public event at the stadium, but was postponed due to the COVID-19 pandemic.
October 14, 2021	Aventura	—	—	—	—	
November 27, 2021	Metallica	—	Metallica 2021–2022 Tour	—	—	Part of Thriller Fright Club.
August 22, 2022	Def Leppard; Mötley Crüe	Poison; Joan Jett and the Blackhearts; Classless Act	The Stadium Tour	37,086 / 37,086	$5,561,368	Originally scheduled for July 14, 2020, and then August 22, 2021, but was postponed due to the COVID-19 pandemic.
August 23, 2022	Lady Gaga	—	The Chromatica Ball	38,056 / 38,056	$5,365,094	First female headliner at the stadium.
September 18, 2022	Red Hot Chili Peppers	The Strokes; Thundercat	2022 Global Stadium Tour	41,362 / 41,362	$6,035,404	
September 30, 2022	Elton John	—	Farewell Yellow Brick Road	38,316 / 38,316	$6,876,473	
October 8, 2022	Morgan Wallen	Ernest Keith Smith	Dangerous Tour	43,598 / 43,598	—	Fastest-selling and highest-attended concert at the stadium.
October 19, 2022	Brad Paisley	Tyler Braden	—	—	—	
June 21, 2023	TWICE	—	Ready To Be World Tour	—	—	First K-pop group to perform in a stadium in Texas.
August 30, 2023	Jonas Brothers	Lawrence	Five Albums. One Night. The World Tour	—	—	
September 30, 2023	RBD	—	Soy Rebelde Tour	38,075 / 38,075	$10,458,075	
June 15, 2024	Chris Stapleton	Tedeschi Trucks Band Marcus King	All-American Road Show Tour			
July 28, 2024	ATEEZ	—	Towards the Light: Will to Power World Tour			
August 12, 2024	Def Leppard; Journey	Steve Miller Band	The Summer Stadium Tour			
September 11, 2024	Green Day	The Smashing Pumpkins; Rancid; The Linda Lindas	The Saviors Tour			
November 6, 2024	Pink	Sheryl Crow; KidCutUp	Summer Carnival			Originally scheduled for September 29, 2023 and then November 26, 2023, but were rescheduled due to illness and unknown reasons respectively.
November 8, 2024	Linkin Park	Bad Omens; Jean Dawson; Helmet	From Zero World Tour	31,962 / 31,962	$3,354,774	
November 9, 2024	Cody Johnson	Jon Pardi Tracy ByrdElla Langley	Leather Tour			
June 6, 2025	Stray Kids		Dominate World Tour			The first act and Korean pop group who performed twice in a row at the venue.
June 7, 2025	Stray Kids		Dominate World Tour			The first act and Korean pop group who performed twice in a row at the venue.
June 11, 2025	Shakira		Las Mujeres Ya No Lloran World Tour	38,534 / 38,534	$5,138,848	First Latina to headline the venue.
August 2, 2025	My Chemical Romance	Garbage	Long Live The Black Parade			
August 16, 2025	ATEEZ		In Your Fantasy World Tour			
September 2, 2025	Chris Brown	Summer Walker; Bryson Tiller	Breezy Bowl XX Tour			The first singer who performed twice in a row at the venue.
September 3, 2025	Chris Brown	Summer Walker; Bryson Tiller	Breezy Bowl XX Tour			The first singer who performed twice in a row at the venue.
April 18, 2026	Bruno Mars	DJ Pee .Wee; Leon Thomas	The Romantic Tour			
April 19, 2026	Bruno Mars	DJ Pee .Wee; Leon Thomas	The Romantic Tour			
July 30, 2026	Noah Kahan	Gigi Perez Annabelle Dinda	The Great Divide Tour	40,000 / 40,000		
August 1, 2026	Forrest Frank	Tori Kelly; Cory Asbury; The Figs	The Jesus Generation Tour			
September 9, 2026	Guns N’Roses	Pierce The Veil	2026 World Tour			
December 29, 2026	Passion Worship		Passion 27			
December 30, 2026	Passion Worship		Passion 27			
December 31, 2026	Passion Worship		Passion 27			

=== Professional wrestling ===
On August 15, 2024, the American professional wrestling promotion All Elite Wrestling (AEW) announced that the 2025 edition of their biggest annual pay-per-view event, All In (also promoted as All In: Texas), would be held at Globe Life Field on July 12. This was the first professional wrestling event held at the stadium.

== See also ==
- List of ballparks by capacity
- List of current Major League Baseball stadiums
- Lists of stadiums

Events and tenants
Preceded by Choctaw Stadium	Home of the Texas Rangers; 2020–present	Current
Preceded by T-Mobile Park	Host of the All-Star Game; 2024	Succeeded by Truist Park
