= Harriet Daggett =

American lawyer

Dr. Harriet Spiller Daggett, Professor Emeritus (August 5, 1891—July 22, 1966) was an academic, lawyer, schoolteacher and law professor in Louisiana. She was one of the first female members of a law faculty in the US. In 1931, she became the first woman to become a full professor of law at an ABA-approved, AALS-member college, two years before Barbara Nachtrieb Armstrong at the University of California, Berkeley; a third female tenured law professor was not appointed until Margaret Harris Amsler at Baylor University Law School in 1941.

== Early and private life ==
She was born in Springfield, Livingston Parish, Louisiana, to Maria Louisa (née Dolan) and Blasingaim Spiller. She attended Louisiana State Normal College at Natchitoches, Louisiana (now Northwestern State University), graduating in 1909, and then taught mathematics and Latin in public schools in Jennings, Louisiana.

She married DeVan Damon Daggett of Jefferson Davis Parish in 1911. The couple had two children, DeVan Damon Daggett, Jr, who became a Professor at Loyola University New Orleans College of Law, and John D. Daggett, also a lawyer. Her husband died in 1955.

== Career ==
A collapse of her husband's rice-farming business caused the family to move to Baton Rouge. She matriculated at Louisiana State University (LSU), studying while her small children were at the parochial school nearby. She earned her AB in government in 1923, AM in 1925, LLB in 1926, and her MA in 1928.

She was an instructor at the School of Government from 1925; she was admitted to practice at the Louisiana bar in 1926 and named instructor in the Louisiana State University Law School the same year. She attended Yale Law School for one year, earning her JSD in 1929, and became a tenured associate professor at Louisiana State University Law School in 1930. She became a full professor in 1931, which position she maintained for 30 years, until she retired as a Professor Emeritus in 1961. She specialised in the legal fields of mineral rights, community property, and domestic relations. She published The Community Property System of Louisiana in 1931, and Mineral Rights in Louisiana in 1939, both leading works.

She was also named Chairman of the Louisiana Library Commission. She received a Distinguished Service citation from the School of Social Welfare at Louisiana State University, and co-founded the Family Court in East Baton Rouge Parish, Louisiana.

== Sources ==
- "Bibliography of Publications, 1929-1961", Louisiana Law Review, XXI (1961), pp. 687–696
- Obituary, Baton Rouge Morning Advocate, July 23, 1966.
