= Barbara Nachtrieb Armstrong =

American lawyer and law professor (1890–1976)

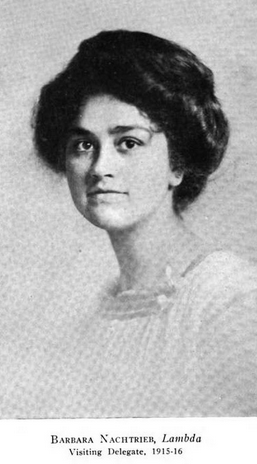
Barbara Nachtrieb, from a 1915 publication

Barbara Nachtrieb Armstrong (formerly Grimes; August 4, 1890 – January 18, 1976) was a lawyer and law professor in California. In 1923, she became the first woman to serve as a law professor at a law school of a major university, at the University of California, Berkeley School of Law. In 1935, she became the second woman to become a full professor of law at an ABA-approved, AALS-member college, two years after Harriet Spiller Daggett at Louisiana State University; a third female tenured law professor was not appointed until Margaret Harris Amsler at Baylor University Law School in 1941. Armstrong advocated social insurance throughout her career, and was a key figure in the development of the US Social Security system.

== Early life ==
She was born in San Francisco. Her parents were born in the Midwest, descended from German immigrants. She, her sister and two brothers attended local public schools. She them studied economics at University of California, Berkeley, graduating with a BA in 1913. She moved on to law school, where she was one of only two women in her class, and received a JD from Boalt Hall, the University of California's School of Jurisprudence, in 1915. She was admitted to the California Bar the same year.

== Career ==
She practiced law and was also executive secretary of the California Social Insurance Commission from 1915 to 1919. She returned to Berkeley in 1917 to study for a PhD in economics. She was appointed to a joint position on the faculty of the school of law and of the department of economics at Berkeley in 1919, the first woman faculty member at a law school approved by the American Bar Association.

She married Lymon Grimes in 1920, and received her PhD in 1921. Her daughter Patricia was born in 1922. She became an assistant professor in 1923 but was divorced in 1925. She remarried in 1926, to Ian Armstrong. She traveled in Europe in 1926 and 1927, studying social insurance systems.

She became an associate professor at Berkeley in 1928, and moved to the law faculty permanently, to teach law full-time. She was the first woman to become a full-time faculty member at a major US law school.

She published a book Insuring the Essentials: Minimum Wage Program in 1932, and became Chief of Staff for Social Security Planning of the Committee on Economic Security (CES), in 1934. She helped to draft the Social Security Act of 1935.

She was promoted to full professor in 1935. During the Second World War, she was the head of the Rent Enforcement Division of the San Francisco District Office of the US Office of Price Administration. She published a two-volume work on community property in 1953, and became the A.F. and May T. Morrison Professor of Law in 1955. She officially retired in 1957, but continued to work as a Professor Emeritus until 1965.

In February 1970, at the age of 79, three men robbed and savagely beat her, leaving her for dead. She managed to crawl to help, but never recovered her good health and lived in constant pain for the last six years of her life. Armstrong died on 18 January 1976, at the age of 85.
