= Neveille Colson =

American politician

Member of the Texas Senate from the 5th district
- In office January 11, 1949 – January 10, 1967
- Preceded by: Roger A. Knight
- Succeeded by: William T. Moore

Member of the Texas House of Representatives from the 27th district
- In office January 10, 1939 – January 11, 1949
- Preceded by: Robert Alfred Powell
- Succeeded by: Gary Pinkney Pearson

Personal details
- Born: July 18, 1902 Bryan, Texas, U.S.
- Died: March 3, 1982 (aged 79)
- Party: Democratic
- Spouse: Nall Colson (div. 1938)

Esther Neveille Higgs Colson (July 18, 1902 – March 3, 1982) was a state legislator in Texas. She served in the Texas House of Representatives and the Texas Senate. A Democrat who lived in Navasota, she served in the legislature from 1939 to 1966, and was the first woman to serve in both legislative houses.

== Biography ==
She was born July 18, 1902, in Bryan, Texas, to Walter and Ollie Higgs and went to Baylor University in 1923. After university she started teaching in Iola and shortly after married Nall Colson who went on to be elected to the Texas House of Representatives in 1932. She returned to study while he served until 1937 and then in 1938 they divorced.

Colson ran for the same 27th district seat representing Grimes County that her husband had previously occupied. She won and joined Margaret Harris Gordon in the house and the only other woman in the legislature. Colson served as a Democrat in the Texas House of Representatives from January 10, 1939, until January 11, 1949, and then in the Texas Senate from January 11, 1949, until January 10, 1967. During her second senatorial session she also served as the 54th Senate President Pro Tempore.

She championed roads and schools, including being the co-sponsor for the farm-to-market road system bill. She served as curator of the Sam Houston Memorial Museum in Huntsville, Texas, before retiring in 1977. The Neveille H. Colson Bridge over the Brazos River was named for her. She was living in Navasota in 1966 when she ran for re-election to the Senate, but she lost to Bill Moore another incumbent senator when they ran against each other after re-districting.

She died March 3, 1982, living her last few years in a nursing home and is buried in the Bryan City Cemetery.
