= Adelfa Botello Callejo =

American lawyer (1923–2014)

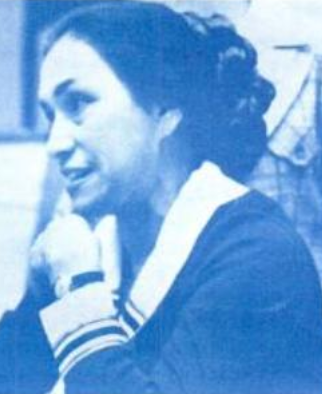
- Adelfa Callejo, from a 1978 publication of the Federal Women's Program
- Born: June 10, 1923; Millett, Texas
- Died: January 25, 2014 (aged 90); Dallas, Texas
- Occupations: Lawyer, civil rights activist

Adelfa Botello Callejo (June 10, 1923 – January 25, 2014) was an American lawyer and civil rights activist of Mexican descent. She was a recipient of the Mexican government's Ohtli award, the Dallas Bar Association's Martin Luther King Jr. Justice Award, the League of United Latin American Citizens Hispanic Entrepreneurship Award, the Mexican American Bar Association of Texas Lifetime Achievement Award, and the Sandra Day O'Connor Award.

== Biography ==
The daughter of Felix Botello and Guadalupe Guerra, she was born Adelfa Botello in Millett, Texas and was educated at Cotulla High School. Her father was born in Mexico; her mother, also of Mexican descent, was born in Texas. Callejo moved to Dallas in 1939 with her family and began taking night classes at Southern Methodist University (SMU). Near the end of World War II, she moved to California to help her brother after he was wounded in the war. There she began an import-export business and met William "Bill" F. Callejo; the couple were married in Dallas around 1946. She resumed her night classes at SMU, completing a law degree in 1961, the first Hispanic woman to graduate in law from SMU's Dedman School of Law. She opened her own law office, becoming the first Mexican American woman to practice law in Dallas. After her husband completed a law degree, they established the law firm of Callejo and Callejo.

She was co-founder of the Mexican-American Bar Association of Texas (later the Dallas Hispanic Bar Association), also serving as regional president of the Hispanic National Bar Association. Callejo was chairperson and founder of the Coalition of Hispanic Organizations. In 2012, she was named to the 50th Committee, charged with commemorating the 50th anniversary of the assassination of John F. Kennedy. She also served as president of the Dallas County Criminal Bar Association.

She was involved in protests against the killing of Santos Rodriguez in Pike Park in 1973 and against federal immigration policies in 2010. Callejo helped organize protests against the deportation of Mexican parents from Oak Cliff in 1982. She helped establish single member municipal electoral districts in Dallas which helped neighborhoods gain better representation at city hall; she also helped promote the development of a dropout prevention program in Dallas schools. She served on various boards including the Dallas Housing Authority, Dallas Area Rapid Transit, Dallas County Mental Health and Dallas-Fort Worth International Airport.

In 2004, Callejo and her husband donated over a million dollars to the SMU law school to establish the Adelfa Botello Callejo Leadership and Latino Studies Institute. With her husband, she was an officer of the Callejo-Botello Foundation.

She died in Dallas of brain cancer at the age of 90.

== Awards and honors ==
She received the Ohtli award from the Mexican government. In 2012, she was named a Texas Legal Legend by the State Bar of Texas. She also received the Dallas Bar Association's Martin Luther King Jr. Justice Award, the League of United Latin American Citizens Hispanic Entrepreneurship Award, the Mexican American Bar Association of Texas Lifetime Achievement Award and the Sandra Day O'Connor Award. Adelfa Botello Callejo Elementary school in Dallas was named in her honour.
