= Waldine Tauch =

American sculptor

- Born: Waldine Amanda Tauch; January 28, 1892; Schulenburg, Texas
- Died: March 31, 1986 (aged 94); San Antonio, Texas
- Known for: Sculpture

Waldine Amanda Tauch (January 28, 1892 -March 31, 1986) was an American sculptor. She was commissioned by the Texas Centennial Commission to create the monument "The First Shot Fired For Texas Independence".

== Biography ==
Tauch born in Schulenburg, Texas, to William and Elizabeth Heimann Tauch. Tauch's father was an early photographer in Texas.

Beginning in 1910 she left home to train in San Antonio with Italian-Texan sculptor Pompeo Coppini and her career was intertwined with his, as student, then apprentice, then partner. Apart from two stints in Chicago (1919–1922) and New York City (1923–1935) she remained based in San Antonio. Most of her sculptural work is in Texas.

Tauch was a member of art organizations, including the Society of Medalists, the Southern States Art League, the American Artists Professional League, the National Society of Arts and Letters, the San Antonio Art League, and the National Association of Women Painters and Sculptors.

1964 she was elected a fellow of the National Sculpture Society.

Tauch died on March 31, 1986, in San Antonio.

== Selected works ==
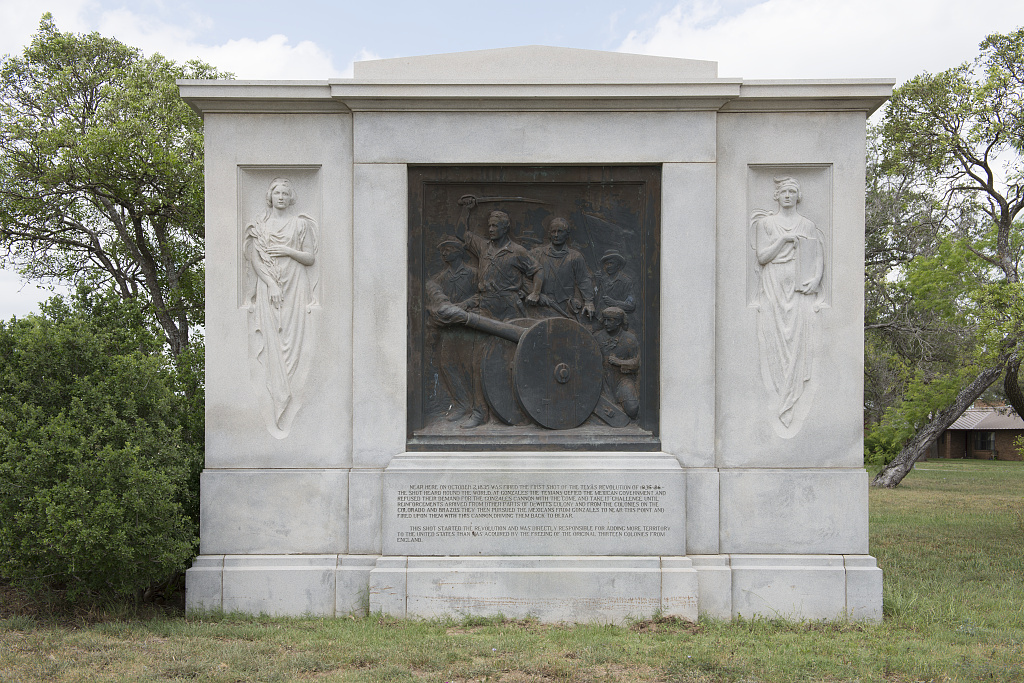
"The First Shot Fired For Texas Independence" (1935)

- Douglas MacArthur at Howard Payne University, Brownwood
- Higher Education Reflects Responsibility to the World (1965),' at Trinity University, San Antonio
- Texas Ranger of Today (1960), at the Union Terminal, Dallas
- Pippa Passes, at Baylor University, Waco
