= Margaret Harris Amsler =

American lawyer and law professor (1908-2002)

Margaret Greer Amsler (née Harris, formerly Gordon; June 15, 1908 – May 14, 2002) was a law professor in Texas. In 1955, she became the third female full law professor at a US law school, after Harriet Spiller Daggett in 1931 and Barbara Nachtrieb Armstrong in 1935. She was inducted into the Texas Women's Hall of Fame in 1987.

== Early and private life ==
She was born in Waco, Texas on June 15, 1908 to Nathaniel Harris, then assistant county attorney under Pat Neff, and Margaret Foster (Greer) Harris. She was the third of five children and the eldest daughter. Her father taught law at Baylor University from 1920 to 1944. Her mother also graduated from Baylor, where she had moved to accompany her older brother who was a professor of Latin and Greek.

She graduated with an AB from Baylor University in 1929, in English and French, and then an MA in English literature from Wellesley College in 1931. She then taught at a Texas high school. She attended law school from 1935, graduating with an LLB in 1937; she was the only woman in her class, and graduated in first place.

She married her first husband, John Kenneth Gordon in 1933. After they were divorced, she remarried in 1942 to the lawyer Sam H. Amsler Jr. They had one daughter.

== Career ==
She was elected to the Texas Legislature in 1938, defeating seven other male candidates. Like all of the 150 people elected to the Texas House of Representatives in the Forty-sixth Texas Legislature, she was a Democrat. She represented McLennan County from 1939 to 1941, one of two women in the Texas House that term, alongside 149 other Democrats. She was not reelected, but the other woman representative, Neveille Colson served for many years until 1948 and was then a Texas state senator until 1966.

She was the first woman to serve as a marshal of the Supreme Court of Texas, and the first woman employed by the court as a briefing attorney, in 1942. She also practised law with her second husband in McGregor, Texas.

She taught law at Baylor from 1941 to 1944. The law school closed from 1944 to 1946 due to the Second World War; when it reopened, she was acting Dean. She taught business law, becoming an associate professor in 1947 and a full professor in 1955. She received her JD in 1969.

She was part of the commission that drafted the Texas Business Corporation Act of 1955, and the commission that drafted the Texas laws for non-profit corporations of 1959. She also drafted the Texas Married Women's Act of 1963, to grant rights possessed by men and unmarried women, allowing a married woman to enter into a contract, sue, or sell property without her husband's permission.

She received the (inaugural) President's Award from the Texas State Bar in 1961.

She retired from teaching in 1972, but continued to practise law until she retired a second time in 1990. She was inducted into the Texas Women's Hall of Fame in 1987.

From 1977 to 1979, she served on the Texas Board of Law Examiners, and she was house counsel to the Texas Society of the Daughters of the American Revolution. In 1989, she was elected to the Common Cause National Governing Board.
