= Edna Cisneros =

American lawyer

Edna Cisneros (later Edna Cisneros Carroll; 1930-2013) was Texas’ first Mexican American female lawyer.

Cisneros was born on February 2, 1930, in Raymondville, Texas, to grocer Manuel Cisneros and Benita de la Garza. She earned her Bachelor of Business Administration (1952) from the University of Texas and a Bachelor of Laws (1955) upon attending the university’s law school. In 1955, she became the first Hispanic female admitted to practice law in Texas. Her sister Diana Cisneros Klefisch also became an attorney the following year. Cisneros initially joined a criminal law firm before launching a successful campaign in 1956 to become the District Attorney of Willacy County (a position that she held for approximately thirty years). Thus, Cisneros achieved another historical feat by becoming the first female to serve as a district attorney in Texas. Since Diana also became a prosecutor, there was various cases in which the sisters represented opposing sides. In 1959, Cisneros married Charles Ernest Carroll. She died on July 26, 2013, in Harlingen, Texas.

== See also ==
- List of first women lawyers and judges in Texas
