= List of African-American women in medicine =

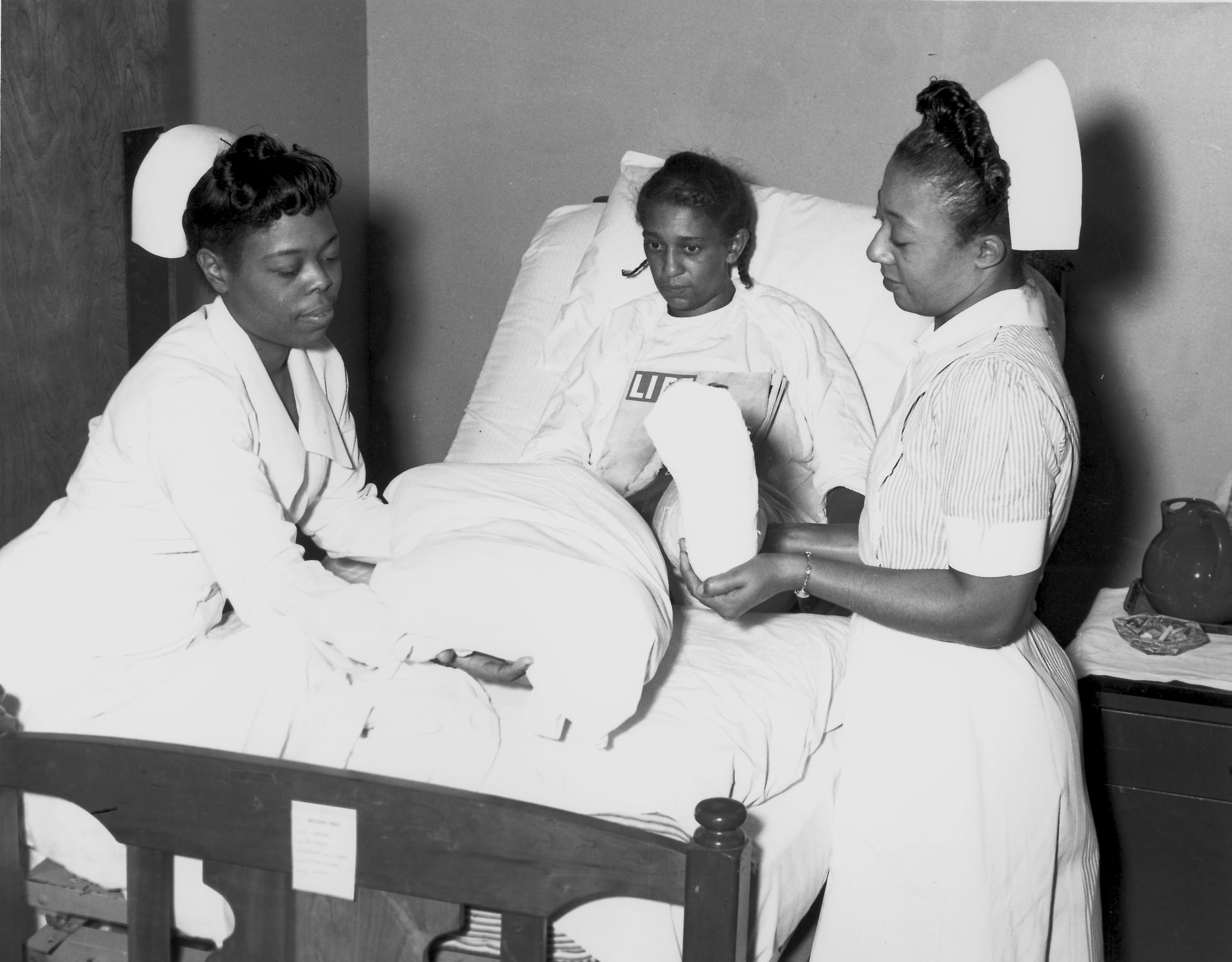
Nurses at Oak Ridge Hospital in the 1940s

African-American women have been practicing medicine informally in the contexts of midwifery and herbalism for centuries. Those skilled as midwives, like Biddy Mason, worked both as slaves and as free women in their trades. Others, like Susie King Taylor and Ann Bradford Stokes, served as nurses in the Civil War. Formal training and recognition of African-American women began in 1858 when Sarah Mapps Douglass was the first Black woman to graduate from a medical course of study at an American university. Later, in 1864 Rebecca Crumpler became the first African-American woman to earn a medical degree. The first nursing graduate was Mary Mahoney in 1879. The first dentist, Ida Gray, graduated from the University of Michigan in 1890. It was not until 1916 that Ella P. Stewart became the first African-American woman to become a licensed pharmacist. Inez Prosser in 1933 became the first African-American woman to earn a doctorate in psychology. Two women, Jane Hinton and Alfreda Johnson Webb, in 1949, were the first to earn a doctor of veterinary medicine degree. Joyce Nichols, in 1970, became the first woman to become a physician's assistant.

African-American women have continued to make major contributions to the field of medicine throughout the 20th and 21st centuries. Dr. Marilyn Hughes Gaston, who in 1986 became the first African-American woman to direct a public health service bureau, led groundbreaking research on sickle cell disease that transformed federal screening programs for newborns. Dr. Joycelyn Elders became the first African-American woman to serve as U.S. Surgeon General in 1993, advocating for comprehensive health education and public health reform. Dr. Mae Jemison, a physician and astronaut, made history in 1992 as the first Black woman to travel into space, integrating her medical training with scientific exploration. In recent decades, African-American women have also led major institutions—Dr. Valerie Montgomery Rice became the first woman president and dean of Morehouse School of Medicine in 2014, while Dr. Ala Stanfordfounded the Black Doctors COVID-19 Consortium in 2020 to address racial disparities in pandemic care. Their achievements reflect a long legacy of resilience and innovation among African-American women in medicine, who continue to expand access, equity, and representation in health care today.

This is an alphabetical list of African-American women who have made significant firsts and contributions to the field of medicine in their own centuries.

== 1800s ==
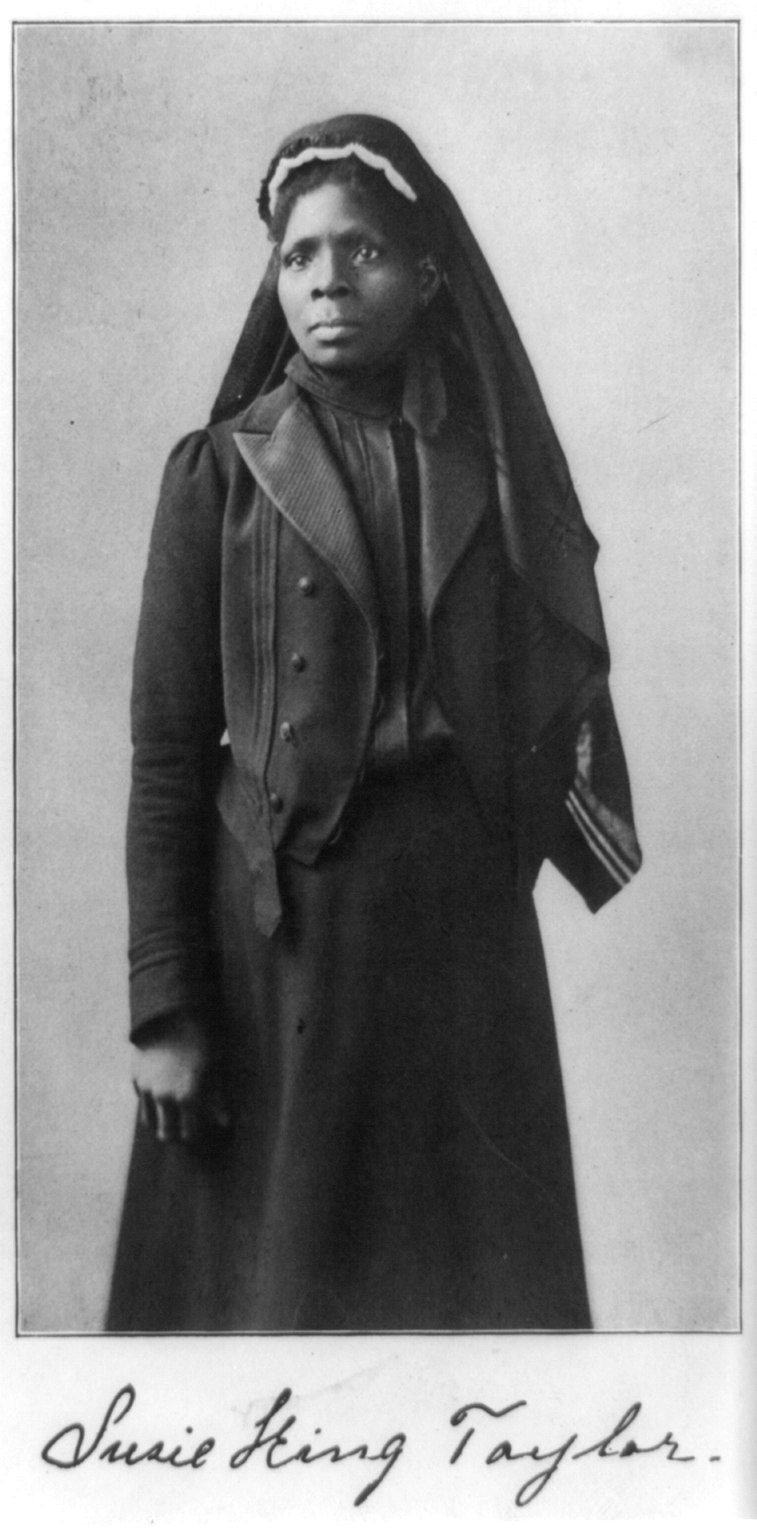
Susie Baker, later Susie Taylor, a Civil War nurse

A

- Caroline V. Still Anderson set up a successful clinic and dispensary in Philadelphia.

B

- Anna DeCosta Banks, who graduated nursing school in 1891, had a long and successful career as a nurse in both the 19th and 20th centuries.
- Lucy Hughes Brown in 1894 became the first African American woman physician in North Carolina, and then later in the decade, the first in South Carolina.
- Mary Louise Brown graduated from Howard University Medical School in 1898 and went on to do post-doctorate work in Edinburgh, Scotland.

C

- Consuelo Clark-Stewart graduated from Boston University School of Medicine in 1884 and was the first African-American woman to practice in Ohio.
- Rebecca J. Cole in 1867, became the second African-American woman to earn a medical degree in the United States and the first to graduate from the Women's Medical College of Pennsylvania, now known as the Medical College of Pennsylvania.
- Rebecca Davis Lee Crumpler in 1864 was the first African-American woman to earn a medical degree in the United States.

D

- Sarah Mapps Douglass became the first woman to complete a medical course of study at an American university in 1858 when she graduated from the Ladies' Institute of the Pennsylvania Medical University.
- Juan Bennett Drummond, 1888 graduate of the Women's Medical College of Pennsylvania, became the first African American woman doctor licensed in Massachusetts.

E

- Matilda Evans in 1897 became the first African American woman to earn a medical license in South Carolina.

F

- Sara Iredell Fleetwood graduated from the Freedmen's Hospital Nursing Training School in 1896.
- Louise Celia Fleming in 1891 became the first African American woman to enroll in the Women's Medical College in Philadelphia.
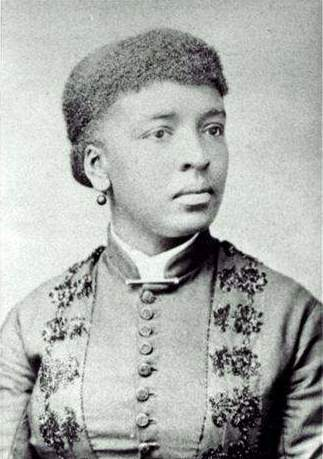
  Louise Celia Fleming, an early African American physician
- Martha Minerva Franklin graduated from nursing school in 1897 and worked to improve racial equality in nursing.
- Sarah Loguen Fraser in 1879 became the first woman and African American to graduate from the Syracuse College of Medicine and became the fourth African American woman to become a doctor.

G

- Artishia Garcia Gilbert in 1898 became the first African American woman to register as a licensed physician in Kentucky.
- Mildred Wilborn Gildersleeve served as a nurse and midwife in Florida during the Reconstruction Era. Born enslaved in 1858, she was inducted into the Florida Women's Hall of Fame in 2019.
- Ida Gray became the first African American woman to become a dentist when she graduated from the University of Michigan in 1890.
- Eliza Ann Grier in 1897 became the first African-American woman to practice medicine in the state of Georgia.

H

- Julia R. Hall in 1892 became the first African American woman to work as a resident in the gynecology clinic of Howard University.

J

- Halle Tanner Dillon Johnson was an American physician and the first woman to be licensed as a physician in the U.S. state of Alabama.
- Sarah Garland Boyd Jones in 1893 became the first woman physician licensed in Virginia.
- Sophia B. Jones was a Canadian-born American medical doctor, who founded the nursing program at Spelman College. She was the first Black woman to graduate from the University of Michigan Medical School and the first Black faculty member at Spelman.

M

- Mary Mahoney was the first African-American to graduate from nursing training, graduating in 1879.
- Biddy Mason, a slave, worked as a midwife and later set up a day care and a nursery in Los Angeles.
- Alice Woodby McKane the first African-American woman to practice medicine in the state of Georgia.
- Mary Susan Moore became the first African-American woman physician to practice medicine in Texas between 1898 and 1901.
- Verina Morton-Jones in 1888 became the first woman to be licensed as a physician in Mississippi.

P

- Georgia E. Lee Patton, 1893 medical school graduate who went on to practice medicine in Africa.
- Beulah Wright Porter, in 1897 became the first African American woman physician in Indianapolis.

R

- Sarah Parker Remond earned her medical license in 1871 in Italy.
- Emma Ann Reynolds was a teacher who had a desire to address the health needs of her community. Refused entrance to nurses training schools because of racism, she influenced the creation of Provident Hospital in Chicago and was one of its first four nursing graduates. Continuing her education, Reynolds became a medical doctor serving at posts in Texas, Louisiana and Washington, D.C. before permanently settling in Ohio and completing her practice there.
- Harriet Rice in 1887 was the first African American to graduate from Wellesley College.

S

- Eunice P. Shadd was the first African-American woman to graduate from Howard University College of Medicine.
- Nannette Stafford, 1878 medical school graduate from Howard University.
- Susan Smith McKinney Steward in 1870 became the third African-American woman to become a physician and the first to graduate from a New York medical school when she graduated from the New York Medical College for Women.
- Ann Bradford Stokes in January 1863 was enlisted as a ships' nurse in the United States Navy.

T

- Susie King Taylor, first African-American to serve as a U.S. Army Nurse in the Civil War.
- Sojourner Truth worked as a nurse while she was enslaved. Later, she advocated for formal training.

W

- Emma Wakefield-Paillet in 1898 became the first African American woman physician in Louisiana.
- Georgia E. L. Patton Washington in 1893 became the first woman to earn a medical degree from Meharry Medical College.
- Marie Imogene Williams in 1896 became the first African American female dentist to graduate from Howard University's dental school.
- Alice Woodby McKane in 1892 earned her medical degree and later went on to open the first hospital in Monrovia, Liberia in 1895 with her husband, Cornelius McKane.

== 1900s ==
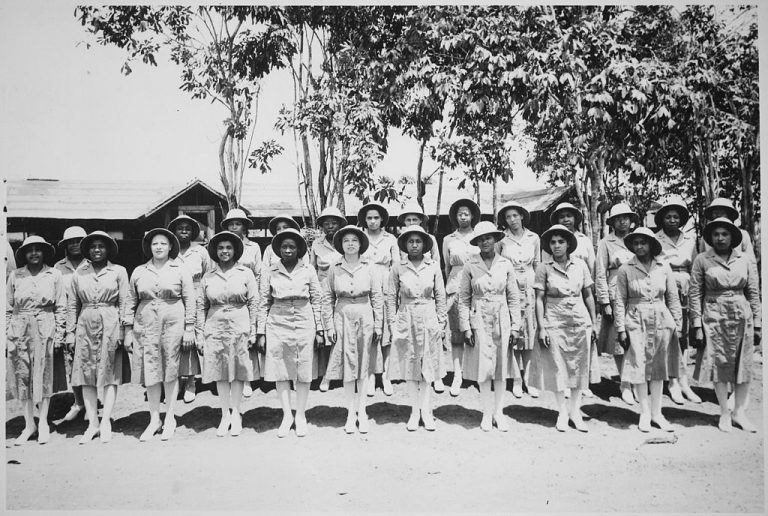
25th Station Hospital Unit, U.S. Army Black Nurses In Liberia during WWII

#

- 25th Station Hospital Unit, an all African-American unit as part of the Army Nurse Corps, was the first Black medical unit sent overseas during World War II.

A

- Lucile Adams-Campbell in 1983 became the first African-American woman to earn a Ph.D. in epidemiology in the United States. In 1995 as director of the Howard University Cancer Center in Washington D.C., she became the first Black woman to head a cancer center.
- Clara Adams-Ender in 1967 became the first woman to be awarded the United States Army's Expert Field Medical Badge.
- Virginia Alexander was a public health official and physician in Philadelphia who founded the Aspiranto Health Home in 1931 for the poorest members of her community.
- Ludie Clay Andrews became the first registered nurse in Georgia in 1920.
- L. Eudora Ashburne in 1912 became the first African-American woman to graduate from Howard University School of Medicine and the first general practice physician in Virginia.
- Byllye Avery in 1984 founded the National Black Women's Health Project.

B

- Margaret E. Bailey in 1970 became the first African American nurse to attain the rank of colonel in the United States Army.
- Cynthia Barnes-Boyd was an academic administrator, professor, and nurse. She was the director of the Office of Community Engagement and Neighborhood Health Partnerships at the University of Illinois Chicago (UIC), and executive director of the University of Illinois Mile Square Health Center.
- Edwina Margaret Barnett in 1973 was one of the first two African-American women to earn a Doctor of Medicine (MD) from Johns Hopkins University School of Medicine. (The other was Patricia Ann Jenkins.)
- Patricia Era Bath, first African American to complete a residency in ophthalmology.
- Sandra Dian Battis in 1975 was one of the first two African-American women to earn a Doctor of Medicine (MD) degree from the University of California at Davis School of Medicine. (The other was Diane Loren Pemberton.)
- Lillian Beard is a pediatrician and has served as a spokesperson for the American Academy of Pediatrics.
- Sabrina Ann Benjamin in 1981 was the first African-American woman to earn a Doctor of Medicine (MD) degree from the Uniformed Services University of the Health Sciences (Maryland).
- Elizabeth Bertram in 1977 became the first African-American woman to earn a Doctor of Medicine (MD) degree from Southern Illinois University School of Medicine.
- Hattie Bessent in 1976 became the first African American to serve as graduate dean at Vanderbilt University Graduate School of Nursing.
- JudyAnn Bigby served as director of the Harvard Medical School Center of Excellence in Women's health.
- Bessie Blount Griffin was a writer, nurse, physical therapist, inventor and forensic scientist.
- Juliann Bluitt Foster became the first African American full-time faculty at the Northwestern University Dental School in 1967.
- Frances Jones Bonner in 1949 was the first African-American woman to train and to become a faculty member at Massachusetts General Hospital
- Etnah Rochelle Boutte was a pharmacist and the only African American woman elected to the New York City Cancer Commission in 1951.
- Marcia Clair Bowling in 1978 was one of the first two African-American women to earn a Doctor of Medicine (MD) degree from the University of Massachusetts Medical School. (The other was Vernette Jones Bee.)
- Nancy Boyd-Franklin was named distinguished psychologist of the year by the Association of Black Psychologists in 1994.
- Goldie D. Brangman-Dumpson was one of the surgical team at Harlem Hospital that saved Martin Luther King Jr. in 1958.
- Clara Brawner was the only African American woman practicing medicine in the Memphis area in the mid-1950s.
- Mary Elizabeth Britton in 1904 became the first African American woman licensed as a physician in Lexington, Kentucky.
- Rochelle A. Broome in 1983 was one of the first African Americans to earn a Doctor of Medicine (MD) degree from Northeastern Ohio University College of Medicine. (The others were Margo Shamberger, Yvonne A. Patterson, and John D. Lewis.)
- Dorothy Lavinia Brown was the first African American woman working in general surgery residency in the Southern United States, where she started in 1948.
- Edna C. Robinson Brown was the first African-American woman to practice dentistry in Cambridge, Massachusetts. She began her practice in 1916 as the only African-American woman dentist in New England.
- Lorna K. Brown was one of the first two African-American women to graduate from Case Western Reserve University School of Medicine in 1968 (the other was Doris A. Evans)
- Zora Kramer Brown served on the National Cancer Advisory Board between 1991 and 1998 and was the first African American woman to hold that position.
- Carrie E. Bullock, a Chicago nurse, worked to promote the National Association of Colored Graduate Nurses (NACGN).
- Carol E. Burnett was the first African-American woman to earn a Doctor of Medicine (MD) degree from Albert Einstein College of Medicine of Yeshiva University.
- Prudence Burns Burrell was one of the small number of African American nurses in the Army Nurse Corps during World War II.

C

- Barbara McDonald Calderon was the first public health nurse in Iowa.
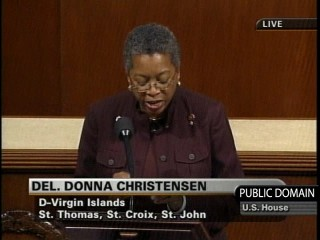
  Donna Christian-Christensen, the first woman and African-American physician to serve in the United States Congress on C-SPAN.
- Lori Margaret Campbell in 1983 was one of the first two African Americans, and the first African-American woman, to earn a Doctor of Medicine (MD) degree from the University of Hawaiʻi at Mānoa. (The first African-American man who graduated at the same time was Paul Jeffrey Smith.)
- Alexa Canady is the first African-American woman to become a neurosurgeon and practiced as a pediatric neurosurgeon.
- Denise L. Capel in 1979 was one of the first two African-American women to earn a Doctor of Medicine (MD) degree from the University of Utah School of Medicine. (The other was Marjorie S. Coleman.)
- Mary Elizabeth Carnegie, worked as a clinical instructor and dean of the nursing school of Florida A&M University.
- Joye Maureen Carter in 1992 became the first African American in the United States to hold the position of Chief Medical Examiner (in DC), and in 1996 became the first African American and first woman to hold the position of Chief Medical Examiner in Texas.
- Frances Justina Cherot in 1954 was the first African American to earn a Doctor of Medicine from the State University of New York Health Science Center at Brooklyn
- May Edward Chinn in 1926 became the first African American woman to hold an internship at Harlem Hospital.
- Cora LeEthel Christian, who also worked in the Virgin Islands, became the first African American woman to earn her medical degree at Jefferson Medical College in 1971.
- Donna Christian-Christensen, in 1997 became the first woman physician and first African-American physician to serve in the United States Congress.
- June Jackson Christmas served as the New York City Commissioner of Mental Health, Mental Retardation, and Alcoholism Services (1972–1980).
- Lillian Atkins Clark was chief resident at the Douglass Hospital in Philadelphia starting in 1924.
- Mamie Phipps Clark was a psychologist who worked on research regarding black children and education.
- Patience Hodges Claybon in 1974 was the first African-American woman to earn a Doctor of Medicine (MD) degree from the University of Alabama School of Medicine.
- Maceola L. Cole in 1958 was the first African-American woman to earn a Doctor of Medicine degree from Saint Louis University School of Medicine.
- Beverly Coleman in 1987 was the first African-American woman appointed full professor of Radiology at the University of Pennsylvania
- Marjorie S. Coleman in 1979 was one of the first two African-American women to earn a Doctor of Medicine (MD) degree from the University of Utah School of Medicine. (The other was Denise L. Capel.)
- Mattie E. Coleman in 1932, an African American physician, became the first graduate of the dental program at Meharry Medical College.
- Viola Mary Johnson Coleman was the first African-American female physician to practice medicine in Midland, Texas.
- Anna Bailey Coles was the founding dean of Howard University's College of Nursing, created in 1969.
- Mary Francis Hill Coley in 1930 became a midwife who delivered both Black and white babies and as well as delivered more than 3,000 babies
- Natalear R. Collins in 1981 was one of the first two African Americans to earn a Doctor of Medicine (MD) degree from the East Carolina University School of Medicine. (The other was Brenda Mills Klutz.)
- M. E. Thompson Coppin was the 10th African American woman to become a medical doctor in the United States.
- Patricia Cowings was hired to work as a psychophysiologist at NASA in 1978.
- Sadye Curry in 1972 became the first African American woman gastroenterologist.

D

- Darlene Dailey in 1978 was one of the first two African-American women to earn a Doctor of Medicine (MD) degree from Vanderbilt University. (The other was Janis Adelaide Jones.)
- Phyllis Mae Dailey was an American nurse and officer who became the first African-American woman either to serve in the United States Navy or to become a commissioned Naval officer.
- Donna P. Davis in 1975 became the first African American physician in the United States Navy.
- Frances Elliott Davis in 1919 became the first African American nurse officially recognized by the American Red Cross.
- Bessie Delany, who graduated from the Columbia University School of Dental and Oral Surgery in 1923 became the second African American woman to be licensed as a dentist in New York State.
- Clotilde Dent Bowen was a psychiatrist who was the first African-American woman to graduate in medicine from Ohio State University (in 1947), the first Black physician to hold a military commission, and the first woman commander of a U.S. military hospital. Bowen was also the first African-American woman to reach the rank of colonel in the U.S. Army.
- Edith DeVoe was the second Black woman admitted to serve in the United States Navy Nurse Corps during World War II, the first Black nurse to be admitted to the regular Navy, and was the first Black nurse to serve in the Navy outside the mainland United States.
- Helen O. Dickens, in 1950 became the first African-American woman to become part of the American College of Surgeons, and in 1956, became the first African-American woman full professor at the Perelman School of Medicine at the University of Pennsylvania
- Janice Douglas in 1984 became the first woman to hold the rank of professor of medicine at Case Western Reserve University School of Medicine.
- Lillian Singleton Dove, who graduated from Meharry Medical College in 1917, may have been one of the first African American woman surgeons. She also wrote regular news columns about health in the Chicago Defender.
- Rhetaugh Graves Dumas in 1981 was the first African American to be named dean of the University of Michigan School of Nursing. Also in 1976, she was the first woman, first African American, and first nurse to serve as deputy director of the National Institute for Mental Health (NIMH)
- Georgia Dwelle in 1906 became the first African-American woman to practice medicine in Atlanta, Georgia; and in 1920, established the first general hospital for African Americans in Georgia.

E

- Ruth Marguerite Easterling was an American physician and pathologist who worked with William Augustus Hinton to develop the Hinton test for syphilis. She also served on the staff of the Tuskegee Veterans Administration Hospital in Alabama, and was director of laboratories at the Cambridge Massachusetts City Hospital.
- Lena F. Edwards was a physician who helped low income and migrant workers. In 1964, she was the first African American woman to receive the Presidential Medal of Freedom.
- Willarda V. Edwards is the first African-American woman to serve as the president of the Baltimore Medical Society.
- Joycelyn Elders was the first African American appointed as Surgeon General of the United States in 1993.
- Effie O'Neal Ellis in 1970 became the first African American woman to work as an administrator at the American Medical Association.
- Josephine English was an American gynecologist who was the first African-American woman to open a private practice in New York.
- Anna Cherrie Epps in 1969 became the first African American woman to work as a professor at the Tulane University School of Medicine.
- Roselyln P. Epps worked as a professor of pediatrics and child health at Howard University, starting in 1981.
- Doris A. Evans was one of the first two African-American women to graduate from Case Western Reserve University School of Medicine in 1968 (the other was Lorna K. Brown)
- Lydia Ashburne Evans was an early African American physician who worked in Chicago.

F

- Dorothy Celeste Boulding Ferebee was a physician and civil rights activist.
- Angelina Dorothea Ferguson, pediatrician and the first associate vice-president for health affairs at Howard University. She was also known for her work with sickle cell anemia.
- Vernice Ferguson in 1981 was elected president of the American Academy of Nursing.
- Ella Mae Ferneil was the first African American registered nurse in the state of California.
- Ada Fisher in 1975 was the first African-American woman to earn a Doctor of Medicine (MD) degree from the University of Wisconsin.
- Kathryn Haley Flangin was the first African-American woman to earn a Doctor of Medicine (MD) degree from the University of Texas Southwestern Medical Center at Dallas, Texas.
- Loma K. Flowers in 1968 was one of the first two women to earn a Doctor of Medicine (MD) degree from Case Western Reserve University School of Medicine. (The other was Doris A. Evans.)
- Debra Holly Ford became the first African American woman certified in colon and rectal surgery in 1996.
- Justina Laurena Carter Ford in 1902 became the first African American woman to earn a medical license in Colorado.
- Janice Marie Fox was one of the first two African-American women to earn a Doctor of Medicine (MD) degree from the Michigan State University College of Human Medicine. (The other was Judith Ann Ingram.)
- Yvette Fay Francis-McBarnette graduated from Yale School of Medicine in 1950 and was the second African American woman admitted to the school.
- Dolores Mercedes Franklin in 1974 became the first African American woman to graduate from the Harvard School of Dental Medicine.
- Johnnie Paris Frazier in 1976 was one of the first two African-American women (and one African-American man) to earn a Doctor of Medicine (MD) degree from Texas Tech University Health Sciences Center School of Medicine. The other two were Stella Pinkney Jones and Charles Edward Mathis, III.)
- Melissa Freeman was a physician based at the Beth Israel Medical Center. She developed the use of methadone to treat heroin addiction, ran a methadone maintenance program in New York, and mentored young doctors.
- Clara Frye was a nurse and inventor who received a patent for a combination bed and bedpan in 1907.

G

- Vanessa Northington Gamble is a physician who chaired the Tuskegee Syphilis Study Legacy Committee in 1996.
- Isabella Garnett and her husband, Arthur Butler, founded the first hospital in the city of Evanston, Illinois that would serve African-American patients.
- Jessie G. Garnett in 1919 became the first woman to graduate from Tufts Dental School.
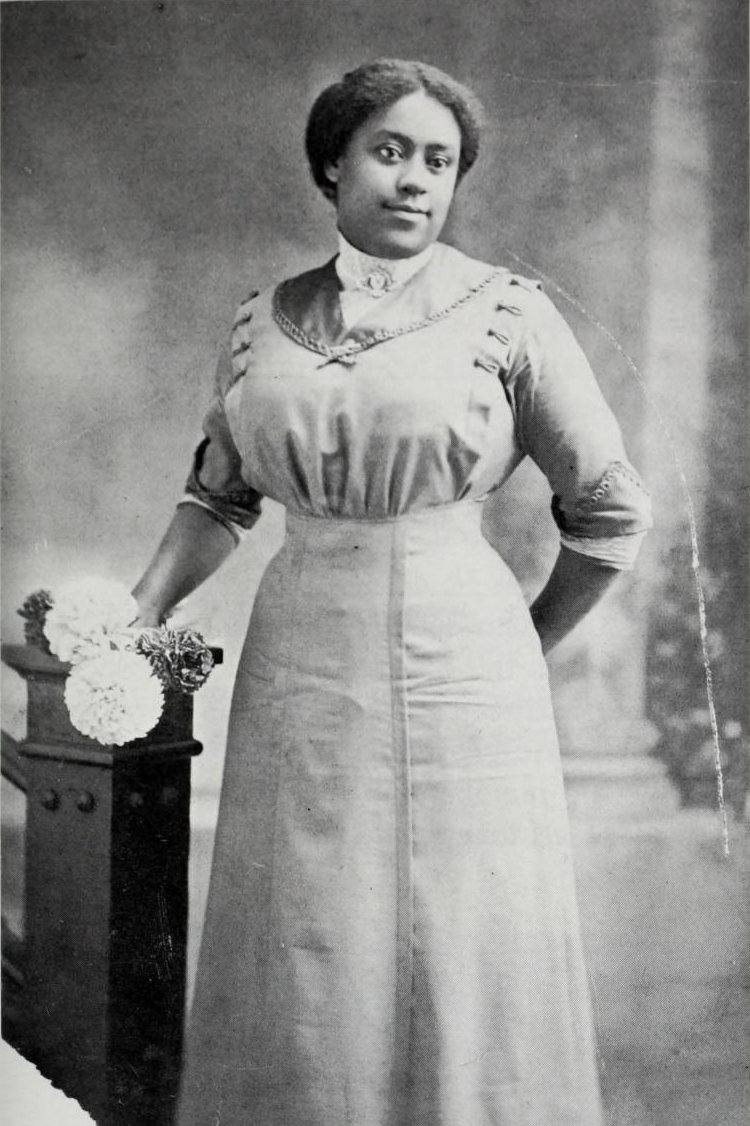
  Jessie Gideon Garnett (1897–1976)
- Fannie Gaston-Johansson in 1998 earned full professorship and tenure at Johns Hopkins School of Nursing, the first African American woman to earn that position.
- Marilyn Hughes Gaston, in 1990 becomes the first Black woman doctor appointed director of the Health Resources and Services Administration's Bureau of Primary Health Care.
- Wilina Gatson in 1960 became the first African American graduate of the University of Texas Medical Branch (UTMB) at Galveston earning a Bachelor of Science degree from their nursing program.
- Hughenna L. Gauntlett in 1951 was the first African-American woman to earn a degree from Loma Linda University School of Medicine and in 1968 became the first African-American woman to be certified by the American Board of Surgery (ABS).
- Helene Doris Gayle, in 1995 becomes the first woman and African-American appointed as director of the National Center for HIV, STD, and TB Prevention at the US CDC.
- Florence S. Gaynor became the first African American woman to "head a major teaching hospital" in 1971.
- Catherine Alicia Georges is a registered nurse, professor, and nonprofit executive and has been recognized as a Living Legend by the American Academy of Nursing.
- Mary Keys Gibson in 1907 became the first African American in the Southern United States to earn a nursing certificate.
- Zenobia Gilpin in 1934 was the first African-American woman doctor on the staff of Children's Memorial Clinic in Richmond, Virginia.
- Carol Coleman Gray was the first African-American woman to earn a Doctor of Medicine (MD) degree from the University of Texas Medical School at San Antonio.
- Deborah Green was one of the first two African-American women to earn a Doctor of Medicine (MD) degree from the University of Colorado School of Medicine. (The other was LaRae H. Washington.)
- Margaret E. Grigsby was the first African-American woman to become a fellow of the American College of Physicians and the first woman to preside over a major medical division at Howard University Hospital.
- Alyce Chenault Gullattee was a psychiatrist, medical school professor, activist, and expert on addiction. She was a faculty member in the psychiatry department at Howard University College of Medicine for over fifty years.
- Lucille C. Gunning was an African-American pediatrician and medical services administrator who became a specialist in the treatment of children's cancer and the director of pediatric rehabilitation at Harlem Hospital.

H

- Mamie Odessa Hale was nurse and teacher of midwives in Arkansas.
- Millie E. Hale in 1916 founded Millie E. Hale Hospital with her husband, John Henry Hale, M.D., in Nashville, Tennessee, the first year-round hospital for African Americans in the city.
- Beatrix McCleary Hamburg in 1948 became the first African American woman to graduate from the Yale School of Medicine.
- Jean L. Harris in 1955 is the first African American woman to earn a medical degree from the Medical College of Virginia.
- Maxine Hayes is an American public health expert who was the State Health Officer for Washington state from 1998 until 2013.
- Eve Higginbotham in 1994 became the first African American woman chair of a department of ophthalmology in a university. (University of Maryland School of Medicine in Baltimore)
- Jane Hinton in 1949 is one of the first of two African American women to become a doctor of veterinary medicine.
- Lillian Holland Harvey was the dean of the Tuskegee University School of Nursing for 30 years.
- Sandra Cavanaugh Holley in 1988 became the first African American president of the American Speech–Language–Hearing Association.
- Laura Holloway Yergan was a public health nurse and nursing educator who often worked internationally, in Africa, the Middle East, Asia, and the Caribbean.
- Carol Jean Hubbard in 1982 was the first African-American woman to earn a Doctor of Medicine (MD) degree from Wright State University School of Medicine.
- Alberta Hunter earned her practical nurse's license at age 62 in 1957 and worked at the New York City Roosevelt Island Goldwater Memorial Hospital for 20 years as a nurse.
- Gertrude Cora Teixeria Hunter was the first director for Health Services for Head Start.
- M. Deborrah Hyde in 1982 was the first female and African American to complete a neurosurgery residency at Case Western University. Hyde is also the second African-American woman certified by the American Board of Neurological Surgery.

I

- Judith Ann Ingram was one of the first two African-American women to earn a Doctor of Medicine (MD) degree from the Michigan State University College of Human Medicine. (The other was Janice Marie Fox.)
- Eleanor Lutia Ison-Franklin was the first African American woman to earn a position as a "major administrative officer" at Howard University School of Medicine.

J

- Alma N. Jackson in 1945 became the first African American woman commissioned as a nurse for the United States Public Health Service.
- Anna Louise James, in 1908 was the first Black woman to become licensed as a pharmacist in Connecticut.
- Grace Marilynn James, in 1953 became one of two of the first African American women to serve on the faculty of a medical school in the American South.
- Tyshawn M. James in 1989 became the first African American to earn a Doctor of Medicine (MD) degree from Marshall University School of Medicine (West Virginia).
- Mildred Faye Jefferson in 1951 became the first African American woman to earn a medical degree from Harvard Medical School.
- Mae C. Jemison, first African-American woman astronaut, is also a physician.
- Patricia Ann Jenkins in 1973 was one of the first two African-American women to earn a Doctor of Medicine (MD) from Johns Hopkins University School of Medicine. (The other was Edwina Margaret Barnett.)
- Renee Rosalind Jenkins in 1989 became the first African American president of the Society for Adolescent Medicine and in 2007, became the first African American president of the American Academy of Pediatrics.
- Eddie Bernice Johnson in 1992 became the first registered nurse in the United States Congress
- Gladys L. Johnson in 1982 became the first African American woman oral and maxillofacial surgeon.
- Linda Dianne Johnson in 1978 became the first African American woman optometrist in Mississippi.
- Hazel W. Johnson-Brown in 1979 became the first African American chief of the Army Nurse Corps.
- Mattiedna Johnson played a role in curing scarlet fever in the 1940s.
- Edith Irby Jones in 1948 became the first African-American student to attend the University of Arkansas School of Medicine (now the University of Arkansas for Medical Sciences) and in 1985 became the first woman to be elected as president of the National Medical Association.
- Janis Adelaide Jones in 1978 was one of the first two African-American women to earn a Doctor of Medicine (MD) degree from Vanderbilt University. (The other was Darlene Dailey.)
- Marjorie Earline Jones in 1960 was one of the first three African Americans, and the first African-American woman, to earn a Doctor of Medicine degree from the University of Medicine and Dentistry of New Jersey/New Jersey Medical School. (The others were Albert Paul Knott and David Roland Snead.)
- Stella Pinkney Jones in 1976 was one of the first two African-American women (and one African-American man) to earn a Doctor of Medicine (MD) degree from Texas Tech University Health Sciences Center School of Medicine. The other two were Johnnie Paris Frazier and Charles Edward Mathis, III.)
- Vernette Jones Bee in 1978 was one of the first two African-American women to earn a Doctor of Medicine (MD) degree from the University of Massachusetts Medical School. (The other was Marcia Clair Bowling.)

K

- Elizabeth Lipford Kent in 1955 became the first African American nurse to earn a doctorate in public health.
- Brenda Mills Klutz in 1981 was one of the first two African Americans to earn a Doctor of Medicine (MD) degree from the East Carolina University School of Medicine. (The other was Natalear R. Collins.)
- Francis M. Kneeland established her own practice as a physician in Memphis, Tennessee in 1907.

L

- Henrietta Lacks, in 1951 was diagnosed with terminal cervical cancer, and whose cancer cells were cultivated without her or her family's knowledge or consent, are the source of the HeLa cell line, the first immortalized human cell line.
- Janice C. Lark in 1975 was one of the first two African-American women to earn a Doctor of Medicine (MD) degree from the University of New York at Stonybrook. (The other is Mitchelene J. Morgan.)
- Nella Larsen worked as a nurse in New York City and for a year at the Tuskegee Institute while in her 20s. Following a divorce and in need of income, Larsen resumed her nursing career and worked for 20 years at various Manhattan hospitals.
- Agnes D. Lattimer, pediatrician, did her residency at Cook County Hospital in 1960. In 1986, Lattimer was appointed as the medical director of Cook County Hospital, making her the first African-American woman medical director of a major hospital.
- Margaret Morgan Lawrence was the first African-American woman to become a psychiatrist and psychoanalyst in the United States
- Jemima Belle Lawson in 1920 became the first African American to earn the title of registered nurse in Bell County, Texas.
- Catharine Deaver Lealtad in 1915 became the first African American to graduate from Macalester College, and gained her medical qualification from the University of Paris. She specialized in pediatrics and undertook humanitarian work.
- Nancy Leftenant-Colon in March 1948 became the first African American in the Regular Army Nurse Corps.
- Vivian M. Lewis in 1959 became the first African American woman to earn a medical degree from the University of Oklahoma College of Medicine.
- Diane Lindsay who served in the Army Nurse Corps became the first African American nurse to earn the Soldier's Medal for Heroism.
- Ruth Smith Lloyd was the first African American woman to earn a doctorate in anatomy.
- Myra Adele Logan in 1943 was the first woman to perform open-heart surgery.
- Marie B. Lucas was a physician and one of the earliest women to practice medicine in Washington, D.C.
- Hulda Margaret Lyttle was the first African American to pass the State of Tennessee's nursing license exam.

M

- Audrey Forbes Manley, in 1988, became the first African American woman to become the assistant surgeon general of the U.S.
- Shirley F. Marks is an American psychiatrist. She was the second African-American woman to graduate from Harvard Medical School.
- Ethel Maynard was a politician, activist, and registered nurse who served in the Arizona House of Representatives as a member of the Democratic Party. She was the first Black woman to serve in the Arizona Legislature.
- Barbara Martin McArthur in 1976 created the first nurse epidemiology program in the US.
- Pearl McBroom developed new ways of observing changes in coronary blood vessel tissue.
- Ernest Mae McCarroll in 1946 became the first Black physician to work at the Newark City Hospital.
- Catherine Mae McKee McCottry was the first African-American woman physician in Charlotte, North Carolina, and the first African-American woman obstetrician and gynecologist in Charleston, South Carolina.
- Deborah Lynne McCullough in 1975 became one of the first two African-American women to earn a doctor of medicine degree from Indiana University School of Medicine (The other was Beverly J. Perkins)
- Janice C. McIntosh in 1974 was the first African-American woman to earn a Doctor of Medicine (MD) degree from Pennsylvania State University College of Medicine. (At the same time, four African-American men earned their M.D. degrees.)
- Gertrude Elizabeth Curtis McPherson in 1904 became the first Black woman to pass the New York State Board of Dentistry.
- Mary E. Merritt became the first African-American licensed nurse in Kentucky.
- Marie Metoyer in 1951 became the first African American woman to graduate as a medical doctor from Cornell University.
- Edith Mitchell was a retired Brigadier general of the United States Air Force and an oncologist. She was clinical professor of medicine and medical oncology at Thomas Jefferson University.
- Jane Evelyn Mitchell, one of the first African American registered nurses in Delaware.
- Janet L. Mitchell was an American physician known for her advances in perinatal HIV/AIDS treatment.
- Mildred Mitchell-Bateman in 1962 became the first woman to head a state department of mental health. (West Virginia)
- Agnes Craig Montier in 1912 became the first African-American woman to graduate from Temple University medical school (earning a doctor of medicine (M.D.) degree).
- Mitchelene J. Morgan in 1975 was one of the first two African-American women to earn a Doctor of Medicine (MD) degree from the University of New York at Stonybrook. (The other is Janice C. Lark.)

N

- Helen E. Nash in 1949 was the first African-American woman to join the medical staff at Washington University School of Medicine, and the first African-American woman to join the staff of St. Louis Children's Hospital. Nash helped integrate St. Louis Children's Hospital and worked on reducing infant mortality.
- Joyce Nichols became the first woman educated formally as a Physician Assistant in 1970.
- Eva M. Noles in 1940 became the first African American person to graduate from the E.J. Meyer Memorial Hospital School of Nursing.
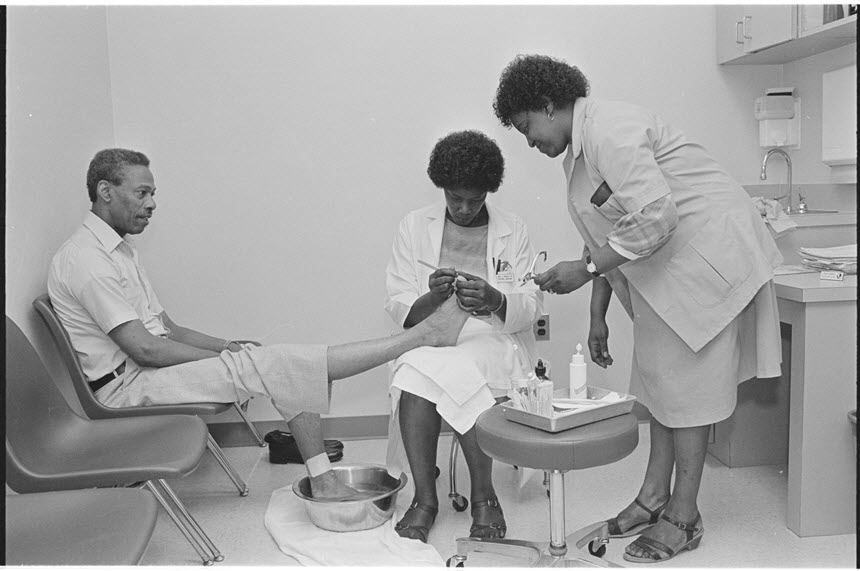
  Joyce Nichols, center, and Shirley Thompson, right, treat Raymond Hayes in 1983.

O

- Estelle Massey Osborne was the first African American to earn her master's degree in nursing.
- Lucy Oxley was the first African American to earn a Doctor of Medicine from the University of Cincinnati College of Medicine.

P

- Doreen P. Palmer was the first woman to head the gastroenterology department in a hospital.
- Thelma Patten Law in 1955 was the first African American woman to enter the Harris County Medical Society.
- Margaret M. Patterson-Townsend in 1992 opened the first successful sleep disorder clinic owned and operated by an African American woman.
- Yvonne A. Patterson in 1983 was one of the first African Americans to earn a Doctor of Medicine (MD) degree from Northeastern Ohio University College of Medicine. (The others were Margo Shamberger, Rochelle A. Broome, and John D. Lewis.)
- Sarah Ewell Payton in 1962 became the first African American woman certified by the American Board of Radiology.
- Helen Majorie Peebles-Meyers in 1943 was the first African-American woman to earn an M.D. degree from Wayne State University School of Medicine
- Rose Marie Pegues-Perkins was one of the first African American x-ray technicians.
- Diane Loren Pemberton in 1975 was one of the first two African-American women to earn a Doctor of Medicine (MD) degree from the University of California at Davis School of Medicine. (The other was Sandra Dian Battis.)
- Audrey S. Penn was elected President of the American Neurological Association in 1994 and was the first African-American woman to serve as an (acting) director of an Institute of the National Institutes of Health (NIH).
- Lucille Norville Perez is an American physician known for her work in substance abuse and HIV/AIDS prevention.
- Beverly J. Perkins in 1975 became one of the first two African-American women to earn a doctor of medicine degree from Indiana University School of Medicine (The other was Deborah Lynne McCullough)
- Muriel Petioni in 1974 founded the Susan Smith McKinney Steward Medical Society for Women, professional organization for African American doctors.
- Petra Pinn in 1923 was elected president of the National Association of Colored Graduate Nurses (NACGN).
- Vivian Pinn in 1991 became the first woman appointed the director of the office of research on women's health at the National Institutes of Health.
- Elinor Powell was a World War II nurse working for the Army who defied anti-miscegenation laws.
- Inez Prosser in 1933 became the first African American woman to earn a doctorate in psychology.
- Deborah Prothrow-Stith in 1987 became the youngest person and the first woman to serve as the commissioner of public health in Massachusetts.

R

- Della H. Raney became the first African American nurse in the Army Nurse Corps when she was accepted in 1941.
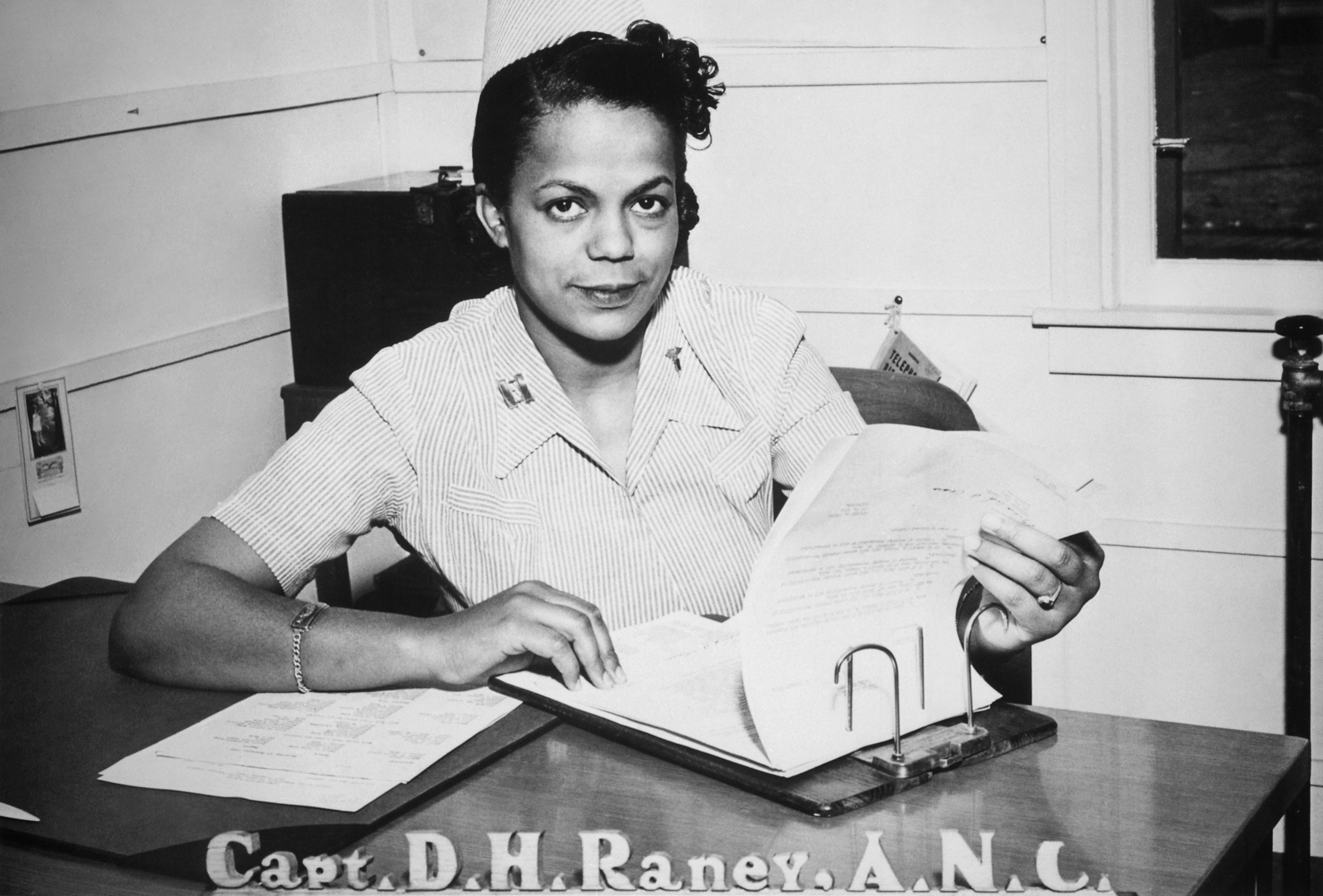
  Della H. Raney, of the Army Nurse Corps
- Rosalie A. Reed in 1973 became the first Black veterinarian to work at a major zoo in the United States.
- Theresa Greene Reed in 1968 became the first African American woman to work as an epidemiologist.
- Clarice Reid is an American pediatrician born in Birmingham, Alabama, who led the National Sickle Cell Disease Program at the U.S. National Heart, Lung, and Blood Institute (NHLBI) at the National Institutes of Health.
- Estelle B. Richman in 1995 became the first African American woman to serve as Health Commissioner in Philadelphia.
- Catherine Juanita Elizabeth Roett-Reid in 1951 became the first African American pediatrician in Houston, Texas.
- Barbara Ross-Lee in 1993 became the first African-American woman appointed dean of a medical school in the United States.
- Mary Munson Runge in 1979 became the first African American to serve as the head of the American Pharmaceutical Association.

S

- Patricia Ann Sanders was one of the first two African Americans and the first African-American woman to earn a Doctor of Medicine (MD) degree from the University of Southern Alabama School of Medicine. (The other was John Henry Wagner III.)
- Jessie Sleet Scales became the first African American public health nurse in 1900 when she was appointed to the Tuberculosis Committee of the Charity Organization Society in New York.
- Velma Scantleburry-White is the first African-American female transplant surgeon in the United States
- Rosalyn P. Scott in 1977 became the first African American woman trained in the practice of thoracic surgery.
- Joan R. Sealy in 1968 became the first African-American woman to earn a Doctor of Medicine from George Washington University School of Medicine and Health Sciences
- Florence Battle Shafig in 1976 became the first African-American woman to earn a Doctor of Medicine from the University of Iowa College of Medicine.
- Margo Shamberger in 1983 was one of the first African Americans to earn a Doctor of Medicine (MD) degree from Northeastern Ohio University College of Medicine. (The others were Yvonne A. Patterson, Rochelle A. Broome, and John D. Lewis.)
- Doris Shockley in 1955 became the first African American woman to earn a doctorate in pharmacology.
- Omega Logan Silva in 1974 became the first African American person to work at the Department of Veterans Affairs as a Clinical Investigator.
- Ellamae Simmons was the first African-American woman medical doctor in the United States to specialize in immunology.
- Angelica Valencia Sims in 1975 was one of the first two African-American women to earn a Doctor of Medicine (MD) degree from the Medical College of Georgia. (The other was Elizabeth Hawkins Woods.)
- Jeanne Craig Sinkford in 1975 becomes the first woman to serve as the dean of a school of dentistry.
- Gayle Smith-Blair in 1987 became the first African-American woman to earn a Doctor of Medicine degree from the Texas A&M School of Medicine
- Gloria R. Smith in 1983 became the first nurse appointed to the head of a state agency in Michigan.
- Margaret Charles Smith was a midwife in Alabama, who became known for her extraordinary skill over a long career, spanning over thirty years.
- Vada Watson Somerville in 1918 became the first African American woman to earn a Doctorate of Dental Surgery in California.
- Jeanne Spurlock in 1971 became the first woman to receive the Edward A. Strecker M.D. Award.
- Mabel Keaton Staupers worked to desegregate the nursing profession.
- Rosalyn Sterling in 1986 became the first African-American woman certified by the American Board of Thoracic Surgery
- Ella P. Stewart in 1916 became the first Black woman licensed as a pharmacist in both Pennsylvania and in the United States.
- Hilda G. Straker in 1950 was the first African-American woman certified by the American Board of Dermatology and Syphilology (name changed in 1955 to American Board of Dermatology.
- Florence Stroud became the first African American health directory for Berkeley University.
- Virginia Elizabeth Stull in 1966 was the first African-American woman to earn a Doctor of Medicine from the University of Texas Medical School at Galveston
- Louise Nixon Sutton in 1962 became the first African-American woman to earn a Ph.D. degree in mathematics education from New York University
- 2nd Lt. Nurse Abbie Sweetwine of 494th Medical Group of the United States Air Force ran triage at the 1952 Harrow and Wealdstone rail crash based on her military field experience. The success of the team's response is credited with inspiring the development of the use of paramedics in Britain.

T

- Natalia Tanner in 1946 became the first African American to do their residency at the University of Chicago.
- Ruth Janetta Temple, a physician, worked in public health in Los Angeles.
- Claudia L. Thomas is the first female orthopedic surgeon in the United States
- Debi Thomas in 1988 won an Olympic bronze medal for figure skating and in 1997, graduated from medical school.
- Adah Belle Samuel Thoms earned her nursing degree in 1905 at the Lincoln Hospital and Home School of Nursing and went on to advocate for better opportunities for black nurses.
- Yvonne Thornton in 1981 became the first African-American woman to become board certified in special competency in maternal-fetal medicine.
- Deborah Ann Turner in 1985 became the first African-American certified by the American Board of Obstetrics and Gynecology in the specialty of gynecologic oncology.

V

- Isabella Vandervall was an African-American physician, gynecologist and a prominent advocate for the birth control movement in New York City.
- Lola N. Vassall worked as a civilian physician at United States Army hospitals in Vienna, Washington, D.C., Monterey, California, and finally at Letterman Army Hospital in San Francisco, California.
- Yvonnecris Veal in 1989 became the first woman chair on the Board of Trustees for the National Medical Association.

W

- Valerie O. Walker in 1994 became the first African American woman to serve on the Missouri Board of Registration for the Healing Arts.
- Mary Fitzbutler Waring, a physician and clubwoman, served as the chair of the Department of Health and Hygiene for the National Association of Colored Women's Clubs (NACW).
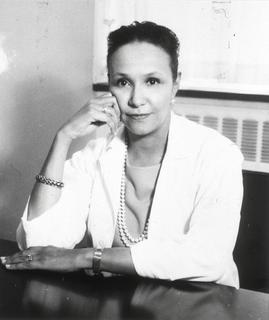
  Jane Cooke Wright
- LaRae H. Washington was one of the first two African-American women to earn a Doctor of Medicine (MD) degree from the University of Colorado School of Medicine. (The other was Deborah Green.)
- Alyce Faye Wattleton in 1978 became the first African American to serve as president of the Planned Parenthood Federation of America.
- Alfreda Johnson Webb in 1949 became one of the first of two African American women to earn a doctor of veterinary medicine.
- Josie E. Wells in 1910 became the first African American woman teaching at Meharry Medical College.
- Frances Cress Welsing, psychiatrist who studied racism.
- Doris Wethers, who graduated from Yale School of Medicine in 1952, was the third African-American woman to graduate from the school. In 1958 Wethers was the first African-American attending physician at St Luke's Hospital, in New York City.
- Emma Rochelle Wheeler, graduated from Meharry Medical College in 1905 and helped create Walden Hospital.
- Ionia Rollin Whipper, graduated from Howard University Medical School in 1903 and in 1931, created the Ionia R. Whipper Home for Unwed Mothers.
- Betty Smith Williams in 1954 became the first African-American nurse to graduate from the nursing school at Case Western Reserve University; in 1971 co-founded the National Black Nurses Association
- Elizabeth Hawkins Woods in 1975 was one of the first two African-American women to earn a Doctor of Medicine (MD) degree from the Medical College of Georgia. (The other was Angelica Valencia Sims.)
- Geraldine Pittman Woods, in 1964 became the first African-American woman appointed to the National Advisory General Medical Services Council.
- Minnie D. Woodward in 1913 was the first African American to earn a certificate of registration as a trained nurse in Tennessee.
- Jane C. Wright, in 1967 became the associate dean and professor of surgery at New York Medical College.

Y

- Joyce Yerwood in 1955 was the first female African-American physician in Fairfield County, Connecticut, and founder of the Yerwood Center, the first community center for African Americans in Stamford, Connecticut
- N. Louise Young was the first African American woman practicing medicine in Maryland, beginning in 1933.
- Terri Young is an American pediatric ophthalmologist.

Z

- Josefa Zaratt in 1905 was one of the first African-American women to graduate from Tufts Medical School.

== 2000s ==
A

- Ije Akunyili in 2023 became the first African American woman chief medical officer at Jersey City Medical Center.
- Michelle Albert is a cardiologist who is the Walter A. Haas Lucie-Stern Endowed Chair in Cardiology and professor of medicine at the University of California, San Francisco. Albert is a past president of the American Heart Association, the Association of Black Cardiologists and of the Association of University Cardiologists. She is an elected member of the National Academy of Medicine, the American Society of Clinical Investigators and the Association of American Physicians.
- Adejoke Ayoola is a Nigerian-American academic and nursing researcher at Calvin University.

B

- Wanda Barfield in 2025 is the Director of the Division of Reproductive Health (DRH) within the National Center for Chronic Disease Prevention and Health Promotion (NCCDPHP) at the Centers for Disease Control and Prevention (CDC).
- Linda Bell is the South Carolina state epidemiologist with the Department of Public Health.
- Regina Marcia Benjamin, 18th United States Surgeon General, appointed in 2009.
- Marie Bernard was the Chief Officer for Scientific Workforce Diversity at the National Institutes of Health (NIH): Marie Bernard
- Uché Blackstock is an emergency physician and former associate professor of emergency medicine at the New York University School of Medicine.
- Carolyn Barley Britton in 2008 became the first neurologist president of the National Medical Association. Britton is known for her national health care advocacy and work in neurological complications of HIV and infectious diseases.
- U. Diane Buckingham is a psychiatrist known for her development of culturally sensitive diagnosis and treatment of mental illness in children and adolescents.
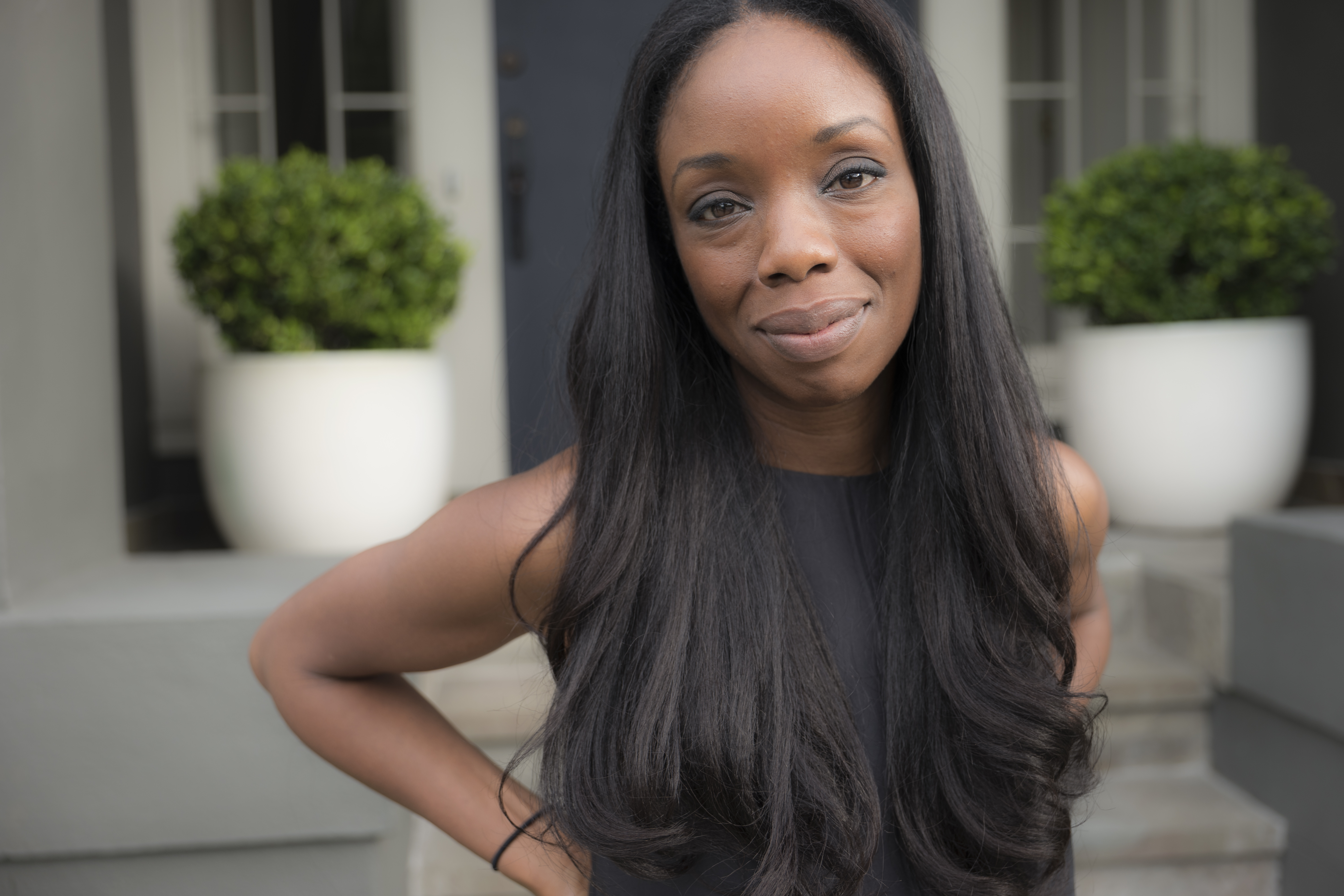
- Nadine Burke Harris, first Surgeon General for California
  Nadine Burke Harris becomes the first Surgeon General of the State of California in 2019.

C

- Judith Martin Cadore is a U.S. family practitioner who serves rural populations prone to health care disparities in the Bay City, Texas area.
- Virginia Caine is the director and chief medical officer of the Marion County Public Health Department in Indianapolis, Indiana and in 2024, the National Medical Association installed Virginia Caine as its 125th president.
- Rotonya M. Carr is a hepatologist and physician-scientist who studies the function of lipid metabolites and lipid droplet proteins in relation to hepatic insulin signaling. She is the Cyrus E. Rubin Chair and division head of gastroenterology at the University of Washington.
- Camille A. Clare is an obstetrician and gynecologist. Clare is the Chair of the Department of Obstetrics and Gynecology at SUNY Downstate Medical Center and Professor at the College of Medicine and the School of Public Health.
- Janine Austin Clayton is an ophthalmologist and the National Institutes of Health (NIH) associate director for research on women's health and director of the Office of Women's Health.
- Tracie C. Collins is an academic, physician, and government official serving as the Secretary of Health of New Mexico.
- Kizzmekia Corbett is a viral immunologist. Corbett is an Assistant Professor of Immunology and Infectious Diseases at Harvard T.H. Chan School of Public Health and the Shutzer Assistant Professor at the Harvard Radcliffe Institute.
- Giselle Corbie-Smith is a Kenan Distinguished Professor of Social Medicine at the University of North Carolina School of Medicine. She serves as Director of the UNC Center for Health Equity Research and Associate Provost of the Institute of Rural Innovation.
- Deidra Crews is a nephrologist and epidemiologist. Crews is the Deputy Director of Johns Hopkins Center for Health Equity, Associate Director for Faculty Development, Division of Nephrology, and a Professor of Medicine at Johns Hopkins School of Medicine.
- Ethelene Crockett was Michigan's first African-American woman board certified OB/GYN, and the first woman president of the American Lung Association.

D

- Andrea Dalzell is a nurse and disability rights activist who is the first wheelchair-using registered nurse in the state of New York.
- Jessica Henderson Daniel in 2018 became the first African-American president elected to the American Psychological Association.
- Deborah V. Deas is a psychiatrist and academic administrator serving as the dean of the UC Riverside School of Medicine since 2016.
- Letitia Dzirasa in 2019 became the first African-American woman commissioner of the Baltimore City Health Department.

E

- Shekinah Elmore was an assistant professor in the department of radiation oncology at the University of North Carolina School of Medicine.
- Ihuoma Emenuga is an internist and public health physician who served as the commissioner of the Baltimore City Health Department from January to July 2024.
- Roselyn Payne Epps in 2002 became the first African American woman president of the American Medical Women's Association.
- Michele K. Evans is an internist and medical oncologist. She is a senior investigator and Deputy Scientific Director at the National Institute on Aging (NIH).
- Ngozi Ezike was the first African-American woman director of the Illinois Department of Public Health (IDPH) and in 2022, she was appointed CEO and President of the Sinai Chicago hospital system.

F

- Icilma V. Fergus in 2014 became President of the Association of Black Cardiologists (ABC)
- Courtney Fitzhugh is a hematologist-oncologist and scientist. She is a clinical researcher and head of the laboratory of early sickle cell mortality prevention at the National Heart, Lung, and Blood Institute.
- Gwendolyn A. Foster, first Black female on active duty to become a general officer in the United States Air Force Medical Service.
- Mindy Thompson Fullilove is a social psychiatrist who focuses on the ways social and environmental factors affect the mental health of communities. She is currently a professor of Urban Policy and Health at The New School.

G

- Safiya George is a U.S. Virgin Islands nurse practitioner and academic administrator specialized in holistic health, spirituality, and HIV. She is the president of the University of the Virgin Islands.
- Melissa L. Gilliam is a pediatric and adolescent gynecologist. In 2021 Gilliam became the first woman of color to serve as provost of Ohio State University and in 2024 became the 11th president of Boston University.
- Sherita Hill Golden is a physician-scientist who is the Hugh P. McCormick Family Professor of Endocrinology and Metabolism at Johns Hopkins University.
- Anjelica Gonzalez in 2022 was appointed head of Davenport College, making her the first Black woman to serve as head of college in Yale University's history.
- Wallena Gould in 2015 became the first African American Certified Registered Nurse Anesthetist (CRNA) to become a fellow in the American Academy of Nursing (AAN).
- Carmen Renée Green is an anesthesiologist, pain medicine physician, and academic administrator. In 2021, she became the second dean of the CUNY School of Medicine.
- Vanessa Grubbs is a nephrologist and a writer based in Oakland, California. Grubbs is an associate professor at the University of California, San Francisco and works at Zuckerberg San Francisco General Hospital.

H

- Odette Harris in 2018 became the first African-American woman appointed Professor of Neurosurgery at Stanford University.
- Patrice Harris in 2018 became the first African-American president elected to the American Medical Association.
- Rebecca Hasson is an Associate Professor of Kinesiology at the University of Michigan. She researches the causes and consequences of pediatric obesity and how the environment impacts obesity related metabolic risk factors to inform health policies.
- Andrea Hayes-Jordan was the first pediatric surgeon to perform a high-risk, life-saving procedure in children with a rare form of cancer and developed the first orthotropic xenograft model of metastatic Ewing's sarcoma. In 2002, she became the first African-American female pediatric surgeon board-certified in the United States. She is the Chairwoman of Surgery at Howard University Hospital.
- Michelle F. Henry is an African-American dermatologist, dermatologic surgeon, and clinical educator. She is the founder of Skin & Aesthetic Surgery of Manhattan and a clinical instructor of dermatology at Weill Cornell Medical College.
- Sharon Henry in 2000 became the first African-American woman to become a fellow in the American Association for the Surgery of Trauma.
- Ebony Jade Hilton in 2013 became the first African-American woman anesthesiologist to be hired at the Medical University of South Carolina (MUSC)

J

- Thea L. James is the Associate Professor, Associate Chief Medical Officer, and Vice President of the Mission at the Boston Medical Center.
- Michele Johnson, became the first woman and African American promoted to a full professorship of Radiology and Biomedical Imaging and of Neurosurgery at the Yale School of Medicine in 2014.
- Paula A. Johnson is the first African-American president of Wellesley College, chairwoman of the Boston Public Health Commission, former professor at the Harvard T.H. Chan School of Public Health.
- Kathie-Ann Joseph is Chief of Breast Surgery and Co-Director of the Breast Oncology Program, Rutgers Cancer Institute of New Jersey and Jack & Sheryl Morris Cancer Center.

L

- Risa Lavizzo-Mourey is an American medical doctor and executive who served as president and CEO of the Robert Wood Johnson Foundation from 2003 to 2017.
- Irene D. Long in 2000 was appointed as the first female chief medical officer at the Kennedy Space Center

M

- Veronica Mallett is a health physician. She is known for her work in urogynecology, specifically with respect to genital organ prolapse and urinary incontinence, and for her efforts in reducing health disparities.
- Kameron Leigh Matthews is a physician who is the Chief Health Officer of Cityblock Health effective January 2022, a value-based healthcare provider for Medicaid and lower-income Medicare beneficiaries.
- Celia Maxwell is an infectious disease physician and academic administrator. She is the co-director of clinical trials and the clinical trials unit at the Howard University College of Medicine.
- Aletha Maybank was the chief health equity officer of the American Medical Association for five years, until stepping down at the end of 2024.
- Worta McCaskill-Stevens was a physician-scientist and medical oncologist who specialized in cancer disparities research, management of comorbidities within clinical trials, and molecular research for cancer prevention interventions.
- Monica McLemore is a nurse who is an associate professor of Family Health Nursing at the University of California, San Francisco.
- Juanita Merchant is an American gastroenterologist and physiology researcher who has contributed to understanding of gastric response to chronic inflammation.
- Jennifer Mieres is a cardiologist who wrote Heart Smart for Black Women and Latinas. Mieres is the Associate Dean of Faculty Affairs and a professor of cardiology, at The Zucker School of Medicine.
- Michelle E. Morse is an internist, an assistant professor at Harvard Medical School/Brigham and Women's Hospital and co-founded EqualHealth and Social Medicine Consortium. She is currently the interim Commissioner of Health for the City of New York.

N

- Renee Chapman Navarro, PharmD, MD became the first African-American woman vice chancellor and the inaugural vice chancellor of the Office of Diversity and Outreach at the University of California, San Francisco.
- LaQuandra S. Nesbitt is a family physician who in 2022 joined the George Washington University School of Medicine & Health Sciences (SMHS) as the executive director of the Center for Population Health Sciences and Health Equity.
- Evelyn Nicol was an immunologist and microbiologist. Nicol was the first scientist to isolate the herpes zoster virus, and is one of the few African-American women to receive a patent in molecular biology, for a new production method of urokinase.
- Ogonna Nnamani is a physician and a resident in plastic and reconstructive surgery at Harvard Medical School

O

- Elizabeth O. Ofili in 2000 became the first woman to serve as president of the Association of Black Cardiologists.
- Bisola Ojikutu is a physician, infectious disease specialist, public health leader and health equity researcher. In July 2021, she was appointed as the Executive Director of the Boston Public Health Commission.
- Adeiyewunmi Osinubi is a physician, documentary filmmaker, and writer. Osinubi is also an emergency medicine resident physician at the University of Pennsylvania School of Medicine.

P

- Monica E. Peek is a physician and the Ellen H. Block Professor for Health Justice and Associate Vice Chair for Research Faculty Development at the University of Chicago's Pritzker School of Medicine.
- Lori J. Pierce in 2020 became the first African-American woman to be the President of the American Society of Clinical Oncology (ASCO)
- Tina Young Poussaint is a professor of radiology at the Harvard Medical School and a Neuroradiologist at the Boston Children's Hospital. In 2010 she served as president of the American Society of Pediatric Neuroradiology.

R

- Joan Reede became the first dean for diversity and community partnership at Harvard Medical School in 2001.
- Valerie Montgomery Rice, in 2014 became the president of the Morehouse School of Medicine, the first woman to hold the position.
- Lynne D. Richardson is an emergency physician and health services researcher. She is a professor at Icahn School of Medicine at Mount Sinai and a member of the National Academy of Medicine.

S

- Adrienne Williams Scott is an ophthalmologist specialized in diabetic retinopathy, epiretinal membranes, and macular degeneration. She is chief of the Wilmer Eye Institute in Bel Air, Harford County, Maryland. She is an associate professor of ophthalmology at Johns Hopkins School of Medicine.
- Jeannette E. South-Paul in 2001 became the first African American to serve as permanent department chair at the University of Pittsburgh department of family medicine.
- Ala Stanford is a pediatric surgeon. She is the founder of R.E.A.L. Concierge Medicine and the Black Doctors COVID-19 Consortium. Stanford is also the first African-American woman pediatric surgeon to be trained entirely in the United States.
- Altha Stewart is a psychiatrist. In 2015, Stewart was recruited by the University of Tennessee Health Science Center to establish and direct the Center for Health in Justice Involved Youth. While there, she became the first African-American president of the American Psychiatric Association.
- Barbara Sharief earned a Doctor of Nursing Practice from Wilkes University, founded South Florida Pediatric Homecare, Inc. that provides home healthcare services for children and adults who would otherwise need to stay in a hospital or intensive care environment, and then entered politics and became the first African-American woman mayor of Broward County, Florida.

T

- Michelle Taylor is an American pediatrician and public health official currently serving as the commissioner for the Baltimore City Health Department since 2025.
- Susan C. Taylor is a dermatologist. She is the Bernett L. Johnson, Jr., M.D. Professor and the vice chair of Diversity, Equity, and Inclusion in the department of dermatology at the Perelman School of Medicine at the University of Pennsylvania. She is the 84th president of the American Academy of Dermatology, the first African-American in the role.
- Irene Trowell-Harris in 1987 as a US National Guard nurse became the first African-American woman promoted to the rank of major general.
- Patricia L. Turner in 2022 became the first African American, and first woman to serve as executive director and Chief Executive Officer of the American College of Surgeons.

W

- Kara Odom Walker serves as the Chief Population Health Officer at Nemours Alfred I. duPont Hospital for Children, where she leads all aspects of population health strategy, research, innovation and implementation.
- Akilah Weber is a board-certified OBGYN and leads the Pediatric & Adolescent Gynecology Division at Rady Children's Hospital-San Diego. Weber is also a politician serving as a member of the California State Senate since 2024.
- Nadja West in 2015 became the first African-American Surgeon General of the United States Army.
- Consuelo H. Wilkins is a physician, biomedical researcher, and health equity expert. She is Senior Vice President and Senior Associate Dean for Health Equity and Inclusive Excellence at Vanderbilt University Medical Center. She is a professor of medicine in the Department of Medicine, Division of Geriatrics at Vanderbilt University School of Medicine and has a joint appointment at Meharry Medical College.
- Karen Winkfield in 2005 became the second black woman to complete the medical scientist program at Duke University School of Medicine.

Y

- Yasmin Hurd In 2017 elected to the National Academy of Medicine, and she is the Ward-Coleman Chair of Translational Neuroscience and the Director of the Addiction Institute at Mount Sinai.

Z

- Jasmine Zapata in 2021 was named the chief medical officer and state epidemiologist for community health at Wisconsin Department of Health Services.
