= Gwendolyn Foster =

Gwendolyn Foster may refer to:

- Gwendolyn Audrey Foster, American experimental filmmaker, artist and author
- Gwendolyn A. Foster, U.S. Air Force general, nurse practitioner, and midwife
