= Ruth Easterling =

Ruth Easterling may refer to:

- Ruth M. Easterling, member of the North Carolina House of Representatives
- Ruth Marguerite Easterling, American pathologist
