= Yvonnecris Veal =

American physician

Yvonnecris Smith Veal (born 1936) is an American physician known for her leadership and advocacy for African-American women physicians. She was the first woman leader of the National Medical Association Board of Trustees and one of the first African-American students at the Medical College of Virginia.

== Early life and education ==
Born Yvonnecris Smith in Ahoskie, North Carolina, she had ten siblings including the Tuskegee airmen, Graham and Reginald. She attended Hampton University (then Institute) for her undergraduate education, graduating in 1957. She then attended the Medical College of Virginia, becoming its fifth African-American student; black students were not allowed to attend the white students' graduation ceremony. This affront prompted Veal to become an activist for African-Americans in medicine throughout her career and to join the National Medical Association immediately after graduation. Despite discrimination, she graduated in 1962 and moved to Brooklyn, New York City, to become a resident in pediatrics at the Kings County Hospital Center.

== Career ==
Veal began her career as a private practice physician in New York City. She began to take on leadership roles in various community health centers during the 1970s. In 1984, she became an occupational physician when she began to work for the United States Postal Service, the organization where she would stay for the remainder of her career. In 1993, Veal was promoted to Senior Medical Director and was still in this role when the 2001 anthrax attacks threatened postal service employees. She was commended for her role in maintaining workers' health throughout the incident.

== Honors and awards ==
- Chair, National Medical Association Board of Trustees (1989)
- President, National Medical Association (1995)
- Mary McLeod Bethune Award, National Council of Negro Women (1996)
- National Medical Directors' Award, U.S. Postal Service (1997, 2002)
- Pinnacle Award, Region One of the National Medical Association (2014)
- Legacy Award, The Susan Smith McKinney Steward Medical Society (2016)
- Member, Delta Sigma Theta
- Member, National Council of Negro Women
- Member, American Medical Association
- Member, American College of Occupational and Environmental Medicine
- Member, National Association for the Advancement of Colored People (NAACP)
