= Tracie C. Collins =

American physician

Tracie Collins

Academic background
- Education: University of Central Oklahoma (BS); University of Oklahoma (MD); Harvard University (MPH); Dartmouth College (MHCDS)

Academic work
- Discipline: Medicine; Public health
- Institutions: University of Oklahoma; Harvard Medical School; Baylor College of Medicine; University of Minnesota; University of Kansas; University of New Mexico

Secretary of Health of New Mexico
- Incumbent
- Assumed office December 2020
- Governor: Michelle Lujan Grisham
- Preceded by: Kathy Kunkel

Tracie C. Collins is an American academic, physician, and government official serving as the Secretary of Health of New Mexico. Prior to her confirmation by the New Mexico Senate on February 19, 2021, Collins was the dean of the University of New Mexico College of Population Health.

== Education ==
Collins earned a Bachelor of Science degree in chemistry from the University of Central Oklahoma, a Doctor of Medicine from the University of Oklahoma College of Medicine, a Master of Public Health from Harvard University, and a Master of Health Care Delivery Science from Dartmouth College.

== Career ==
Collins completed an internal medicine residency at the University of Oklahoma and two fellowships at Harvard Medical School. Collins worked on the faculty of the Baylor College of Medicine before becoming an associate professor at the University of Minnesota Medical School. From 2011 to 2019, Collins was a professor and department chair of the University of Kansas School of Medicine. In 2019, she became dean of the University of New Mexico College of Population Health. On November 11, 2020, Governor Michelle Lujan Grisham selected Collins as the Secretary of Health of New Mexico. She was confirmed by the New Mexico Senate on February 19, 2021.
