= Gertrude Hunter =

American doctor and professor of medicine

- Gertrude Hunter
- Born: Gertrude Teixeira; 1926; Boston, Massachusetts, U.S.
- Died: March 12, 2006 (aged 79); Silver Spring, Maryland, U.S.
- Occupations: Doctor, professor

Gertrude Teixeira Hunter (1926 – March 12, 2006) was an American doctor and professor of medicine. She served as the national director of health services for Head Start, and later became health administrator for the New England region of the United States Public Health Service. Over her career, she worked in several roles at Howard University College of Medicine. She was also an activist for AIDS healthcare in minority communities.

== Early life and education ==
Gertrude Teixeira was born in Boston, Massachusetts in 1926 to Antonio Dias and Carrie Teixeira. Her father was originally from Cape Verde, but came to the United States in 1902, where he ran a food manufacturing company in addition to working as a chef and owning a restaurant. He and his wife had four children, of whom Gertrude was the oldest. Gertrude Texeira attended high school in Boston. Although her academic advisor had put her in the "domestic arts" curriculum path (one that would eventually prepare her for housekeeping work), her mother's opposition and insistence that she would attend college led Gertrude to be moved to a college preparatory track. After graduation, she attended Boston University. After performing well on a medical aptitude test, she was accepted to Howard University College of Medicine in Washington, D.C. while she was still in her junior year. She went on to attend, and graduated with her Doctor of Medicine in 1950. She did her internship and residency at Freedman's Hospital in Washington, D.C. and the Homer G. Phillips Hospital in St. Louis, Missouri.

During medical school, Gertrude Teixeira met classmate Dr. Charles H. Hunter, who later went into radiology. She married him in 1952, and they went on to have six children.

== Career ==
After graduating from medical school, Hunter became an instructor in Howard University College of Medicine's microbiology department. She also taught as an assistant professor in the physiology department, where she also researched gastrointestinal physiology. In 1956, she was appointed as a clinician in the pediatrics department. She worked here until 1965, and during this time published on her work on antibiotics and development of African American children.

In 1965, Hunter was appointed as the first national director of health services for Project Head Start, a program that worked to provide resources and support to low-income children. During her time in this position, she helped create a national program to provide healthcare and immunizations for preschool-aged children that provided care for millions of children.

In 1971, Hunter became New England's regional health administrator for the United States Public Health Service.

Hunter returned to Howard University in 1976, where she became a professor and the head of the Department of Community Health and Family Practice. In this position, she developed the family residency program and worked to fund her department's international program. She also created a School of Public Health. In 1978, she worked with other black doctors on an initiative to vaccinate impoverished people across the United States. She continued to chair the Community Health and Family Practice department until 1980, when she transitioned to become the head of the community health service, a division of this department.

In 1985, Hunter worked as the chair of a National Council of Negro Women medical task force. As a part of this work, she helped to implement a countrywide effort to encourage African Americans to attend to their healthcare.

Hunter retired from Howard University in 1988. After her retirement, she created the Human Services Educational and Research Institute, a non-profit that works to create programs and policies benefiting underprivileged and low-income people of color. The organization focused particularly on women's health and AIDS. She helped minority groups establish health services, and she was one of the first doctors to focus on second-generation AIDS patients. She once described creating support for AIDS patients within black communities as "one of the last battles in the civil rights movement."
