= Louise Celia Fleming =

African-American physician (1862–1899)

- Dr. Louise Celia “Lulu” Fleming
- Born: January 28, 1862; Fleming Island, Florida
- Died: June 20, 1899 (aged 37); Philadelphia, Pennsylvania
- Education: Shaw College, Women’s Medical College of Philadelphia
- Occupations: Physician, Missionary

Louise Celia "Lulu" Fleming (January 28, 1862 – June 20, 1899) was an American physician. She was one of the first African Americans to graduate from the Women's Medical College of Pennsylvania. She returned from Africa to improve her skills and she was the first African American woman to be commissioned for work in Africa by the Woman's American Baptist Foreign Missionary Society.

== Biography ==
Fleming was born on January 28, 1862 to enslaved parents on Col. Lewis Michael Fleming's Hibernia Plantation in Hibernia, Clay County, Florida. Fleming's parents had unique backgrounds; her mother was half Congolese and her father was half white. When Fleming was young, her father fought with the Union Army during the American Civil War and died after two years of service.

In December 1877, Fleming converted to Christianity at age 15 at the Bethel Baptist Institutional Church in Jacksonville. She graduated from Shaw University as valedictorian on May 27, 1885. Fleming became a public school teacher in Saint Augustine, Florida.

In 1886, the Woman’s Baptist Foreign Mission Society of the West invited Fleming to become their missionary representative to the Congo Free State, now the Democratic Republic of the Congo. She accepted the invitation and arrived in the Congo in 1887, stationed at Palabala. She worked in the Congo with girls, teaching Sunday school, primary classes and English classes. Fleming returned to the United States in 1891 due to failing health.

With the idea of alleviating illness in the Congo, Fleming enrolled in the Women's Medical College of Pennsylvania (WMCP) in Philadelphia in 1891. The WMCP was the first medical college established for the education of women to become doctors; defying social norms and allowing women the opportunity to obtain high levels of education. By 1925, eighteen African American women had graduated from WMCP; one of which was Louise Fleming who graduated in 1895.

Fleming returned to her mission in the Congo, becoming the only African American woman doctor in the country. In 1898, she contracted African trypanosomiasis and returned to the United States. Fleming died on June 20, 1899 at the Samaritan Hospital in Philadelphia at the age of 37.
