= Kameron Leigh Matthews =

American physician

- Born: Philadelphia, Pennsylvania, USA
- Spouse: Mazi Mutafa

Academic background
- Education: BSc, public policy studies, 2000, Duke University; MD, Johns Hopkins School of Medicine; JD, University of Chicago Law School
- Website: tour4diversity.org

Kameron Leigh Matthews is an American physician.

== Early life and education ==
Matthews was born and raised in Philadelphia, Pennsylvania. Growing up, she was enrolled in the Cheltenham School District and was inspired by her family physician father to pursue a career in medicine. Matthews enrolled at Duke University majoring in public policy due to her interests in larger advocacy work and impacting larger populations. She enrolled at Johns Hopkins School of Medicine following her undergrad but took leave to attend the University of Chicago Law School. Matthews was a Tony Patiño Fellow at the Law School, and she served as an intern at LAF and at the Sargent Shriver National Center on Poverty Law.

== Career ==
Upon completing her medical and legal studies, Matthews finished her residency training at the University of Illinois at Chicago. She then became a staff physician at the Cook County jail and the juvenile detention center before running a family health clinic in Humboldt Park. During her tenure at the Cook County jail, Matthews advocated for the use of hormones for transgender inmates. Following this, she returned to the University of Illinois and served as the chief medical officer of Mile Square Health Center and medical director with the University of Illinois Hospital and Health Sciences System's Department of Managed Care.

While in law school, Matthews co-founded the Tour for Diversity in Medicine (T4D) project, which aimed to recruit African American and Latino physicians, dentists, and podiatrists to visit college campuses and mentor minority students. She revisited the project in 2012 with former classmate Alden Landry and completed four tours on 23 campuses in 17 states and the District of Columbia, during which they reached over 1,800 minority undergraduate and high school students. As a result of her efforts, Matthews was recognized as a 40 Under 40 Leader by the National Minority Quality Forum. In 2016, Matthews became the deputy executive director of provider relations and services in the Office of Community Care at the Veterans Health Administration.

From 2018 to 2020, Matthews served as a National Academy of Medicine (NAM) James C. Puffer, MD/American Board of Family Medicine (ABFM) Fellow, which enabled her to "participate in the work of the Academies and further their careers as future leaders in the field." Following this, she was elected a Member of the NAM for "leading a significant transformation in veterans’ health care by leveraging the Veteran Health Administration's internal assets and external collaborations with academic and other community providers to deliver timely, high-quality care to all veterans regardless of residence." In 2020, Matthews was appointed the chief medical officer of the Veterans Health Administration.

In January 2022, Matthews was appointed Chief Health Officer of Cityblock Health, a value-based healthcare provider for Medicaid and lower-income Medicare beneficiaries.

== Personal life ==
Matthews is married to Mazi Mutafa.
