= Mary E. Merritt =

American nurse

Mary Eliza Merritt (April 27, 1881 – 1953) was an American nurse who was the first African American to be licensed as nurse in Kentucky. Merritt was awarded the Mary Mahoney Medal for distinguished service in nursing from the National Association of Colored Graduate Nurses in 1949.

Merritt spent most of her career as a nurse educator and supervisor at the Red Cross Hospital in Louisville, Kentucky where at the time most African American nurses in Kentucky received their training. The Red Cross Hospital was the only place in Kentucky that African Americans could be trained as a nurse until 1937.

== Early life and education ==
Mary Eliza Merritt, the only child of Thomas and Catherine or Kitty (Dorsey) Merritt, was born near Berea, Kentucky on April 27, 1881.

After completing her primary schooling, at age 12, Merritt attended Berea College and obtained credentials to teach school. She taught school in Manchester, Kentucky for several years. When Berea College added a nursing training program, she returned to school and graduated in 1902 with a two-year degree in nursing. In 1904 when the Day Law forced segregation of the colleges in Kentucky, Merritt finished her nurses training at Freedman's Hospital in Washington, D.C that was affiliated with Howard University.

== Nursing career ==
In 1906, after Merritt graduated from Freedman's training program, she returned to Kentucky and worked as a private duty nurse caring for retired politician Cassius M. Clay. She was the first African American to work as a registered nurse in Kentucky.

In 1907, Merritt moved to Leavenworth, Kansas and worked as a nursing supervisor at Protective Home and Mitchell Hospital. She started a nursing training program and remained in Kansas until the first class graduated.

=== Red Cross Hospital ===
Louisville's Red Cross Hospital was founded by African Americans during the Jim Crow era when racial segregation kept most African Americans from receiving medical treatment in the local area hospitals. The Red Cross Hospital was the only place in Kentucky that African American's could be trained as a nurse until 1937.

Merritt spent most of her career as a nurse educator at the Red Cross Hospital where most African Nurses in Kentucky received their training. She was the Superintendent of nursing from 1914 to 1945. Merritt retired in 1945.

=== World War I ===
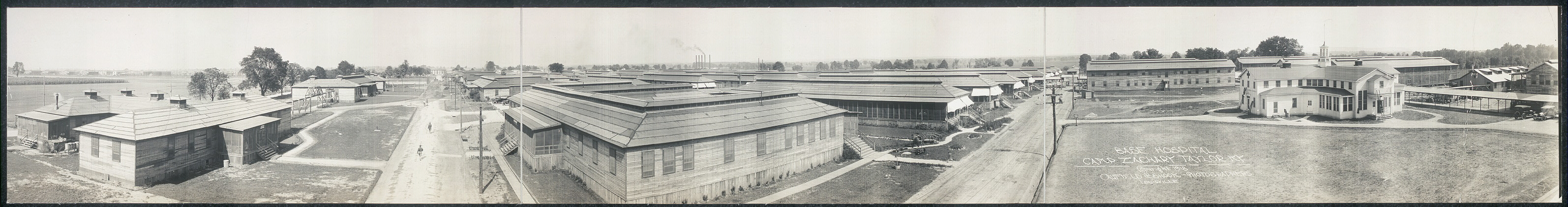
Camp Taylor, circa 1918.

At the start of World War I, African American nurses were excluded from volunteering because of their race. After the pandemic "Spanish flu" occurred in 1918, African American soldiers were treated at Camp Taylor in Louisville. African American nurses, including Merritt, were hired to care for these soldiers. Merritt was awarded a certificate of merit by United States President Woodrow Wilson for her work during World War I at Camp Taylor.

== Later life, recognition, and death ==
Merritt retired in 1945. She died in Louisville in 1953.

The Merritt Building at Central State Hospital is named for Merritt. Merritt was inducted into the Kentucky Hall of Fame.
