= Lola N. Vassall =

Jamaican-American physician

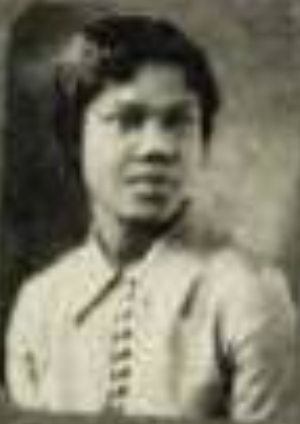
- Lola N. Vassall, from the 1928 yearbook of Howard University
- Born: August 26, 1906; Saint Catherine Parish, Jamaica
- Died: September 26, 2002 (aged 96); San Francisco, California, U.S.
- Occupations: Pharmacist, physician

Lola Nydia Vassall (August 26, 1906 – September 26, 2002) was a Jamaican-American physician.

== Early life and education ==
Vassall was born in Saint Catherine Parish, Jamaica, the daughter of William Featherstone Vassall and Septina Creary Vassall. She moved to New York City with her family in 1917. Her father and her older sister Lurline helped establish the Harlem Hospital School of Nursing. She graduated from Washington Irving High School, and finished pharmacy school at Howard University in 1932. She earned her medical degree at Howard University in 1936.

== Career ==
Vassall served internships at Freedmen's Hospital in Washington, D.C. and at Harlem Hospital. She had a private practice in New York City. After she married in 1950, she worked as a civilian physician at United States Army hospitals in Vienna, Washington, D.C., Monterey, California, and finally at Letterman Army Hospital in San Francisco, California.

Vassall was a charter life member of the Howard University Medical Alumni Association (HUMAA). Her cousin Randall Dudley Bloomfield, also a physician, cited her as an early influence in his career.

== Personal life ==
Vassall became a United States citizen by naturalization in 1939. She married a fellow Howard alumnus and physician, Lindley R. Mordecai, in 1950, in New York City. They divorced in 1970, in San Francisco. She died in 2002, in San Francisco, at the age of 96.
