= Kara Odom Walker =

American physician

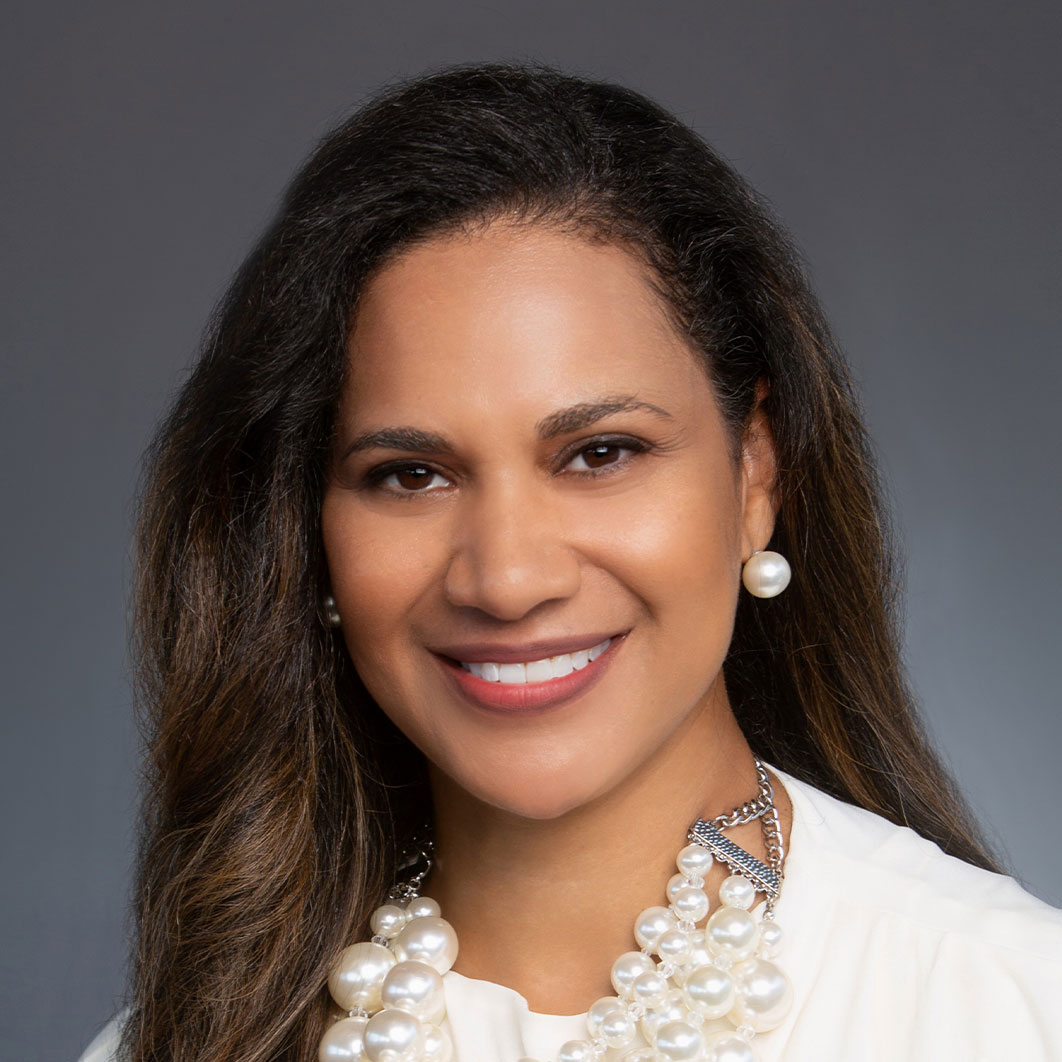
- Walker in 2018

Secretary of Delaware Department of Health and Social Services
- In office February 6, 2017 – June 2020
- Governor: John Carney

Personal details
- Education: University of Delaware; Jefferson Medical College; Johns Hopkins School of Public Health; University of California, Los Angeles
- Previous workplaces: University of California, San Francisco, 2010 – 2012; Patient-Centered Outcomes Research Institute, 2012 – 2017
- Current workplace: Nemours Alfred I. duPont Hospital for Children

Kara Odom Walker is an American physician who is the Chief Population Health Officer at Nemours Alfred I. duPont Hospital for Children, where she leads population health strategy, research, innovation and implementation. Her responsibility includes the advancement of the overall health and well-being of children, both broadly and among the populations served by Nemours Children's. Walker is a board-certified, practicing family physician.

Walker also leads Nemours Delaware Valley primary care network and its Value-Based Services Organization. From February 2017 to June 2020, she served as Secretary of the Delaware Department of Health and Social Services. Prior to that, she served as the Deputy Chief Science Officer at the Patient-Centered Outcomes Research Institute (PCORI) In 2018, she was elected to the National Academy of Medicine.

== Education ==
Odom Walker attended high school in Bear, Delaware and graduated as valedictorian from Caravel Academy high school. She then attended the University of Delaware where she graduated cum laude with her bachelor's degree in chemical engineering in 1999. She then attended Jefferson Medical College, where she received her Doctor of Medicine in 2004. During that time, she also received a Master of Public Health degree in Health Policy and Management from Johns Hopkins University in 2003.

Odom Walker then moved to California to complete her residency training specializing in family medicine at the University of California, San Francisco. She then became a Robert Wood Johnson Clinical Fellow at the University of California, Los Angeles, where she also completed a Masters of Health Services Research in 2009. During her time there, she studied how hospital closures impacted underserved minority populations in Los Angeles.

== Career ==
In 2010, Odom Walker became an Assistant Clinical Professor in Family and Community Medicine at University of California, San Francisco, researching health disparities and working to understand how best to provide high quality, coordinated care with patients' needs in mind. In 2012, Odom Walker became a Program Officer at the Patient-Centered Outcomes Research Institute (PCORI) and became Deputy Chief Science Officer in 2013.

On February 6, 2017, Odom Walker was sworn in as Secretary of the Delaware Department of Health and Services, working under the administration of Governor John Carney. As Secretary, she has worked to develop policies and programs to prioritize patient outcomes in Delaware's healthcare system. In this role, she has overseen Delaware's response to the Coronavirus disease 2019 (COVID-19) pandemic. In March 2020, she warned that half of Delaware's positive COVID-19 tests were among people aged 18 to 49, urging caution among younger populations that may have thought they had low risk of developing serious symptoms.

In June 2020, Odom Walker stepped down from her post as Delaware Health Secretary to begin a position at the Washington branch of Nemours Children's Health System as Senior Vice President and Chief Health Officer.

== Awards and honors ==
- Elected Fellow, National Academy of Medicine, 2018
