= Michele K. Evans =

American internist and medical oncologist

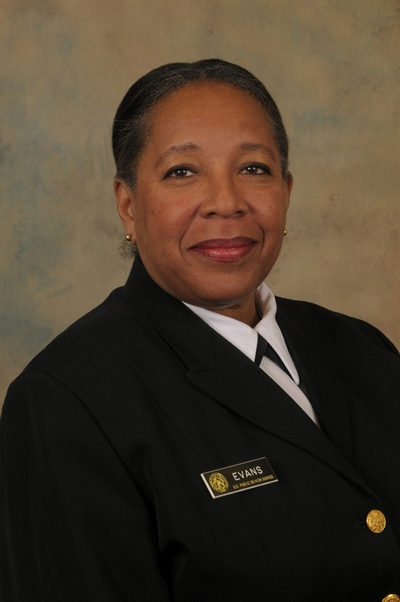
- Education: Barnard College (A.B.); Robert Wood Johnson Medical School (M.D.)
- Scientific career
- Fields: Health disparities
- Workplaces: National Institute of Aging

Michele Kim Evans is an American internist and medical oncologist. She is a senior investigator and Deputy Scientific Director at the National Institute on Aging.

== Education ==
Evans graduated from Barnard College in 1977 with an A.B. degree in biology. She received a medical degree from the University of Medicine and Dentistry of New Jersey-Robert Wood Johnson Medical School in 1981. Evans received postgraduate training in internal medicine at Emory University School of Medicine and fellowship training in medical oncology within the Medicine Branch of the Clinical Oncology Program at the National Cancer Institute.

== Career ==
Evans is an internist and medical oncologist who was trained as a physician scientist. She conducts epidemiologic clinical research in health disparities and basic bench research on the biology of health disparities. She has investigated the impact of factors including housing insecurity, obesity, and even coffee drinking on health outcomes. Evans and her colleagues argue race is an important social issue affecting patient and public health. According to the National Institutes of Health, "Under Dr. Ruffin’s leadership, minority health and health disparities research became a major focus area within NIH...Dr. Ruffin’s dream of an Institute with an intramural research program dedicated to minority health and health disparities research has been realized." She served as a member of the United States Public Health Service Commissioned Corps until 2017, retiring as a captain.

Evans serves as Deputy Scientific Director at National Institute on Aging (NIA) as well as the Training Director for the NIA Intramural Research program. She is a senior investigator of NIA's Laboratory of Epidemiology and Population Science. Dr. Evans has been published in The New England Journal of Medicine, and Molecular and Cellular Biology. In July 2020, Evans wrote an article called Covid's Color Line, published in The New England Journal of Medicine. She investigated how members of Latinx, Black, American Indians and Alaskan Natives had either the most cases, hospilizations and deaths by Covid than any other group. She attributes the data to the reality of improper, disproportionate health care access for non-white peoples and social class issues. Evans also participated in research exploring the long-term effect of cannabis on the kidney.
