= Ann Bradford Stokes =

American nurse

Ann Bradford Stokes (1830–1903) was an American nurse. A former slave, Stokes eventually volunteered in the United States Navy as a nurse on the USS Red Rover in 1863. She is the first American woman to receive a military pension for her own services and was one of the first African American women to serve as a nurse in the Navy.

== Biography ==
Stokes was born in 1830 into slavery as Ann Bradford in Rutherford County, Tennessee. In January 1863, she had escaped slavery and was taken aboard a ship. That same month, she volunteered to work as a nurse on the United States Navy hospital ship USS Red Rover where she assisted Sisters of the Holy Cross. Stokes was assigned the rank of "first class boy" and was paid for her work. Stokes worked until October 1864 when she resigned due to exhaustion.

She married Gilbert Stokes, who had also worked on the Red Rover and they moved to Illinois. After Gilbert died in 1866, Stokes remarried in 1867 to George Bowman. She applied for a military pension first based on her marriages in the 1880s, but was turned down. Later, after learning to read and write, she applied again for a pension based on her own military service and she was granted a pension of $12 a month in 1890. Not only was Stokes one of the first African American women to serve as a nurse in the US. Navy, but she was also the first American woman to receive a pension for her own service in the Navy.

Stokes lived in Belknap, Illinois until she died in 1903.
