= Joyce Nichols =

American physician assistant

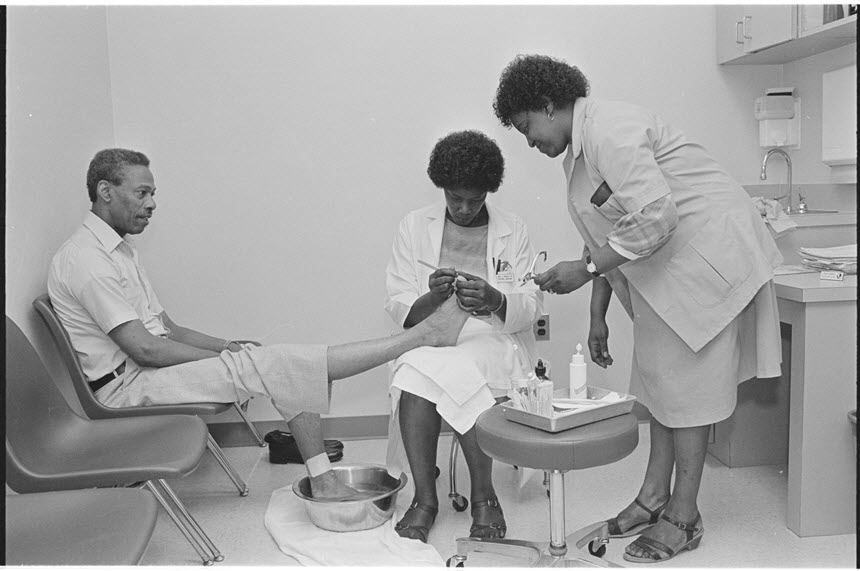
Joyce Nichols, center, and Shirley Thompson, right, treat Raymond Hayes in 1983.

Joyce Nichols (née Clayton, June 28, 1940 - July 29, 2012) was an American physician assistant (PA). Nichols was the first woman and black woman to be certified as a PA, graduating from the Duke University Medical Center program in 1970.

== Biography ==
Nichols was born as Joyce Clayton on June 28, 1940, in Roxboro, North Carolina. Nichols was married at age 16, though with encouragement from her parents, she finished high school and went onto to beauty school. Later, she attended Carolina College (later North Carolina Central University) where she made it half-way to a degree in psychology before her finances ran out. In 1965, she received a scholarship to study as a licensed practical nurse (LPN) and after graduation in 1966, she started working in the cardiac care unit at Duke Hospital. In the hospital, she learned about the physician's assistant (PA) class at the Duke University Medical Center from a former Navy corpsman who worked with her in her cardiac unit.

The PA Program had been made up strictly of men, especially those with former experience as Navy corpsmen, was reluctant to enroll Nichols. However, she was encouraged to apply by Doctor Eugene Stead, the creator of the PA training program. Nichols was accepted and fought to be given the same stipend as the men in the program. During her training, she still worked in the cardiac unit to support her family. She and her family also lost their house due to a fire in 1969 and the faculty and students at the PA school helped to raise money to help Nichols' family. They put on a dance, sold tickets and raised enough funds to replace her household items and buy clothing and Christmas presents for the kids that year. Right before her graduation she met with Doctor Eugene Stead to talk about her employment and she was exploring the possibility of working for a couple of local African-American physicians who had been her preceptors in the program. Nichols graduated from the program in 1970, becoming the first woman to earn a degree as a PA.

When she graduated, she was able to get funds with the help of Doctor E. Harvey Estes Jr., to open a rural, satellite health clinic. She worked in Rougemont and Bahama for two years, providing preventative healthcare to individuals who had not had easy access to medicine in the past. In 1972, she moved to the Lincoln Community Health Center and continued to provide healthcare to rural communities. Nichols continued here until her retirement in 1995. At the time of her retirement she was managing the Diabetes and Hypertension Clinics and providing primary care services to the homeless shelter in Durham. After retirement, Nichols stayed involved in her community in various capacities, including raising money for healthcare and volunteering in political campaigns.

She was inducted into the Duke University PA Alumni Hall of fame in 2002 for her concerns for poor people and her advocacy skills.

Nichols died in her home in Durham, North Carolina on July 29, 2012. At her funeral, three of her close professional colleagues, John Davis, PA-C, Earl Echard, PA-C and Lovest Alexander, PA-C, paid tribute to her legacy as a pioneering physician assistant.

In July 2020, the PA Foundation announced the launch of the Joyce Nichols Memorial Scholarship, a new scholarship to be award to Black PA students. Based upon the funding that was committed at the time of the announcement, a minimum of four $1,000 were to be awarded in 2020 and the next five years following.
