= Catherine Mae McKee McCottry =

African American physician

Catherine Mae McKee McCottry (February 3, 1921– February 6, 2018) was the first female African American physician in Charlotte, North Carolina, and the first female African American obstetrician and gynecologist in Charleston, South Carolina. She worked to desegregate hospitals, becoming the first African American physician to work in Charleston hospitals.

== Early life and education ==
Catherine Mae McKee McCottry was born to Violet and John Miller McKee on February 3, 1921 in Charlotte, North Carolina.

She attended Barber-Scotia College in Concord, North Carolina, a finishing school for young African American women, before enrolling at Johnson C. Smith University. In 1941, she earned her Bachelor of Science from Johnson C. Smith. She was then accepted into Howard University College of Medicine in Washington, D. C., one of the largest medical schools for African Americans in the United States.

She met her husband, Dr. Turner McCottry, while at Howard. He was a Charleston native who graduated from Meharry Medical College.

While at Howard, McCottry studied under the famous surgeon and medical researcher, Dr. Charles Drew. His mentorship helped to guide McCottry and strengthen her passion for the medical field. McCottry graduated from Howard University College of Medicine in 1945 with a M.D. degree. She was the first female graduate of Johnson C. Smith to obtain a medical degree.

== Career ==
After earning her M.D., Dr. McCottry went on to pursue additional medical training through residencies in obstetrics and gynecology. During the time the field was heavily dominated by white men. McCottry completed her residencies at Harlem Hospital in New York City, Good Samaritan Hospital in Charlotte, North Carolina, and Provident Hospital in Chicago, Illinois. She received her professional license in 1950.

Upon completing her residencies, Dr. McCottry returned to Charlotte, North Carolina from the years of 1946 to 1952. Here, she became the city's first African American female physician. Her medical work served both a healthcare resource to African Americans and as progress and strength during the years of the Jim Crow era. McCottry was able to give quality care to women and families who had limited access to medical treatment due to racial discrimination.

In 1952, the Drs. McCottry permanently moved to Charleston, South Carolina. The couple became the first African American medical team in Charleston. The same year, McCottry established her own private obstetrics and gynecology practice. The practice was located near the Morris Street Business District, a historic center for Charleston’s African American and immigrant professionals.

Before hospital desegregation, McCottry served her black patients at the Hospital and Training School for Nurses and McClennan-Banks Hospital. At the time, during the Civil Rights Movement in the 1960s, segregation laws began to be challenged. This encouraged McCottry to apply to join the staff of Roper Hospital and St. Francis Hospital. After her applications were ignored, she pushed for legal assistance by consulting a lawyer, claiming that she would sue the hospitals if they did not give her the opportunity to serve. McCottry was supported by her peers from Howard University, and after persistence, she was admitted to the staff. Throughout her practice in the Charleston hospitals, Dr. McCottry assisted in the birth of around one thousand children, published articles in medical journals, and became a mentor to many. This began the desegregation of Charleston's hospitals and paved the way for future generations of African Americans.

== Community ==
For over four decades, Dr. McCottry dedicated herself to her community's health and education. She became Chairperson of the Health Committee for Alpha Kappa Alpha sorority and founded programs to educate young teenage girls who became pregnant. She helped counsel them as well as give them free access to prenatal care and provide healthy support systems. She lectured about preventions, treatments, and symptoms for the African American community. She launched multiple programs, including an awareness program that aimed to reduce preventable illnesses by educating ages 15–23.

She began to educate and bring awareness to fight cancer and sickle cell anemia, diseases that significantly affected African American communities. She worked side by side with the American Cancer Society and raised funds for cancer research. She would organize health fairs, clinics, and educational events. She joined the COBRA Sickle Cell Anemia Program and was a lifelong contributor.

== Recognition ==
- The Medical Alumnae Award from Howard University for fifty years of dedicated medical service
- The Palmetto Medical, Dental, and Pharmaceutical Association of South Carolina Service Award
- The Professional and Human Service Award from Alpha Phi Alpha fraternity
- The Women Who Make a Difference Award, accompanied by letters of commendation from President Bill Clinton, Senator Ernest Hollings, Senator Strom Thurmond, and Congressman James Clyburn
- A City of Charleston Proclamation declaring May 23rd as Dr. Catherine McCottry Day
- The Charleston NAACP Honorary Circle and Trailblazer Award, honoring her “vision, courage, and fortitude,” and recognizing her as a model of perseverance and service
- South Carolina Hall of Fame Inductee
