= Muriel Petioni =

American physician

- Born: January 1, 1914; Trinidad
- Died: December 6, 2011 (aged 97)
- Occupation: Physician

Muriel Petioni (January 1, 1914 – December 6, 2011) was an American physician and community activist in Harlem. She was known as the "matron of Harlem health" because she sought to fulfill the healthcare needs of the underprivileged people in Harlem.

She was born in Trinidad, but her father was exiled to Harlem in 1917 due to his opposition to the colonial government, and in 1919 the rest of his family joined him. Her father eventually became a medical doctor at the age of 40.

== Early life ==
Muriel Petioni was born to Charles Augustin Petioni and Rose Alling on January 1, 1914, in the country of Trinidad. As a child, her father was exiled to Harlem, and during this time he became a physician. Once, her family was able to join him in Harlem, her father was running a medical office from their home. As a child, Muriel enjoyed answering the door and the phone for her father's patients. This is where her love for medicine grew, and her parents wildly encouraged her to pursue her dreams.

While Muriel Petioni’s father, Charles Petioni, was still a pre-medical student, her family lived a half a mile away from the New York Colored Mission in a railroad apartment. Being close to the organization allowed them to spend more time helping Caribbean immigrants find jobs in the community and socialize adults and children to American society. Muriel remembers other people living in their household as well that were described in the census as lodgers. Muriel's family would take in the lodgers in exchange for money to help pay the rent and other expenses such as her father’s night school education.

Muriel described her early life in Harlem with limited career options for immigrants such as her family. She claimed that most immigrants only had the option of working in a local garment factory or days work that would involve traveling to the Bronx to be hired.

Muriel soon followed in her father's footsteps, because in 1934 she graduated with her B.S. from Howard University and three years later, her MD. Then in 1942, Muriel married a Tuskegee airman named Mal Woolfolk. Shortly after he returned from the war, she had her first and only son, Charles Woolfolk. As a new mother, she took time off to tend to her son and became a dedicated homemaker.

== Career and legacy ==
In 1937 Muriel graduated from Howard University Medical School, where she was the only woman in her class. Shortly after obtaining her MD, Muriel had a two-year internship at Harlem Hospital, then later became a physician at several universities. After taking a few years off when her son was born in 1947, she started her practice again on the ground floor of her home, which was also where her father had his practice. She was among the first generation of black doctors given staff privileges at Harlem Hospital in the 1950s. In addition to her private practice, she worked as school physician in Central Harlem for the New York City health department from 1950 to 1980, was supervising physician for Central and East Harlem from 1980 to 1984, and was a founder or leader of many community organizations in Harlem, including founding the Friends of Harlem Hospital.

She also founded the Susan Smith McKinney Steward Medical Society for Women in 1974 (a professional association for African-American women doctors in the Greater New York area), and was the founder and first chair of Medical Women of the National Medical Association, founded in 1976, which became the Council of Women's Concerns of the National Medical Association. Working with the Coalition of 100 Black Women, she also developed a mentorship program to guide young African-American women into careers in science and medicine. She was also a president of the Society of Black Women Physicians.

Her awards include the Howard University College of Medicine Outstanding Alumni Award, given in 1992, and the 1999 Frederick Douglass Award, bestowed by Douglass's great-great-granddaughter, which was the highest honor of the New York Urban League. In 2002 she shared the City College of New York's Generations Public Service Recognition Award with her son. In 2007 she was awarded a Barnard College Medal of Distinction.

Dr. Petioni also held many board positions during her career. The list includes membership in Upper Manhattan Empowerment Zone, local branches of the American Cancer Society, Columbia School of Social Work, Schomburg Corporation, the Greater Harlem Nursing Home, Health Promotion Center, Harlem Council of Elders, Handmaid of Mary and cancer support groups for women such as Sister to Sister. Throughout her career, she worked to embody her philosophy that medicine is a form of community service. Her commitment toward community medicine, women’s issues, and health care for underserved populations is shown by working in a practice that worked mainly with underserved populations and serving on multiple board positions.

Muriel was able to practice medicine in a variety of settings, exposing her to many different experiences. Through these experiences, she was able to witness what areas of the communities were underserved. When she found a gap in care, she often attempted to step in and assist, whether it was through encouragement or support. She claimed that her ability to work with people from a variety of backgrounds and ethnicities allowed her to gain respect for personal and cultural differences. She spent time working with poor, underserved communities as well as political elite. Muriel believes she served as a role model for many people in her community and inspired others to get involved in projects.

Petioni's obituary was included in The Socialite who Killed a Nazi with Her Bare Hands: And 144 Other Fascinating People who Died this Year, a collection of New York Times obituaries published in 2012.

== Social work ==
Muriel Petioni spent many hours contributing to the New York Colored Mission while growing up. The New York Colored Mission was a local social service organization that aimed at helping immigrants, as well as New York natives, in finding jobs. Most of the jobs that the organization found for the applicants was domestic work, although by the mid 2000s, they were able to place some individuals in factory jobs. Many of the applicants were immigrants from the Caribbean, similar to Muriel’s family. In 1927, the organization received over 500 applications for factory work from Caribbean immigrants alone. In the mid 1920s, the New York Colored Mission was functioning as settlement house model. People working in the organization would help socialize adults and children to middle class values that would aid in work and social settings.
