= Rebecca Hasson =

Associate Professor of Kinesiology

- Education: University of Massachusetts
- Scientific career
- Workplaces: University of Michigan
- Thesis: Do Metabolic And Psychosocial Responses To Exercise Explain Ethnic/Racial Disparities In Insulin Resistance? (2009)

Rebecca Hasson is an Associate Professor of Kinesiology at the University of Michigan. She researches the causes and consequences of pediatric obesity, how the environment impacts obesity related metabolic risk factors to inform health policies.

== Early life and education ==
Hasson studied exercise science at the University of Massachusetts Amherst, earning a BS in 2001 and a master's in 2005. She completed her PhD at the University of Massachusetts Amherst in 2009, with her thesis titled "Do metabolic and psychosocial responses to exercise explain ethnic/racial disparities in insulin resistance?". Which considered how non-Hispanic blacks are more insulin-resistant compared to non-Hispanic whites, which increases their risk for Diabetes mellitus type 2. Whilst at University of Massachusetts Amherst she was selected for the Atlantic 10 Conference Volleyball team.

== Research and career ==
Hasson was a postdoctoral fellow at the University of Southern California, identifying the mechanisms that contribute to health inequalities at the Childhood Obesity Research Center. In 2010 she started her second postdoctoral fellowship as a W. K. Kellogg Scholar at the University of California, San Francisco's Center on Social Disparities in Health. Before pursuing these postdoctoral opportunities, Hasson received her B.A., M.S., and PhD from the Department of Kinesiology at the University of Massachusetts.

She is an Assistant Professor of Kinesiology at the University of Michigan, where she looks at the causes and consequences of pediatric obesity. Hasson serves as the Director of the Childhood Disparities Research Laboratory within the School of Kinesiology. She combines her background in social epidemiology, pediatric endocrinology and exercise physiology in her current work. Hasson is concerned that a sedentary lifestyle can increase the risk of type 2 Diabetes and cancer. In 2017 she worked with the American College of Sports Medicine (ACSM) to increase the physical activity of American people. Together, Hasson and ACSM identified four goals:

- Spread awareness of health inequities
- Educate providers of cultural competencies
- Collaborate between healthcare, education and sports communities
- Evaluate progress

In 2018 she demonstrated that women stress less as they age.

Hasson is a mentor with the Federation of American Societies for Experimental Biology. She has served as President of the Society for the Analysis of African-American Public Health Issues. Her research has been published in several articles within peer reviewed journals, and Dr Hasson, herself has also been able to serve as an ad hoc for over thirty academic journals reviews.

== Selected publications ==
- K.A. Lê, S. Mahurkar, T. Alderete, R.E. Hasson, T.A. Adam, J.S. Kim, E. Beale, A. Greenberg, H. Allayee, M.I. Goran (2011). Subcutaneous adipose tissue macrophage infiltration is associated with hepatic and visceral fat deposition, hyperinsulinemia and stimulation of NF-{kappa}-B stress pathway. Diabetes 2801-9.
- M.C. Whitt-Glover, N.R. Keith, T.G. Ceaser, K. Virgil, L. Ledford, R.E. Hasson (2014). A systematic review of adult physical activity interventions outside the context of weight loss. Obesity Reviews 125-45.
- T.C. Adam, S. Tsao, K.A. Page, H. Hu, R.E. Hasson, M.I. Goran, M. Singh. (). Insulin sensitivity plays a role for activation of brain reward circuits in overweight Hispanic girls: a pilot study. Pediatric Obesity.
- R.E. Hasson, T.A. Adam, J.N. Davis, R.M. Watanabe, M.I. Goran (2013). Compensatory responses to insulin resistance in obese African-American and Latina girls. Pediatric Obesity e68-73.
- R.E. Hasson, T.A. Adam, J.A. Pearson, J.N. Davis, D. Spruijt-Metz, M.I. Goran (2013). Sociocultural and socioeconomic influences on type 2 diabetes risk in African-American and Latino youth. Journal of Obesity.
- R.E. Hasson, T.A. Adams, J.N. Davis, L.A. Kelly, E.E. Ventura, C.E. Byrd-Williams, C.M. Toledo-Corral, C.K. Roberts, C.J. Lane, S.P. Azen, C. Chou, D. Spruijt-Metz, M.J. Weigensberg, K. Berhane, M.I. Goran (2012). Randomized control trial to improve adiposity, inflammation and insulin resistance in obese African American and Latino youth. Obesity (Silver Spring) 811-818.
- T.A. Adam, R.E. Hasson, D. Spruijt-Metz, M.J. Weigensberg, J.N. Davis, M.I. Goran (). Fasting indicators of insulin sensitivity: effects of ethnicity and Tanner stage. Diabetes Care 994-9.
- T.C. Adam, R.E. Hasson, E.E. Ventura, C. Toledo-Corral, C.J. Lane, M.J. Weigensberg, M.I. Goran (2010). Cortisol is negatively associated with beta-cell capacity and acute insulin response to glucose in Latino youth. Journal of Clinical Endocrinology & Metabolism 4729-35.
- R.E. Hasson, T. Adam, J.N. Davis, M.J. Weigensberg, E.E. Ventura, C.J. Lane, C.K. Roberts, M.I. Goran (2010). Ethnic differences in insulin action in African American and Latino adolescents. Journal of Clinical Endocrinology & Metabolism 4048-51.
