= Gwendolyn A. Foster =

American military officer, nurse, and midwife

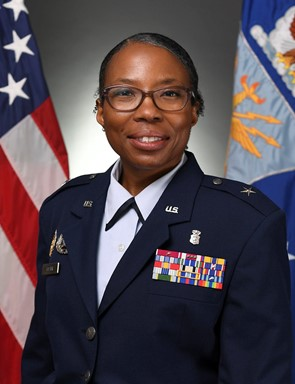
- Military career
- Allegiance: United States
- Branch: Army National Guard: United States Air Force
- Service years: 1988–1996 (Army): 2001–present (Air Force)
- Rank: Brigadier general
- Commands: 412th Medical Group; 60th Medical Group; 59th Medical Wing
- Conflicts: Iraq War
- Awards: Legion of Merit (3); Meritorious Service Medal (4)

Gwendolyn A. Foster is an U.S. Air Force brigadier general, nurse practitioner, and midwife. She is the director of staff to the surgeon general of the U.S. Air Force and Space Force and the 19th chief nurse of the U.S. Air Force Nurse Corps. Foster is the first Black female on active duty to become a general officer in the United States Air Force Medical Service.

== Life ==
Foster was born and raised in Springfield, Illinois. In 1988, at age 17, Foster joined the Illinois Army National Guard and served as a field medic in the Army Guard and Reserves until her honorable discharge in 1997. She earned a B.S. in nursing from the University of Maryland, Baltimore in 1995. Afterwards, she earned her M.S. in nursing (midwifery) from the University of Cincinnati and worked as a certified nurse-midwife (CNM) for two years.

She entered active duty U.S. Air Force as a captain on November 15, 2001. She earned a M.A. in military operation art and science from the Air Command and Staff College in 2012 and a M.A. in strategic military studies at the Air War College in 2018. In 2022, Foster became the director of staff to the surgeon general of the U.S. Air Force and Space Force. As the director of staff on matters pertaining to the medical aspects of the air expeditionary force and the health of Airmen and Guardians. She is the first Black female on active duty to become a general officer in the United States Air Force Medical Service. Foster also serves as the 19th chief nurse of the Air Force, responsible for establishing policies and maintaining programs for 19,000 active duty, Guard and Reserve nursing personnel. She is the first Black nurse to hold this position.

Foster is a fellow of the American Association of Nurse Practitioners, American College of Nurse-Midwives, and the American Academy of Nursing (2024).

== Promotions ==
Brig. Gen. Foster entered the military at 17 years old, serving in the Illinois Army National Guard and the Army Reserve for eight years as a Field Medic before being honorably discharged in 1996. Afterwards, she earned her master's degree in nursing (Midwifery) and worked as a Certified Nurse-Midwife for two years before entering active duty in 2001.

Insignia	Rank( US Air Force)	Date
	Captain	November 15, 2001
	Major	September 1, 2009
	Lieutenant colonel	February 1, 2016
	Colonel	October 1, 2018
	Brigadier general	June 7, 2024

== See also ==
- List of African-American women in medicine
- List of recipients of the Legion of Merit
