= Adrienne Williams Scott =

American ophthalmologist

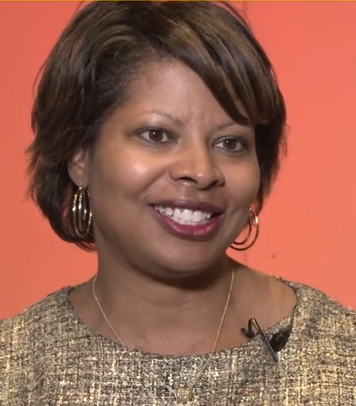
- Scott in 2018
- Education: Drexel University College of Medicine
- Scientific career
- Fields: Ophthalmology, vitrectomy
- Workplaces: Johns Hopkins Medicine

Adrienne Williams Scott is an American ophthalmologist specialized in diabetic retinopathy, epiretinal membranes, and macular degeneration. She is chief of the Wilmer Eye Institute in Bel Air, Harford County, Maryland. She is an associate professor of ophthalmology at Johns Hopkins School of Medicine.

== Life ==
Scott received a M.D. degree from Drexel University College of Medicine and completed her ophthalmology residency at the Duke University Eye Center. During her residency, Scott received the Ocular Innovation Award, the K. Alexander Dastgheib Eye Surgery Award and the Edward K. Isbey Jr. M.D. Award for clinical excellence. She remained at the Duke Eye Center to complete her two-year fellowship training in vitreoretinal surgery prior to joining the Wilmer faculty.

Scott is the former chief of the Wilmer Eye Institute – Bel Air, and associate professor of ophthalmology and vitreoretinal surgeon at the Wilmer Eye Institute, Johns Hopkins University School of Medicine. Scott's research focus is the application of novel retinal imaging technology to evaluate patients and screen patients with sickle cell disease with the goal of reducing vision loss from sickle cell retinopathy. Scott serves as the head of the Retina fellowship training program, and is the medical director of the Wilmer Bel Air clinic and the Wilmer Bel Air ambulatory surgery center.
