= Marie Imogene Williams =

First African American female graduate of the Howard University dental school

Marie Imogene Williams (born 5 November 1870) was an American dentist and teacher, the first African American female dentist to graduate from Howard University's dental school, in 1896.
