= Jeannette South-Paul =

American physician

Colonel Jeannette South-Paul
- Born: 1953 (age 72–73)
- Education: University of Pennsylvania (Bachelor's in Medical Technology); University of Pittsburgh (Medical Education); Fort Gordon, Georgia (Postgraduate medical education in Family Practice); University of North Carolina (Postgraduate medical education)
- Occupation: Physician
- Known for: First African-American and first woman permanent department chair at the University of Pittsburgh's School of Medicine
- Awards: Fellow, American Academy of Family Physicians; Diplomate, American Board of Family Medicine; Distinguished Service Medal, USUHS; Exemplary Teaching Award, American Academy of Family Physicians

Colonel Jeannette South-Paul (born 1953) is an American physician. She is the first African-American and first woman to be a permanent department chair at the University of Pittsburgh's School of Medicine.

== Early life and education ==
In 1975, South-Paul earned a bachelor's degree in medical technology from the University of Pennsylvania. She then attended the University of Pittsburgh for her medical education, graduating in 1979, then completed postgraduate medical education in family practice at Ft. Gordon, Georgia in 1982 and the University of North Carolina in 1984. She attended university on an Army scholarship, and served 22 years as a family physician in the United States Army.

== Career and research ==
South-Paul has dedicated her career to improving community health and rectifying healthcare disparities in America, especially those that affect people in poverty and people of color. In 1983, she became a professor at the Uniformed Services University of the Health Sciences (USUHS), where she taught family medicine and researched the benefits of exercise and maternal-child health along with her work on health disparities. In 2001, she became the first woman and first African-American person at the University of Pittsburgh to hold a permanent chair position, when she was appointed the Andrew W. Mathieson Professor Department Chair.

== Honors and awards ==
- Fellow, American Academy of Family Physicians
- Diplomate, American Board of Family Medicine
- Distinguished Service Medal, USUHS
- Exemplary Teaching Award, American Academy of Family Physicians
- Member, American Medical Association
- Member, National Medical Association
- Member, American Medical Women's Association
