= Lucille Norville Perez =

American physician

Lucille C. Norville Perez (born 1952) is an American physician known for her work in substance abuse and HIV/AIDS prevention.

== Early life and education ==
Perez was educated at New York Medical College, where she earned her M.D. in 1979. She completed a residency in pediatrics at Long Island Jewish Medical Center and a fellowship in adolescent medicine at Mt. Sinai Hospital.

== Career and research ==
Beginning her career in New York State, Perez had a series of short stints in public service for the first 10 years after graduating. While working at the New York City Department of Public Health, she began programs for adolescent parents and those adolescents at risk of substance abuse and HIV/AIDS. She became an activist for AIDS research in the Black community in New York City and has also researched racial inequality and injustice in medical treatment, including in analgesia, and the long-term effects of this disparity. Her research at the National Medical Association showed that people of color were stereotyped in receiving medical treatment and were at greater risk of depression and had longer recovery times. After her tenure as NMA president, Perez took a role as associate director of the federal Center for Substance Abuse Prevention, where she researched HIV prevention and substance abuse. Perez is also the founder of the Cave Institute, a nonprofit that works to eliminate health care disparities. In 2006, she became the director of UPRIS, a health technology company.

== Honors and awards ==
- President, National Medical Association (2001)
- Health Director, NAACP (2005)
- Congressional Black Caucus Special Achievement Award
- Distinguished Service Award, Department of Health and Human Services
