= Jessie Sleet Scales =

American public health nurse

- Born: 1865; Statford, Canada West
- Died: 1956 (aged 90–91)
- Known for: First African-American public health nurse in the United States

Jessie Sleet Scales (1865–1956) was the first African-American public health nurse in the United States. Scales contributed to the development and growth of public health nursing in New York City and is considered by many to be a health nurse pioneer.

== Biography ==
Scales was born in Stratford, Canada West. She attended Provident Hospital in Chicago and graduated in 1895. She then took a half-year course at the Freedman's Hospital in Washington, D.C. She subsequently worked at a winter health resort in Lakewood, New Jersey for two years and then decided to become a district nurse.

Such a feat was unheard of at the time for a black woman, but Scales was undeterred from her goal. She first applied to the St. Phoebe's Mission in Brooklyn, New York and, although they showed interest, Scales was told that there were no openings. However, they directed her to the Charity Organization Society (COS) where she was interviewed by their general secretary, Dr. Devine. Dr. Devine is accredited with noting the high incidence of tuberculosis within the African American population in New York City and decided a Black district nurse should be hired due to the time period where there were many racial barriers.

Two months later on October 3, 1900, despite opposition from the committee Scales became the first black district nurse at the COS on the recommendation of Dr. Devine. Her job was to persuade the African American community of New York City to accept treatment for tuberculosis, a major health problem during this time period. She entered the contract knowing that her salary may be discontinued after a two-month experimental period. She did so well at her job however, one year later she was fully accepted as an employee by the committee and was published by The American Journal of Nursing. Her report was titled "A Successful Experiment" and read:

I beg to render to you a report of the work done by me as a district nurse among the colored people of New York City during the months of October and November. I have visited forty-one families and made 156 calls in connection with these families caring for nine cases of consumption, four cases of peritonitis, two cases of chickenpox, two cases of cancer, one case of diphtheria, two cases of heart disease, two cases of tumor, one case of gastric catarrh, two cases of pneumonia, four cases of rheumatism, and two cases of scalp wound. I have given baths, applied poultices, dressed wounds, washed and dressed newborn babies, cared for mothers.

In addition to her work with the Charity Organization Society, Scales also worked in collaboration with a lady by the name of Elizabeth Tyler. Together, they successfully established a branch of the Henry Settlement known as the Stillman House. The Stillman House functioned to improve health conditions in the black community.

She went on to stay there for the nine years until she married her husband, John R. Scales. This branch functioned to serve Black persons. Scales and Tyler then went on to be successful in providing outstanding nursing care to underprivileged families.

Outside of her professional career, Scales was married to John R. Scales. The two of them lived in New York and had one daughter, Edna Scales.
