= Jennifer Mieres =

American cardiologist

Dr. Jennifer H. Mieres (born 1960) is an American cardiologist, academic, and writer. Mieres is the Associate Dean of Faculty Affairs at Hofstra University's Zucker School of Medicine. She is also the author of numerous books and the co-producer of 4 documentaries. She is a fellow of the American College of Cardiology and the American Heart Association. She is a fellow and former president of the American Society of Nuclear Cardiology.

== Early life and education ==
Mieres was born 1960 and grew up in Trinidad. She attended Bennington College, where she played basketball and graduated in 1982. This was followed by Boston University School of Medicine and residency at St. Luke's Hospital.

== Career ==
She wrote Heart Smart for Black Women and Latinas. The 2003 PBS documentary, A Women’s Heart, that she co-produced was nominated at the 46th Annual New York Emmy Awards. Mieres has co-produced three other documentaries.

In 2008, she was an associate professor of medicine and the director of nuclear cardiology at New York University. The same year, she also became the president of the American Society of Nuclear Cardiology, to serve a two year term.

In 2022, she was named the American Heart Association's Physician of the Year. In 2022, she was serving as senior vice president of Northwell Health's Center for Equity of Care. She was also its chief diversity and inclusion officer.

In 2025, she won the Lila A. Wallis Women's Health Award.

She is also fellow of the American College of Cardiology and the American Heart Association. She is a fellow and former president of the American Society of Nuclear Cardiology.

== Works ==
=== Books ===
- Mieres, Jennifer H., Terri Ann Parnell. (2008) "Heart Smart for Black Women and Latinas" St. Martin's Griffin. ISBN 9780739492604.
- Mieres, Jennifer H., Terri Ann Parnell, Carol Turkington. (2008) "Heart Smart for Black Women and Latinas: A 5-Week Program for Living a Heart-Healthy Lifestyle". St. Martin's Griffin. ISBN 9780312372675.
- Mieres, Jennifer H., Stacey E. Rosen. (2017) "Heart Smart for Women: Six S.T.E.P.S. in Six Weeks to Heart-Healthy Living" 10 October 2017. Onward Publishing. ISBN 978-0984900541.
- Mieres, Jennifer H., Stacey E. Rosen, Lori M. Russo. (2022) Heart Smarter for Women: Six Weeks to a Healthier Heart. Advantage Books. ISBN 9781642252460.
- Mieres, Jennifer H., Elizabeth C McCulloch, Michael P Wright. (2024) "Reigniting the Human Connection: A Pathway to Diversity, Inclusion and Health Equity."

=== Documentaries ===
- "A Women’s Heart" (2003). PBS.

== Personal life ==
In 1996, she married Haskel Fleishaker.
