= Sadye Curry =

African-American gastroenterologist

Sadye Beatryce Curry (born 1941) is the first African-American woman to become a gastroenterologist in the United States, the first African-American to do postgraduate studies at Duke University Medical Center.

== Biography ==
Curry was born the youngest of four and raised in Reidsville, North Carolina, where she was educated in the public school system and graduated high school in 1959. She attended Johnson C. Smith University, a Presbyterian school, where she studied biology and chemistry, graduating in 1963. Curry then attended Howard University College of Medicine and graduated in 1967, with postgraduate education at Duke University and the Washington D.C. Veterans Administration Medical Center. Her internship and fellowship in gastroenterology at Duke made her the first African-American resident there. While a resident, Curry researched liver transport and bile acid metabolism.

After completing her training in 1972, Curry became an assistant professor at Howard University. In addition to doing clinical work, she self-financed her research on bile acid metabolism using rats as a model organism; however, because the clinical needs were so great, she eventually discontinued her research program. She became assistant chief of medicine at Howard University Medical Service at Columbia General Hospital in 1973, and from 1974 to 1977 she served as assistant chief of medicine in charge of undergraduate medical education at Howard. She was promoted to associate professor of medicine in 1978.

She was a founder of the Leonidas Berry Society for Digestive Diseases, an organization for people of color with careers as scientists, surgeons, and gastroenterologists named after Leonidas Berry, the first African-American gastroenterologist. She was also the first woman to serve as chair of the National Medical Association's internal medicine section. After retiring from Howard, she accepted a position at Central Regional Hospital in Butner, North Carolina.

== Honors and awards ==
- Howard University College of Medicine Student Council Faculty Award for Teaching Excellence (1975)
- Kaiser Permanente Faculty Award for Excellence in Teaching (1978)
- Woman of the Year Award, Howard University College of Medicine Student American Medical Women's Association (1990)
- Member, National Institutes of Arthritis, Metabolic and Digestive Diseases Training Grants Committee in Gastroenterology
- Member, Food and Drug Administration Drug Advisory Committee
- Chair, National Medical Association (gastroenterology section; 1985–2009)
- Chair, National Medical Association (internal medicine section; 2000–2001)
- President, Leonidas Berry Society for Digestive Diseases
- Distinguished Internist of the Year, National Medical Association (2002)
- Board of Trustees, National Medical Association (2007–present)
- Chair, National Medical Association Educational Affairs Committee

== See also ==
- Gastroenterologist
- Duke University Hospital
