= Alfreda Johnson Webb =

American veterinarian

- Born: February 21, 1923; Mobile, Alabama
- Died: 14 October 1992 (aged 69); Moses H. Cone Memorial Hospital
- Education: Tuskegee University
- Known for: Joint first African-American woman Doctor of Veterinary Medicine; First Black woman to serve in the North Carolina General Assembly

Alfreda Johnson Webb (born February 21, 1923, in Mobile, Alabama) was a professor of biology and a doctor of veterinary medicine. She was the first Black woman licensed to practice veterinary medicine in the United States.

== Early life and education ==
Webb was born February 21, 1923, in Mobile, Alabama, to Cattie Lee Avant Johnson, and Bibb Garden Johnson. She earned a BS from Tuskegee Institute in 1943 and her Doctor of Veterinary Medicine (DVM) in 1949 from the Tuskegee Institute (now University) School of Veterinary Medicine. Webb was the first of two African American women to graduate from a school of veterinary medicine in the United States in 1949. She then took Faculty Study Leave from Tuskegee to earn a master's degree (M.S. in anatomy) from Michigan State University in 1950.

== Professional veterinary positions ==
She began her career as an instructor in anatomy at Tuskegee in 1950 and remained there until 1959 rising to the rank of associate professor. She then moved to Greensboro, North Carolina, and became a professor of biology at North Carolina Agricultural & Technical State University (NC A&T) from 1959 to 1978 and professor/coordinator of Laboratory Animal Science from 1977 until her retirement. Her research areas included histology, cytology, and embryology.

During her time at NC A&T in the late 1970s, Webb served on the planning committee for the school of veterinary medicine for North Carolina which was founded at North Carolina State University in 1981.

== Political and government positions ==
Webb served in several positions in the Democratic Party in North Carolina. Webb was the first African-American woman in the North Carolina General Assembly in 1972 after her appointment in 1971 by Governor Robert W. Scott. She lost a bid for a full term in the Assembly in 1972. In the Who's Who in American Politics (17th ed, 1999) she is listed as Member at Large, Democratic National Committee, North Carolina on which she served from 1972 to 1980. Formerly she served as Chairman of Minority Affairs for the North Carolina State Democratic Executive Committee, delegate to the Democratic National Convention in 1976, and president of Democratic Women of North Carolina. She also served on the North Carolina Council on Sickle Cell Syndrome. and the Board of the NC Center for Public Policy Research. She retired from the position of state minority representative in 1978 to run for the state House in Guilford County.

The General Assembly of North Carolina ratified a Senate joint resolution on March 4, 2013, to honor the life and memory of Webb and other African American legislators.

== Family life ==
Alfreda Webb was married to agronomist Dr. Burleigh Webb and they had three children, two sons and one daughter. She died at Moses Cone Memorial Hospital after a battle with breast cancer on October 14, 1992.

== Honors and awards ==
In 1949, Webb became the first black member of the Women's Veterinary Association. Webb was a member of the American Association of Veterinary Anatomists, Sigma Xi, the Hayes-Taylor YMCA, and the Gamma Sigma Delta Honorary Society. She received the Alpha Kappa Alpha Award for Political Excellence and the Distinguished Alumni Award from Tuskegee University in 1972. She was inducted into the NC A&T Agriculture Hall of Fame in 1999.

In 2016, the North Carolina State College of Veterinary Medicine established a $50,000 endowed Dr. Alfreda Johnson Webb Scholarship Award to cover educational expenses for two students from under-represented groups. The endowment was established by gifts from the North Carolina Minority Veterinarians Association and matched funds from the R.B. Terry Charitable Foundation.

The North Carolina State College of Veterinary Medicine, which sorts its faculty, staff, and students into four houses to support college well-being, has a house named after Webb. House Webb has a dog on its crest to emphasize Webb's commitment to companion and lab animals and has the motto fairness, equity, and justice.
