= Omega Silva =

African-American physician (1936–2020)

Omega C. Logan Silva (December 4, 1936 — April 2, 2020) was an American physician known for her discovery that small cell lung cancer can produce calcitonin and for her activism.

== Early life and education ==
Silva attended Howard University for all of her higher education, graduating with a bachelor's degree in chemistry in 1958 and a doctorate of medicine in 1967. Her first residency, in internal medicine, was at the Washington, DC Veterans Administration Hospital from 1967 to 1970; her fellowship in endocrinology was at George Washington University until 1974.

== Career and research ==
Though she began her career as a chemist at the National Institutes of Health, the bulk of Silva's career has been spent as a physician. After her endocrinology fellowship, she took a professorship at George Washington University; in 1977 she took a concurrent post at Howard University, becoming a full professor at both institutions in 1985 and 1991, respectively. Her research there has focused on cancer, and she discovered the secretion of calcitonin in small cell lung cancer in 1974.

Throughout her career, Silva has served in leadership roles, including as the first woman to head Howard's alumni group, a board member for the National Center for Health Research, and as a consultant for the Food and Drug Administration's immunology section and for multiple National Institutes of Health groups. She has also been an activist for universal health care in the United States and for women in medicine.

Silva died on 2 April 2020, at the age of 83.

== Honors and awards ==
- President, Howard University Medical Alumni (1983)
- Letter of Commendation, President Ronald Reagan (1984)
- Letter of Thanks, President Bill Clinton (1995)
- President, American Medical Women's Association (2000-2002)
- Master, American College of Physicians (2003)
- Foremother Award, National Research Center for Women and Families (2010)
- Board of Directors, Foundation for the History of Women in Medicine
- Member, Alpha Omega Alpha
