= Dolores Mercedes Franklin =

American dentist

Dolores Mercedes Franklin is an American dentist, health policy advocate, and author. She was the first African American woman to graduate from the Harvard School of Dental Medicine in 1974.

Franklin became the highest ranking dentist executive at Sterling Drug, the first woman and first Black person in the United States to do so at a Fortune 500 company. She was also the first woman and first Black person to hold a dean's level position at New York University College of Dentistry, the nation's largest dental school at a major university, making her the first woman and first Black person from Harvard to become a dental school dean in the United States. Franklin is also a consultant and clinical professor.

== Biography ==
Franklin graduated from Barnard College in 1970. She earned her Doctor of Dental Medicine (DMD) degree from the Harvard School of Dental Medicine (HSDM) in 1974, becoming the first African American woman, and first woman of color, to earn a Harvard DMD degree as well as one of the first five women since the school's founding more than 100 years before. In the same year, she earned her M.P.H. degree from Columbia University in a joint degree program.

Franklin began her career as dental director at the New Jersey Dental Group and a consultant to the Colgate-Palmolive Company. She left the group practice in 1975 for New York University College of Dentistry, the largest U.S. dental school, and at the age of 28, she was appointed Assistant Dean for Student Affairs, (and Admissions later). She was the first woman and the first Black dean at New York University's dental school, making her, at the same time, the first woman and first Black person from Harvard to hold a dean's level position at any dental school in the United States.

In 1979, Franklin became the first woman and first Black person to hold the highest ranking dentist executive position in a Fortune 500 company, when she was appointed at Sterling Drug, Inc., a global pharmaceutical company, to head Professional Services and Research at Cook-Waite Laboratories. She authored and completely updated the Cook-Waite textbook, Manual of Local Anesthesia in Dentistry, which had last been updated three decades earlier. The book was widely used in U.S. dental schools.

Franklin headed the National Dental Program at Job Corps, operated in 43 states, primarily by major companies, and was an oral health policy leader at the Commission of Public Health in Washington, D.C., where she launched innovative partnerships including interdisciplinary collaborations with leading institutions in the nation dedicated to health. She participated in the private and not-for-profit sectors and worked with the U.S. Departments of Labor and Health and Human Services, serving on multiple boards and as a researcher and consultant advising on regional, national-wide and global initiatives. Franklin was appointed as assistant health commissioner in New York City, the highest ranking dentist position, had dual reporting to the NYC Health and Hospitals Corporation, the nation's largest urban healthcare system, and was concurrently a clinical professor at New York University. She remains an influential advocate for oral health as integral to overall health.

Franklin has served on the board of the Harvard Alumni Association and as president of the Harvard Dental Alumni Association, is the president of Franklin-DeLoach Group, Inc., a boutique research and consulting company. A storyteller and author, she is currently working on a history of her family from its origins in the first colonies in the 1600s, the domestic slave trade, and Louisiana to 20th century migrations.

== Honors and legacy ==
Franklin is the recipient of the Harvard University Alumni Achievement Award for Excellence in Dental Medicine from the Harvard Alumni Association and the Harvard Black Alumni Society, and the Distinguished Alumni Award from the Harvard School of Dental Medicine.

A champion for equity and education, Franklin is the first Black woman in Harvard history to have an endowed scholarship for dental education named in her honor. The Freeman, Grant and Franklin Scholarship pays tribute to the legacy of Franklin and the first two Black men who were pioneers in dentistry in the United States and provides crucial support for students from underrepresented minority groups pursuing the DMD degree. The funding of the Freeman, Grant, Franklin Scholarship was initiated by a capstone gift from Colgate-Palmolive in 2021.

The namesakes, three prominent Harvard alumni, include Robert Tanner Freeman, who in 1869 became the first Black person in United States history to graduate from a dental school and a graduate of Harvard's first dental class, George Franklin Grant, who graduated in 1870 and became the first Black faculty member at Harvard University and at the dental school in 1884, and Dolores Mercedes Franklin, who became the first Black woman to graduate from HSDM in 1974, more than 100 years after the school's founding, and 100 years after the admission of the first Black men. Founded in 1867, HSDM is the first university-affiliated dental school in the United States.
