= Anna Bailey Coles =

American physician

Anna Bailey Coles (January 16 1925-3 Feb 2015) was the founding dean of Howard University’s College of Nursing.

== Background ==
Coles was born in Kansas city and became the supervisor of the Veterans’ Administration Hospital in Topeka Kansas from 1950 for a period of 8 years. While working at the hospital Coles began studying her Bachelor of Science (BS) at Avila College in Missouri, graduating in 1958, and then attended the Catholic University of America to study her Masters of Science (MS) in 1960 and her PhD in 1967. Coles became the director of nursing at Freedman's Hospital from 1961–1968, when as act of Congress to transfer Freedmen's Hospital School of Nursing over to Howard's jurisdiction, and Coles became the dean of the School of Nursing in 1969. Because of Coles leadership in nursing, the baccalaureate nursing program at Howard University recoeved recognition from the National League for Nursing in the 1972-1973 academic year.

Coles died on 3 Feb 2015 and left a legacy in the form of scholarship fund in her name at Howard University's College of Nursing.
