= Ruth Marguerite Easterling =

Pathologist

Ruth Marguerite Easterling (born February 17, 1898, Georgetown, South Carolina – died June 16, 1943, Cambridge, Massachusetts) was an American physician and pathologist.

== Early life ==
Ruth Marguerite Easterling was born in Georgetown, South Carolina, in 1898, the only child of Mr. and Mrs. James David Easterling. As a child, she moved to Cambridge, Massachusetts with her family and attended Ellis Grammar School and Cambridge Rindge and Latin School. She went on to attend Jackson College for Women and beginning the Medical School of Tufts College when she was 19 and graduating June 10, 1921. She completed her internship at Metropolitan Hospital on Wards Island.

== Career ==
Easterling worked with William Augustus Hinton to develop the Hinton test for syphilis. She also served on the staff of the Tuskegee Veterans Administration Hospital in Alabama, and was director of laboratories at the Cambridge Massachusetts City Hospital. Easterling worked with Dr. William Augustus Hinton, who in 1927 perfected the Hinton test for syphilis. The Hinton test replaced the Wasserman test as the most accurate blood serum test for syphilis.

== Death ==
Easterling died at Cambridge City Hospital of breast cancer at age 45.

== Legacy ==
In 1979, the Progressive Alliance of Minority Students organization at Tufts University School of Medicine established the Dr. Ruth M. Easterling Scholarship.
