= Army nursing =

Army nursing may refer to:

== By country ==
=== Australia ===
- Royal Australian Army Nursing Corps
- Australian Army Medical Women's Service
- Australian Service Nurses National Memorial, Canberra

=== Britain ===
- Queen Alexandra's Royal Army Nursing Corps
- Women's Royal Army Corps

=== India ===
- Military Nursing Service (India)

=== New Zealand ===
- List of New Zealand organizations with royal patronage

=== Pakistan ===
- Pakistan Army

=== Republic of Korea ===
- Republic of Korea military academies

=== Sri Lanka ===
- Sri Lanka Army Medical Corps

=== United States ===
- United States Army Nurse Corps

== Education ==
- Cadet Nurse Corps
- Uniformed Services University of the Health Sciences section USU Graduate School of Nursing

== Specific conflicts ==
- Timeline of nursing history

=== Pre-1900s ===
- International Committee of the Red Cross
- International Red Cross and Red Crescent Movement
- American Red Cross Nursing Service

=== World War I ===
- Women in the First World War

=== World War II ===
- Women's roles in the World Wars

== Military nursing services ==
- Military nurse
- U.S. Navy Nurse Corps, a staff corps of the United States Navy
- U.S. Air Force Nurse Corps

== Army nursing in films ==
- Vietnam Nurses documentary about Australian nurse experience.
- China Beach (season 1)
- China Beach (season 2)
- China Beach (season 3)
- MASH (film)
- M*A*S*H (TV series)
