= Margaret Harper =

Amerivan nurse (1911–2000)

- Born: July 23, 1911; Potomac, Illinois, U.S.
- Died: December 13, 2000 (aged 89)
- Military career
- Allegiance: United States of America
- Branch: United States Army
- Service years: 1941–1963
- Awards: Legion of Merit, Bronze Star Medal, Army Commendation Medal

Colonel Margaret Harper (July 23, 1911 – December 13, 2000) was the 11th chief of the United States Army Nurse Corps (ANC) from September 1, 1959, to August 31, 1963. She served in World War II, received a master's degree in nursing service administration from Columbia University. She received several awards for her work as chief of the Army Nurse Corps (ANC).

== Biography ==
Harper was born on July 23, 1911, in Potomac, Illinois. She graduated from Evanston General Hospital School of Nursing in 1934. Harper received her commission in April 1941 at the hospital in Fort Lewis, Washington, becoming a colonel. Her overseas assignments during World War II included service in Australia and New Guinea, and Europe. She was known for having a handgun on her at all times in New Guinea. She also served as superintendent of nurses at Chicago Memorial Hospital and Murry Hospital at one point. After World War II, Harper attended Teachers' College, Columbia University, and earned a Bachelor of Science degree in nursing education. She received her master's degree in nursing service administration in 1953.

In October 1955 Hayes became assistant chief of the ANC. On September 1, 1959, Harper became the 11th Army Nurse Corps Chief and she served until August 31, 1963. Under her tenure, the ANC began an intensive recruiting program in 1963 in light of the anticipated build up in Southeast Asia and other military operations, Operation Nightingale, to meet a serious nursing shortage. She received the Legion of Merit, Bronze Star Medal and the Army Commendation Medal. After she left the ANC, Harper moved from Illinois to Chicago to San Antonio, Texas, where she died on December 13, 2000.
