= General Dunlap =

General Dunlap may refer to:

- Charles J. Dunlap Jr. (born 1950), U.S. Air Force major general
- Lillian Dunlap (1922–2003), U.S. Army brigadier general
- Robert H. Dunlap (1879–1931), U.S. Marine Corps brigadier general

== See also ==
- Dawn Dunlop (fl. 1980s–2020s), U.S. Air Force major general
