= Operation Nightingale =

Operation Nightingale may refer to:

- Operation Nightingale (archaeology). a UK project which uses archaeology to aid the recovery of service personnel injured in conflict
- Operation Nightingale (humanitarian mission), a Singaporean Armed Forces humanitarian operation during the Gulf War
- Operation Nightingale (United States), a recruiting campaign for nurses during the Vietnam War

== See also - ==
- Nightingale (disambiguation)
