= Isabel McIsaac =

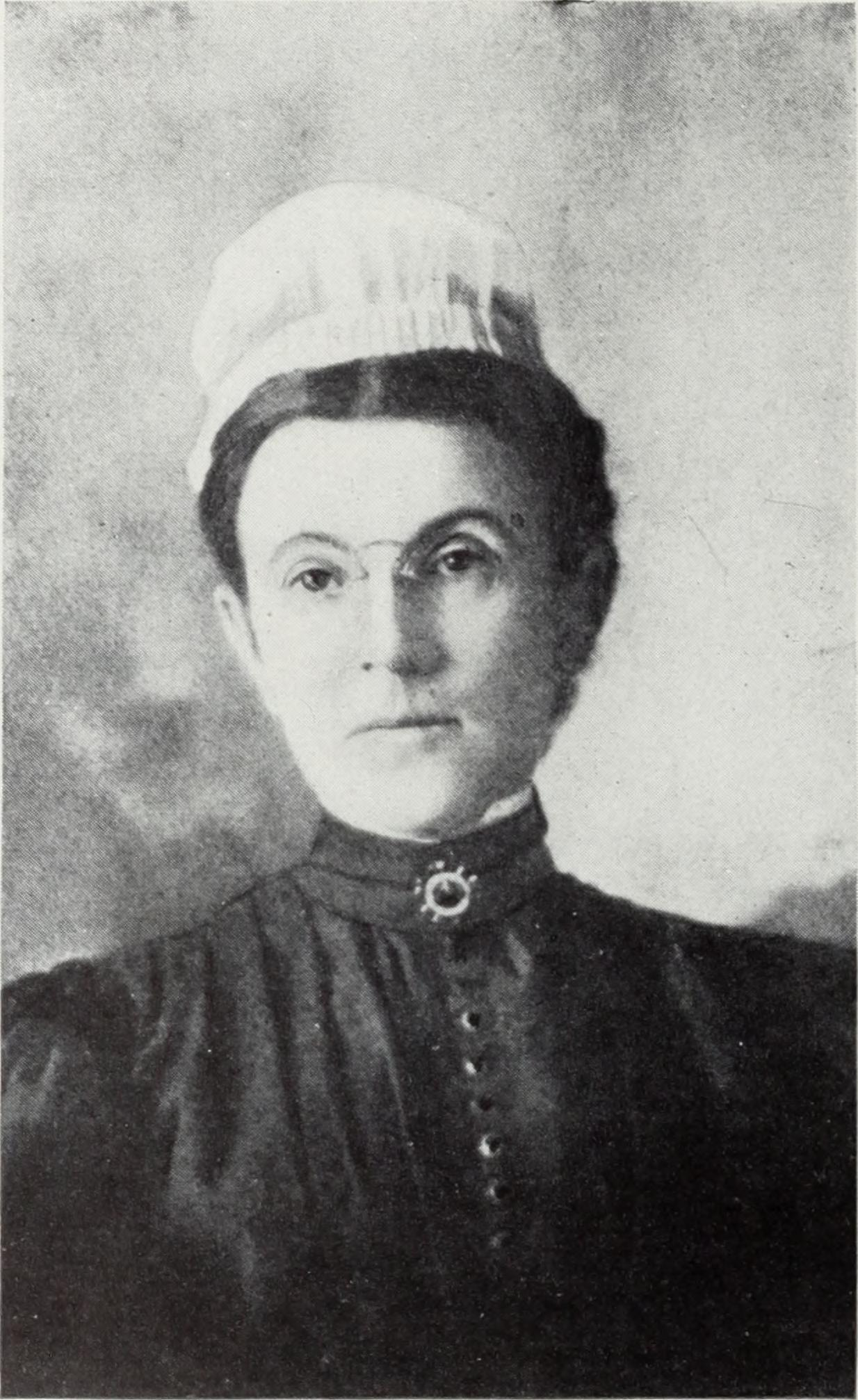
- Isabel McIsaac portrait
- Born: Isabel McIsaac c. 1858; Waterloo, Iowa, U.S.
- Died: September 21, 1914
- Education: Illinois Training School
- Occupations: Nurse and superintendent/president
- Employer(s): United States Army Nurse Corps; American Society of Superintendents of Training Schools for Nurses; American Journal of Nursing Company; American Red Cross Nursing Service; American Nurses Association

Isabel McIsaac (1858 – September 21, 1914) was the third superintendent of the United States Army Nurse Corps. She was born in 1858, in Waterloo, Iowa. Thirty years later, she graduated from the Illinois Training School, and entered the administration of the school. In 1898, she became president of the American Society of Superintendents of Training Schools for Nurses. After holding various positions, in 1905, she became superintendent of the school. The year before, she had become president of the American Journal of Nursing Company. McIsaac soon became Interstate secretary for the American Red Cross Nursing Service, and on April 1, 1912, she became the third superintendent of the Nurse Corps. she was also president of the American Nurses Association. She resigned from being superintendent for health reasons, with the resignation set for October 1, 1914, but McIsaac died on September 21, 1914, two weeks before the set date.
