= Reba Cameron =

Canadian-born American Army nurse

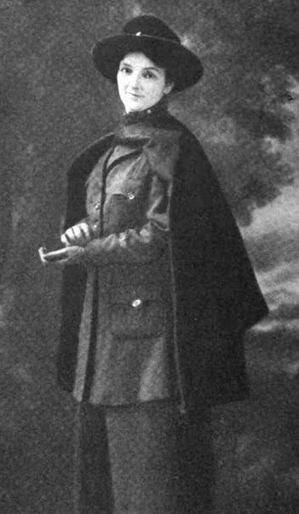
Reba G. Cameron in uniform, from a 1919 publication.

Rebecca G. Cameron (1885-1959), known as Reba G. Cameron, was a Canadian-born American Army nurse who was awarded the Army Distinguished Service Medal for her military hospital work during World War I. She also worked in the Philippines and Japan.

== Early life ==
Reba G. Cameron was born in Canada.

== Career ==
From 1911 Reba G. Cameron was Superintendent of Nurses and Occupational Director at Taunton State Hospital in Massachusetts, training her nurses in the new methods of occupational therapy. She also wrote about occupational therapy in nursing journals. During World War I, she organized patients to knit and sew for a soldiers' relief charity. She testified against legislation regarding the registration of nurses at hearings held by the Massachusetts State Committee on Public Health.

Cameron held the rank of First Lieutenant in the United States Army Nurse Corps during World War I. She was Chief Nurse of the General Hospital at Plattsburgh, New York, and later at the Debarkation Hospital at Hampton, Virginia. For her service and leadership during wartime, she was one of 24 nurses awarded the Army Distinguished Service Medal in 1923.

Cameron moved to California after the war, and worked as an army nurse in San Francisco and in the Philippines. She went to Japan on a medical relief mission following the 1923 Great Kantō earthquake, and was chief of the occupational department at the Letterman Army Hospital at the Presidio of San Francisco when she spoke to the California Society of Educational Therapy in 1926.

== Personal life ==
Cameron was "retired for physical disability" from the Army Nurse Corps in 1933. She lived in Redlands, California in her later years, and died in 1959, aged 74 years.
