= Diane Lindsay =

Captain Diane M. Lindsay was the first black woman to be awarded the Soldier's Medal.

In 1969 Diane M. Lindsay volunteered with the US Army Nurse Corps as a First Lieutenant at the 95th Evacuation Hospital in Vietnam, where she convinced a confused US soldier to surrender a grenade, which he had pulled the pin of and was preparing to throw within the hospital. Lindsay's actions saved the lives of numerous people and earned her the Soldier’s Medal. She was the first black woman to receive the award. Lindsay was eventually promoted to captain.
