= United States Air Force Nurse Corps =

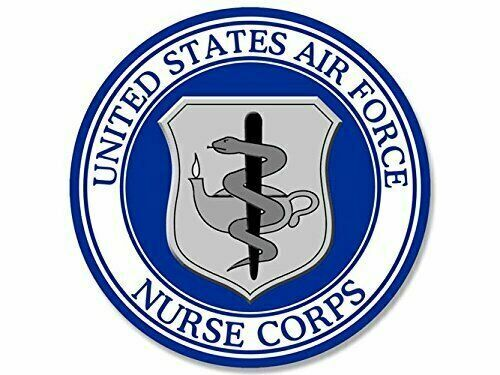
- Official Symbol of the USAF Nurse Corps

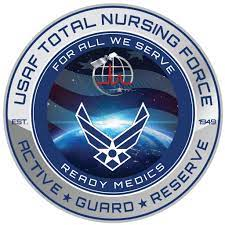
- Official Symbol of the USAF Total Nursing Force
- Motto: Caring for those Protecting our Nation
- Founded: 1 July 1949
- Website: https://www.airforce.com/careers/specialty-careers/healthcare/careers/nurse https://safn.org/

The U.S. Air Force Nurse Corps ensures the health of military personnel and their family members.

== Requirements ==
New members of the Air Force Nurse Corps are required to hold at minimum a Bachelor of Science in Nursing (BSN) degree prior to receiving a commission. After speaking with a USAF Medical Recruiter, the completion of Commissioned Officer Training (COT) is required to be fully integrated into the USAF Nurse Corps.

== Roles ==
Members of the Air Force Nurse Corps come from all aspects of Air Force Medicine and can serve in roles including Flight Nurse, Nurse Practitioner, Certified Registered Nurse Anesthetist, Clinical Nurse, Labor and Delivery Nurse, Critical Care Nurse, Pediatric Nurse, etc.

== History ==
=== US Army ===
==== 1941 ====
59,000 individuals served in the US Army Nurse Corps during World War 2

==== 1942 ====
US War Department (Department of Defence) created the 349th Air Evacuation Group for training of Flight Surgeons, Flight Nurses, and Aerovac

=== US Air Force ===
==== 1949 ====
Formed on 1 July. 1949

Flight nurses from the United States Army Air Corps transferred to the newly founded United States Nursing Corps.

==== 1950 ====
259 active flight nurses

==== 1956 ====
US Air Force Chief of Staff approved flight nurse insignia

==== 1961 ====
Men began to be commissioned into the USAF Nurse Corps due to AF JAG regulation. Congress did not officially approve till 1966.

==== 1968 ====
25th anniversary of flight nursing

==== 1974 ====
Nurse roles where expanded to include OB/GYN, Pediatrics, Primary Care, etc.

==== 1977 ====
Working toward an all college educated nurse corps

==== 2000 ====
29% of Regular Air Force (Not Reserve or Guard) medical groups where commanded by active duty nurses.

== Chief of the Air Force Nurse Corps ==
The first Chief of the Air Force Nurse Corps was Colonel Verena Marie Zeller (1949–1956). Brigadier-General E. Ann Hoefly was appointed chief in 1968. The first two-star general Chief of the Air Force Nurse Corps was Major General Barbara Brannon; she was replaced in 2005 by Maj Gen Melissa Rank. In 2008, it was announced that Colonel Kimberly Siniscalchi would be promoted to the rank of Major General and serve as the Chief of the AF Nurse Corps, thereby bypassing the rank of Brigadier General (1-star).

== Flight Nurse's Creed ==
As a Flight Nurse…

I will use my knowledge, skill and energy in the best interest of the persons entrusted to my care.

I will maintain and preserve the dignity of the patients using all the means available to me.

I will be mindful of the trust placed in me and do nothing to diminish that trust.

I will accept my responsibilities as an aeromedical team member and acknowledge the contributions of each member toward successful mission accomplishment.

I will hold faith with those Flight Nurses who have preceded me, and endeavor to bring honor and respect to the Air Force Nurse Corps.

This I will do. I will not falter in peace or in war.

== Badges ==
=== USAF Flight Nurse ===
Official Flight Nurse badges worn on uniforms of those in the United States Air Force

Approved in 1959, includes the symbols found in the official Nurse Corps Badges with the addition of wings on either side.

=== USAF Nurse ===
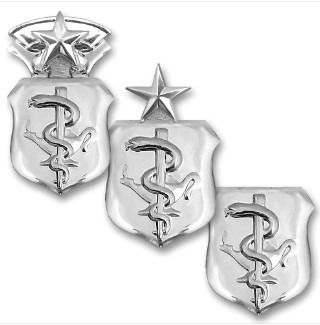
Official Nurse Corps badges worn on uniforms of those in the United States Air Force

Authorized on 6 July 1959, for all nurses serving in the USAF for wear on uniforms.

== See also ==
- United States Army Nurse Corps
- United States Navy Nurse Corps
