= Elsie Chin Yuen Seetoo =

United States Army Nurse (born 1918)

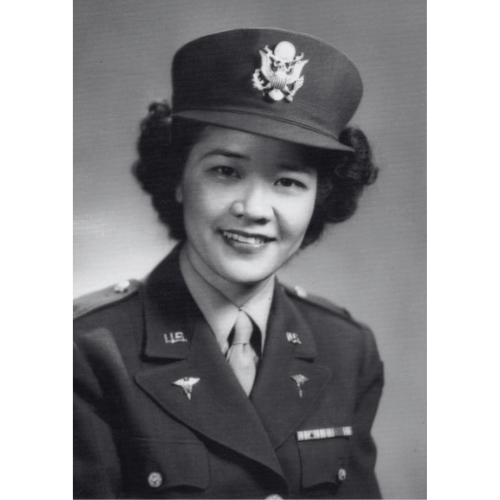
- 1944 Army photograph of 1st Lt. Elsie Chin
- Born: Elsie Chin; September 14, 1918 (age 108); Stockton, California, U.S.
- Education: Queen Mary Hospital School of Nursing; Woman's College of the University of North Carolina
- Spouses: Joseph Yuen (m. 1946; died 1981); Ben Seetoo (m. 1983; died 2001)
- Children: 4
- Military career
- Allegiance: United States
- Branch: United States Army Nurse Corps
- Service years: 1944–1946
- Rank: First Lieutenant
- War: World War II: Battle of Hong Kong; Second Sino-Japanese War
- Awards: Congressional Gold Medal; See list
- Other work: Nurse, Chinese Red Cross Medical Relief Corps; Medical translator, National Institutes of Health; Technical publications writer, Naval Medical Center Bethesda

Elsie Chin Yuen Seetoo (born September 14, 1918) is a Chinese-American nurse, medical translator, and World War II veteran best known for her service as a first lieutenant in the United States Army Nurse Corps. She was the first Chinese-American to serve in the Corps. In 2020, she received the Congressional Gold Medal.

== Early life and education ==
Elsie Chin was born on September 14, 1918, in Stockton, California, the daughter of Chinese immigrants who operated an import-export grocery business. As a child, she attended local public schools, went to Chinese school at night, and was an active Camp Fire Girl. In 1931, amid the Great Depression, her family returned to Xinhui in Guangdong Province, China. There, she attended Pooi To Middle School in Guangzhou for six years. In October 1938, she began nursing training at Queen Mary Hospital School of Nursing in British Hong Kong.

== World War II service ==
Following the Japanese invasion of Hong Kong on December 8, 1941, Seetoo immediately became a wartime hospital nurse, tending to the casualties and wounded soldiers of the Japanese attack, as she was still continuing her studies at Queen Mary Hospital. On December 10, 1941, she received a certificate from the hospital as a Registered Nurse. While working at Queen Mary Hospital, Seetoo took care of American journalist Agnes Smedley, who told her about the Chinese Red Cross Medical Relief Corps.

After Hong Kong fell to Japanese control and Queen Mary Hospital became a Japanese-run military hospital, Seetoo escaped to mainland China, despite her family's initial objections. Because medical personnel were not permitted to leave Japanese-occupied Hong Kong at the time, she disguised herself as a peasant, and traveled by boat, truck, and foot (including walking over 700 miles) to reach Free China.

After reaching Guiyang in April 1942, Seetoo met Robert Lim, director of the Chinese Red Cross Medical Relief Corps, who offered her a position. She began working in the operating room of a Red Cross-affiliated hospital and later trained medical orderlies. In late 1942, she was stationed at Camp Ramgarh, India, to train Chinese soldiers in first aid and medical procedures. During her time there, she wrote that "life during the past four months in India has hardened me quite a bit."

On June 17, 1944, Seetoo joined the U.S. Army Nurse Corps, becoming the first Chinese-American nurse to do so. She was commissioned as a First Lieutenant and served with the 14th Air Force, Air Service Command. In order to receive her commission, she was required to take an oath of allegiance and oath of renunciation because she had served with the Chinese Red Cross (despite having been born in the United States). Her assignments included the 95th Station Hospital in Kunming and Chengdu, the 172nd General Hospital in Shanghai, and Letterman General Hospital in San Francisco. She served until her discharge in May 1946.

== Later life ==
After the war, Seetoo returned to the United States and pursued higher education. Using the G.I. Bill, she graduated in 1948 with a Bachelor of Science in Nursing from the Woman's College of the University of North Carolina. After graduation in 1948, Seetoo applied for a position with the Central Intelligence Agency, and while she passed the exam, she did not pass their background investigation due to her family ties in China. Seetoo attributed this to the second "Red Scare" in the United States which had already begun by that time.

After graduation, Seetoo briefly worked as a nurse at George Washington University Hospital in Washington, D.C. She later worked as a translator of Chinese medical literature and as a technical publications writer and editor at the Naval Medical Center, the U.S. Joint Publications and Research Service, and the National Institutes of Health. The most notable of her English translations is perhaps A Barefoot Doctor’s Manual, which aided in the integration of Western and traditional Chinese medicine.

During the Vietnam War, while working as a technical publications writer and editor with the Naval Medical Center, she helped developed materials for medical corpsmen who were going to Southeast Asia, with an emphasis on information about tropical diseases, native plants and foods, x-ray technologies, and nuclear medicine. She retired in the mid-1980s.

== Personal life ==
Seetoo married Joseph Yuen, with whom she had four children. After his death in 1981, she married Ben Seetoo, who died in 2001. She has celebrated her centennial and resides in a life-care community near Washington, D.C. She has four children, seven grandchildren, and eight great-grandchildren.

== Awards and honors ==
Congressional Gold Medal which was awarded to Seetoo. A WWII nurse is depicted on the far right of the medal's front side.

Seetoo is the recipient of various awards and honors.

- For her service in World War II, Seetoo received the World War II Victory Medal and Asiatic-Pacific Campaign Medal.
- In 2005, Seetoo was interviewed for a three hour oral history for the Betty H. Carter Women Veterans Historical Project.
- On December 20, 2018, President Donald Trump signed into law the Chinese-American World War II Veteran Congressional Gold Medal Act, which had been passed unanimously by Congress. On December 9, 2020, in a ceremony hosted by Speaker of the House Nancy Pelosi, Seetoo was among the group of Chinese-American veterans honored with the Congressional Gold Medal for their service during World War II. During the ceremony, she expressed hope that their perseverance would "inspire our young people to serve this wonderful country."
- In 2022, Seetoo was inducted into the San Francisco State University APIA Wall of Fame.
- In 2022, Seetoo was recognized as "Veteran of the Day" by the U.S. Department of Veterans Affairs.
- The "Elsie Chin Yuen Seetoo Collection" is in the permanent archives of the UNCG University Libraries.
