= Dita Hopkins Kinney =

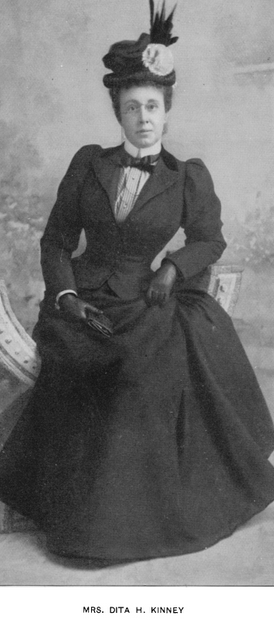
- Born: September 13, 1855; New York City, U.S.
- Died: April 16, 1921 (aged 65); Bangor, Maine, U.S.
- Education: Massachusetts General Hospital
- Occupations: Nurse and superintendent/president
- Spouse: Mark Kinney

Dita Hopkins Kinney (September 13, 1855 – April 16, 1921) was the first superintendent of the United States Army Nurse Corps, serving from 1901 to 1909.

== Early life ==
Dita Hopkins was born in New York City and raised in California, the daughter of C. T. Hopkins and Myra Burnett Hopkins. She attended Mills College. As a young widow, she trained as a nurse at Massachusetts General Hospital.

== Career ==
Kinney worked as a nurse in Massachusetts, Minnesota, and California, before she became an army nurse in 1898. She was first assigned to the hospital at the Presidio of San Francisco. She also worked with tubercular patients at Fort Bayard, New Mexico. In 1901, she became superintendent of the United States Army Nursing Corps. In that year, she was called "perhaps the most conspicuous woman in the nursing profession today". Her work included lecture and inspection tours of army hospitals in the United States and abroad. She resigned the superintendency in 1909.

Kinney left active nursing for health reasons in 1914, but taught American Red Cross nurses during World War I.

== Personal life ==
Dita Hopkins married Mark Kinney in 1874, and had one son before she was widowed in 1878. She died in 1921, aged 65 years, in Bangor, Maine.
