= Florence A. Blanchfield =

United States Army officer

Florence Aby Blanchfield
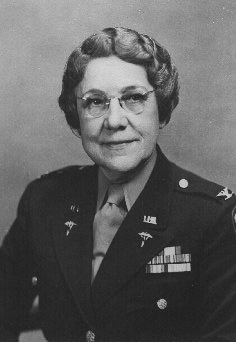
- Colonel Florence A. Blanchfield
- Born: April 1, 1884; Shepherdstown, West Virginia, U.S.
- Died: May 12, 1971 (aged 87); Washington, D.C., U.S.
- Military career
- Allegiance: United States of America
- Branch: United States Army
- Rank: Colonel
- Commands: Superintendent of the Army Nurse Corps
- Conflicts: World War I World War II
- Awards: Distinguished Service Medal; Florence Nightingale Medal

Florence Aby Blanchfield (April 1, 1884 in Shepherdstown, West Virginia – May 12, 1971 in Washington, D.C.) was a United States Army Colonel and superintendent of the Army Nursing Corps, from 1943 to 1947. She was awarded the Distinguished Service Medal in 1945, and the Florence Nightingale Medal by the International Red Cross in 1951. In 1947 Blanchfield became the first woman to receive a military commission in the regular army.

== Early life ==
Florence Aby Blanchfield was born in Shepherdstown, West Virginia, the fourth of eight children of Mary Louvenia (née Anderson), a nurse, and Joseph Plunkett Blanchfield, a mason and stonecutter. She grew up in Oranda, Virginia, attending public school until 1898, when she attended the private Oranda Institute. In addition to having a mother who was a nurse, Blanchfield's two sisters also became nurses, and her maternal grandfather and an uncle were physicians.

She graduated from Southside Hospital Training School in 1906. She then studied with Howard Atwood Kelly at Johns Hopkins Hospital.

== Career ==
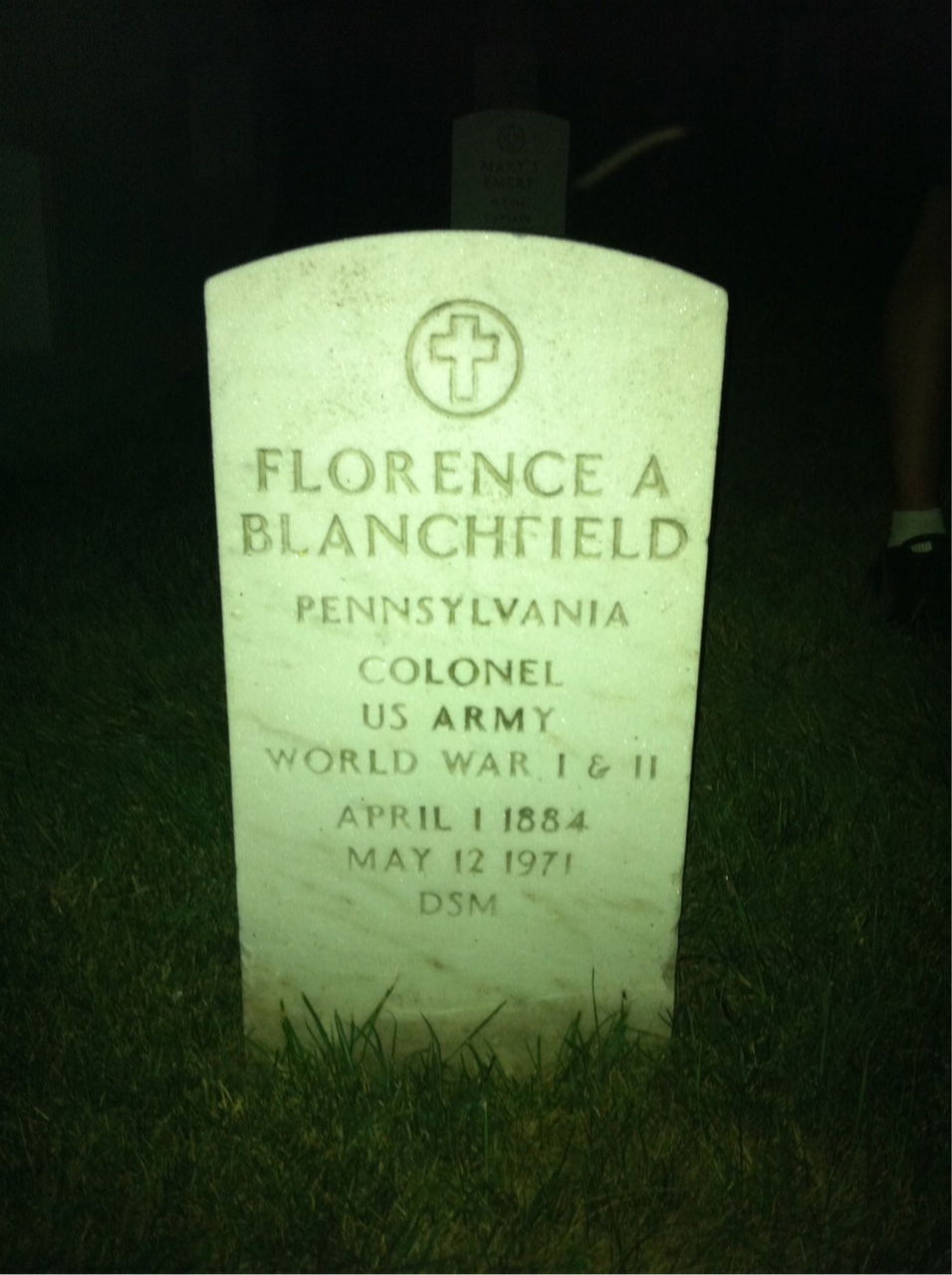
Blanchfield's grave at Arlington National Cemetery

Blanchfield was operating room supervisor at Southside Hospital and Montefiore Hospital, Pittsburgh, Pennsylvania. In 1909, she was superintendent of a training school at Suburban General Hospital, in Bellevue, Pennsylvania. In 1913, she worked as an operating room nurse and an anesthetist at the Ancon Hospital in the Panama Canal Zone.

During World War I, she enlisted in the US Army Nurse Corps (ANC), and served as acting chief nurse, in Angers, and Coëtquidan, France, from August 1917 to January 1919. She was assigned to many military hospitals. She returned to civilian life for a period after the end of the War, but was drawn back to active service.

In 1935, she was assigned to Washington D.C. to the office of the superintendent, for personnel matters in the corps. She became assistant superintendent in 1939, acting superintendent in 1942, and served as superintendent from 1 June 1943 until September 1947. She was instrumental in gaining full rank for nurses, by the Army and Navy Nurse Corps Law of April 16, 1947. This was preceded by temporary full commissioned status granted in 1944. During World War II, she also saw the rapid growth of the ANC from several hundred members to more than 50,000. In 1947 she became the first woman to receive a military commission in the regular army.

For her accomplishments on behalf of the ANC, she was awarded the Distinguished Service Medal in 1945. Blanchfield was also awarded the Florence Nightingale Medal by the International Red Cross (1951) and West Virginia's Distinguished Service Medal (1963).

She is buried in Arlington National Cemetery in section 21, site 641.

== Decorations ==
Colonel Blanchfield's ribbon bar included:

Distinguished Service Medal		World War I Victory Medal
American Defense Service Medal	American Campaign Medal	World War II Victory Medal

== Legacy ==
Colonel Florence A. Blanchfield Army Community Hospital at Fort Campbell, Kentucky was named for her in 1982.
