= Jane Delano =

Founder of the American Red Cross Nursing Service (1862–1919)

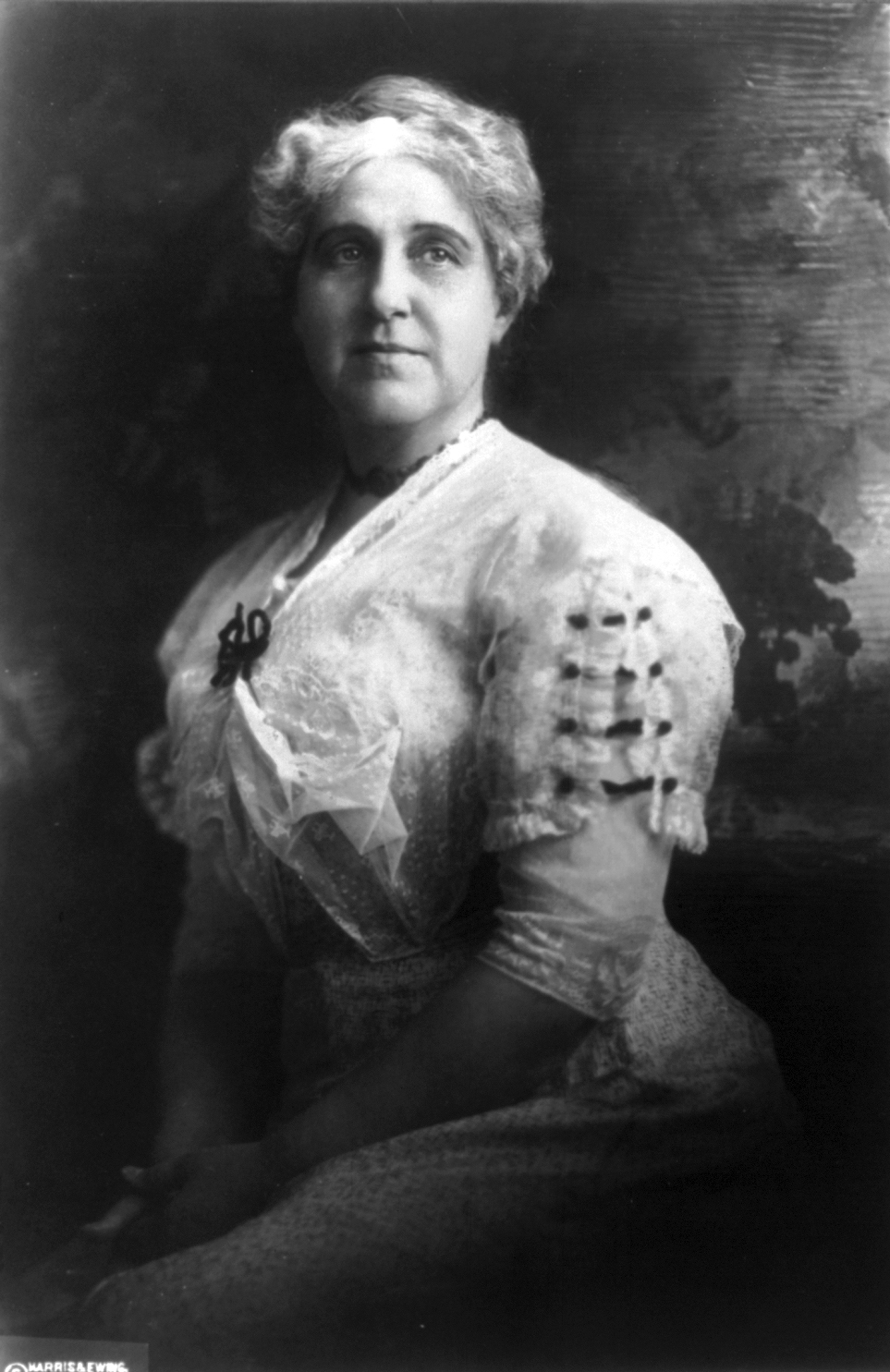
- Born: March 12, 1862; Montour Falls, New York, US
- Died: April 15, 1919 (aged 57); Savenay, Loire-Atlantique, France
- Resting place: Arlington National Cemetery
- Occupation: Nurse

Jane Arminda Delano (March 12, 1862 in Montour Falls, New York – April 15, 1919 in Savenay, Loire-Atlantique, France) was a nurse and founder of the American Red Cross Nursing Service.

== Personal life ==
A descendant of one of the first settlers to America, Philippe de la Noye (Delano) (1602–1681) Jane Delano attended Cook Academy, a Baptist boarding school in her hometown then studied nursing at the Bellevue Hospital School of Nursing in New York City, where she graduated in 1886.

== Professional life ==
Delano started work in 1888 at a Jacksonville, Florida, hospital treating victims of a yellow fever epidemic. There, she demonstrated her superior executive and administrative skills and developed innovative nursing procedures for the patients under her care. Leaving Florida, Jane Delano then spent three years nursing typhoid patients at a copper mine in Bisbee, Arizona until accepting an appointment as the Superintendent of Nurses at University Hospital in Philadelphia, Pennsylvania.

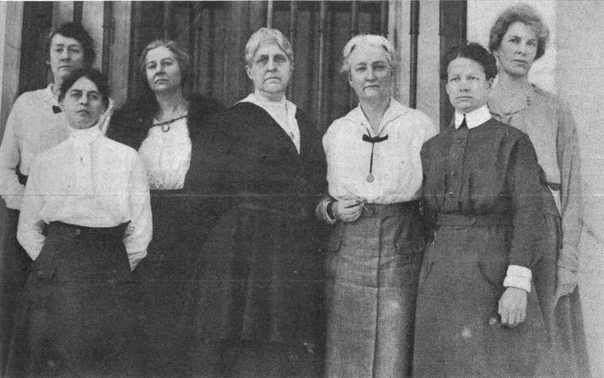
Chief Executives of the American Red Cross Department of Nursing (1918). Delano is in the center.

In 1898, during the Spanish–American War, Jane Delano became a member of the New York Chapter of the American Red Cross and served as the secretary for the enrollment of nurses. In 1902 she returned to Bellevue Hospital in New York City as the director of the Training School for Nurses where she remained until 1909 when she was made Superintendent of the United States Army Nurse Corps. During this time, her invaluable contributions to her profession resulted in her being named president of the American Nurses Association and chair of the National Committee of the Red Cross Nursing Service.

A leading pioneer of the modern nursing profession, Delano almost single-handedly created American Red Cross Nursing when she united the work of the American Nurses Association, the Army Nurse Corps, and the American Red Cross. Through her efforts, emergency response teams were organized for disaster relief and over 8,000 registered nurses were trained and ready for duty by the time the United States entered World War I. During the course of the War, more than 20,000 of her nurses played vital roles with the United States military. For her contributions during the war she was awarded the Distinguished Service Medal by the Secretary of the Army.

== Death ==
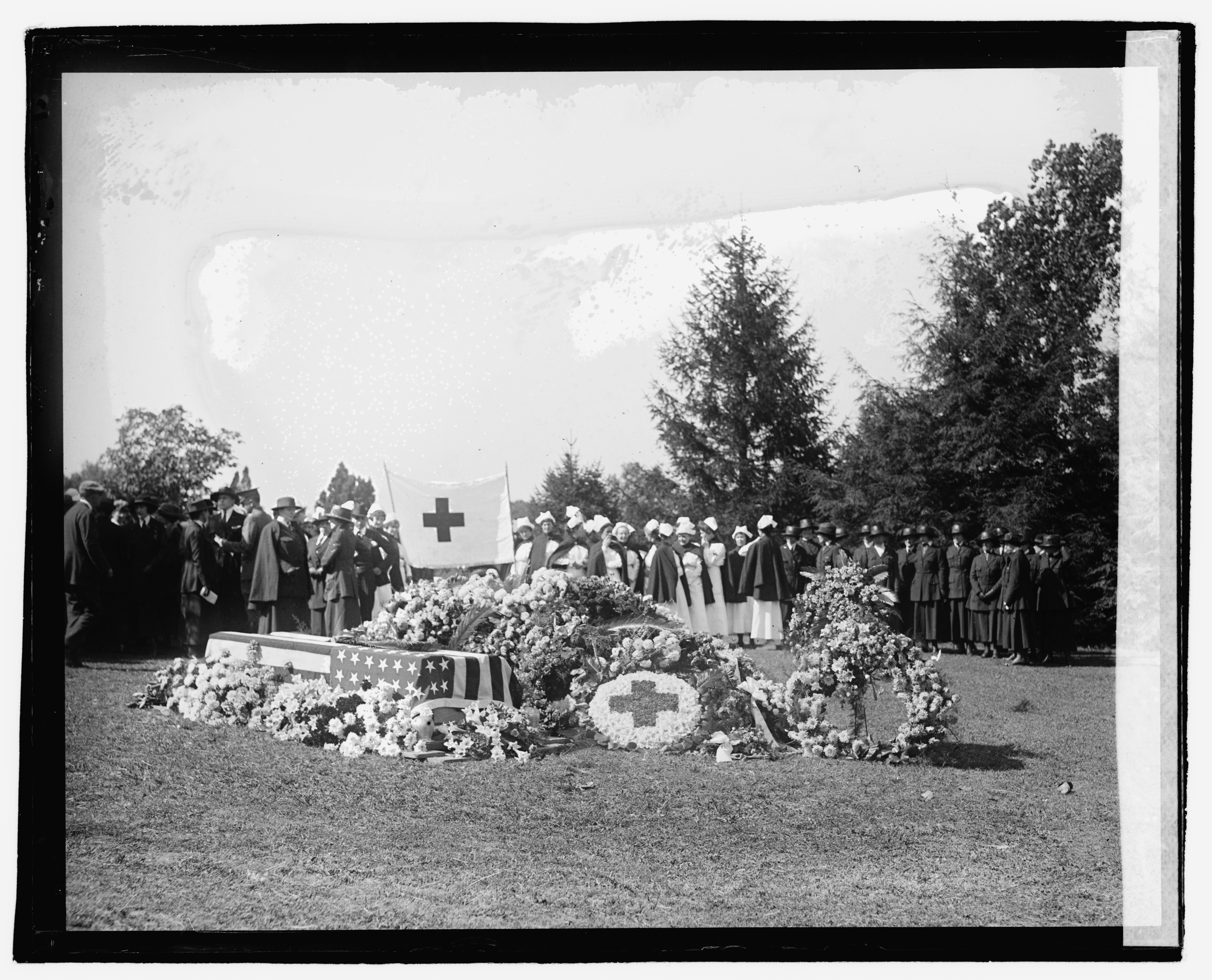
Delano reburial, 1920, Arlington National Cemetery

Jane Delano died in France while on a Red Cross mission, expiring at Base Hospital No. 8 in Savenay of Loire-Inferieure, and was interred in a cemetery in the Loire Valley. The mission was to participate in and represent the American Red Cross at the preliminary conference of Red Cross workers and health experts of the world being held at Cannes. Awarded the Distinguished Service Medal posthumously, following her 1919 death her remains were brought back to the United States by the Army Quartermaster Corps and re-interred at Arlington National Cemetery. At the top of the hill overlooking the nurses section is a bronze memorial to Jane Delano and the 296 nurses who lost their lives during World War I. Military funeral services, prior to burial, were held Saturday, September 18, 1920. A number of representatives of the American Red Cross, Army officers of the Army Medical Corps, and a delegation of uniformed nurses attended the funeral. A detachment of Army troops and a military band from Fort Myers acted as an escort for the body when it was taken to the grave from the vault at Arlington Cemetery. All present stood silent as "taps" was given over the grave of Miss Delano.

Delano has been honored many times for her dedication to humanity. She was named to the American Nurses Association Hall of Fame and at Schuyler County Hospital in Dix, New York there is a Jane Delano Memorial with a display of personal items including a number of her awards and medals. In 1990, the National Nursing Advisory Committee formed the "Jane Delano Society" to ensure active nursing involvement at all levels of the Red Cross and to preserve artifacts that document the history of Red Cross nursing.

== Published works ==
- Delano, Jane A.; Isabel McIsaac (1913). American Red Cross Textbook on Elementary Hygiene and Home. Philadelphia: P. Blakiston's Son & Co.
