= United States Army Nurse Corps =

Nursing service of the U.S. Army

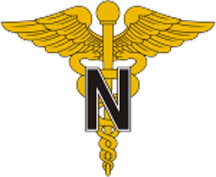
- Army Nurse Corps branch insignia
- Active: 1901 – present day
- Country: United States
- Branch: United States Army
- Motto: Embrace the past – Engage the present – Envision the future

The United States Army Nurse Corps (USANC) was formally established by the U.S. Congress in 1901. It is one of the six medical special branches (or "corps") of officers which – along with medical enlisted soldiers – comprise the Army Medical Department (AMEDD). The ANC is the nursing service for the U.S. Army and provides nursing staff in support of the Department of Defense medical plans. The ANC is composed entirely of Registered Nurses (RNs) and Advanced Practice Registered Nurses (APRN).

== Mission ==
The USANC states its mission is "To provide responsive, innovative, and evidence-based nursing care integrated on the Army Medicine Team to enhance readiness, preserve life and function, and promote health and wellness for all those entrusted to our care."

== Creed ==
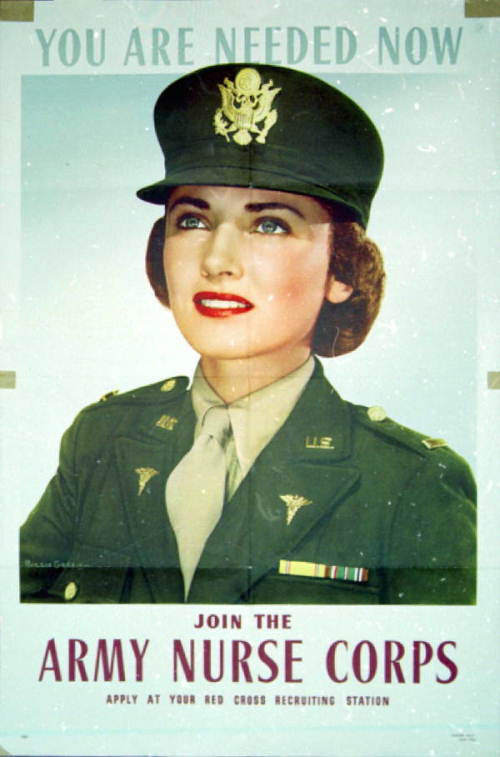
World War II Army Nurse Corps recruiting poster

The Army Nursing Corps Creed was written by Lt. Col. Leigh McGraw in December 2009:

I am a member of the Army Nursing Corps.

My patients depend on me and trust me to provide compassionate and proficient care always. I nurture the most helpless and vulnerable and offer courage and hope to those in despair. I protect the dignity of every individual put in my charge.

I tend to physical and psychological wounds of our warriors and support the health, safety, and welfare of every retired Veteran. I am an advocate for family members who support and sustain their Soldiers during times of War. It is a privilege to care for each of these individuals and I will always strive to be attentive and respectful of their needs and honor their uniquely divine human spirit.

We are the Army Nursing Corps.

We honor our professional practice standards and live the Soldier values. We believe strength and resilience in difficult times are the cornerstone of Army Nursing. We embrace the diversity of our team and implicitly understand that we must maintain a unified, authentically positive culture and support each other's physical, social, and environmental well-being. We have a collective responsibility to mentor and foster the professional growth of our newest Team members so they may mentor those who follow.

We remember those nursing professionals who came before us and honor their legacy, determination, and sacrifice. We are fundamentally committed to providing exceptional care to past, present, and future generations who bravely defend and protect our Nation.

== Qualifications ==
To qualify for the Army Nurse Corps, an applicant needs a Bachelor of Science in Nursing (BSN) from an accredited program (Active and Reserve). AR 135-100, AR 135-101, AR 601-100, and applicable ANC circulars in the DA Circular 601-FY-X series list qualifications for entry.

The ANC consists entirely of commissioned officers. Nurses who wish to serve as Army Nurses are required to hold an unrestricted Registered Nurse (RN) license prior to receiving a commission.

== Leadership ==
The Chief of the Army Nurse Corps and the FORSCOM Command Surgeon is BG James D. Burk, while the Deputy Chief is COL Jodelle Schroeder.

== Specialties ==
Areas of concentration (AOC)

Public Health Nurse – 66B

Psychiatric-Mental Health Nurse – 66C

Peri-Operative Nurse – 66E

Certified Registered Nurse Anesthetist (CRNA) – 66F

Obstetrics-Gynecologic Nurse – 66G

Medical-Surgical Nursing – 66H

Generalist Nurse – 66N; this is used to designate positions on organizational documents but is not held by the individual.

Family Nurse Practitioner (FNP) – 66P

Additional Skill Identifiers (ASIs); designate additional areas of expertise or experience and are in addition to a basic nursing specialty.

7T – Clinical Nurse Specialist (CNS)

8A – Critical Care Nurse (ASI to be deleted and converted to the AOC 66S)

8D – Nurse Midwife (Only used in conjunction with AOC 66G)

M5 – Emergency Nurse (ASI to be deleted and converted to the AOC 66T)

Stat

M8 – Psychiatric Nurse Practitioner (Only used in conjunction with AOC 66C)

M9 – Nurse Case Manager

N1 – Aviation Medicine Nurse Practitioner (Only used in conjunction with AOC 66P)

== History ==
=== Pre-1901 ===
Nurses served in Washington's Army during the Revolutionary War. Although the women who tended the sick and wounded during the Revolutionary War were not nurses as they are known in the modern sense, they blazed the trail for later generations. In 1873, civilian hospitals in America began operating as recognized schools of nursing.

After the Revolutionary War, Congress drastically reduced the size of the medical service. Patient care was performed by soldiers detailed from the companies. There was no centralized medical direction by a formally organized medical department until the War of 1812. The Army Medical Department was re-established by Congress under the direction of a Surgeon General, Dr. Joseph Lovell. The Army Reorganization Act of 1818 marked the beginning of the modem Medical Department of the United States Army.

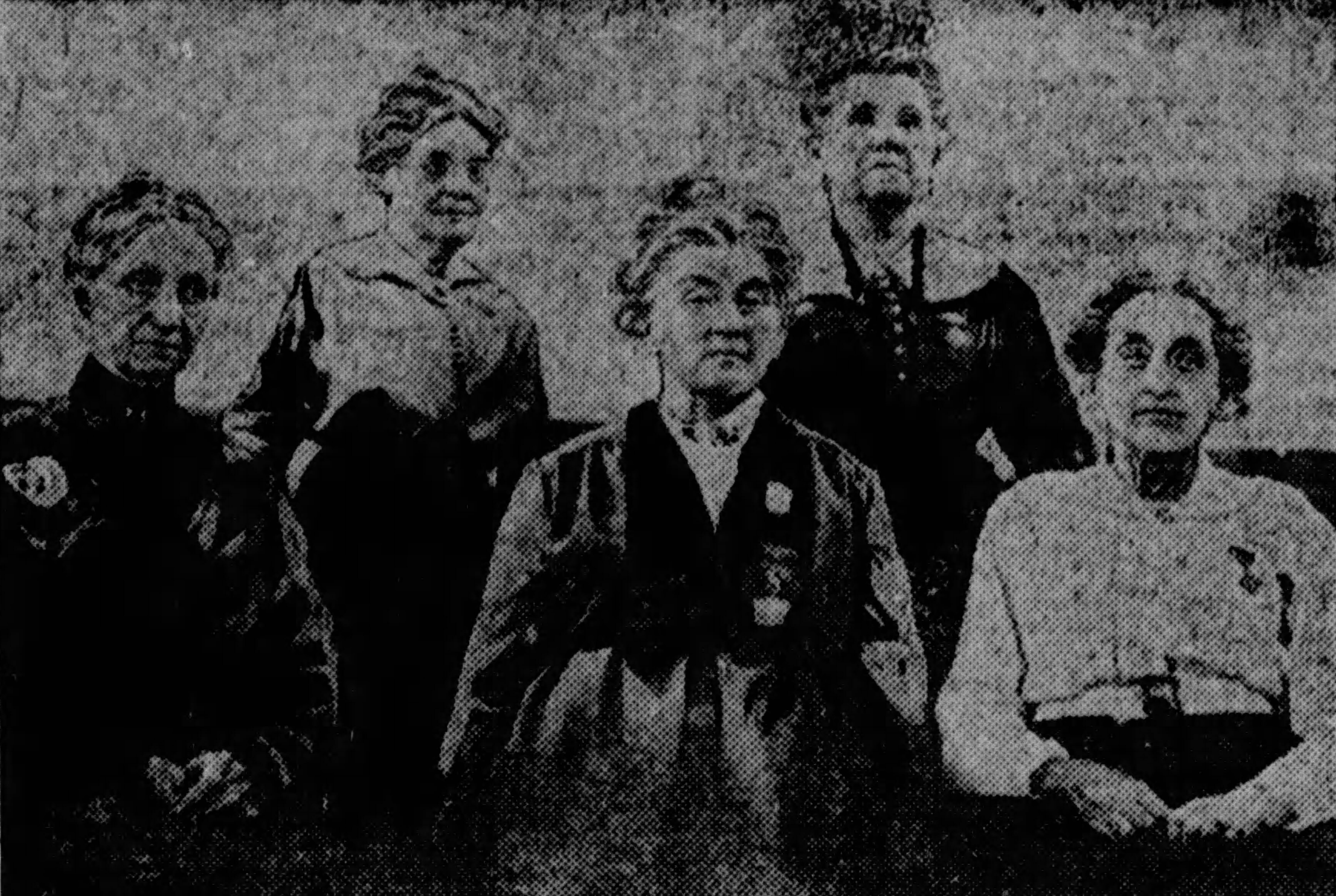
Five American Civil War nurses at 1916 Massachusetts encampment; Helen E. Smith, Susan C. Mills, Margaret Hamilton, Mary E. Smith, and Lovisa Tyson.

Two months after the Civil War began on 12 April 1861, the Secretary of War Simon Cameron appointed Dorothea Lynde Dix as superintendent of women nurses for the Union Army. Some of the women, before reporting for assignment, received a short course in nursing under the direction of Dr. Elizabeth Blackwell, the first woman to receive a medical degree in the United States.

Some of the nurses who worked in the Union hospitals were not on the Army payroll, but were sponsored by the United States Sanitary Commission or by volunteer agencies. Their work was largely limited to preparing diets, supervising the distribution of supplies furnished by volunteer groups, and housekeeping details.

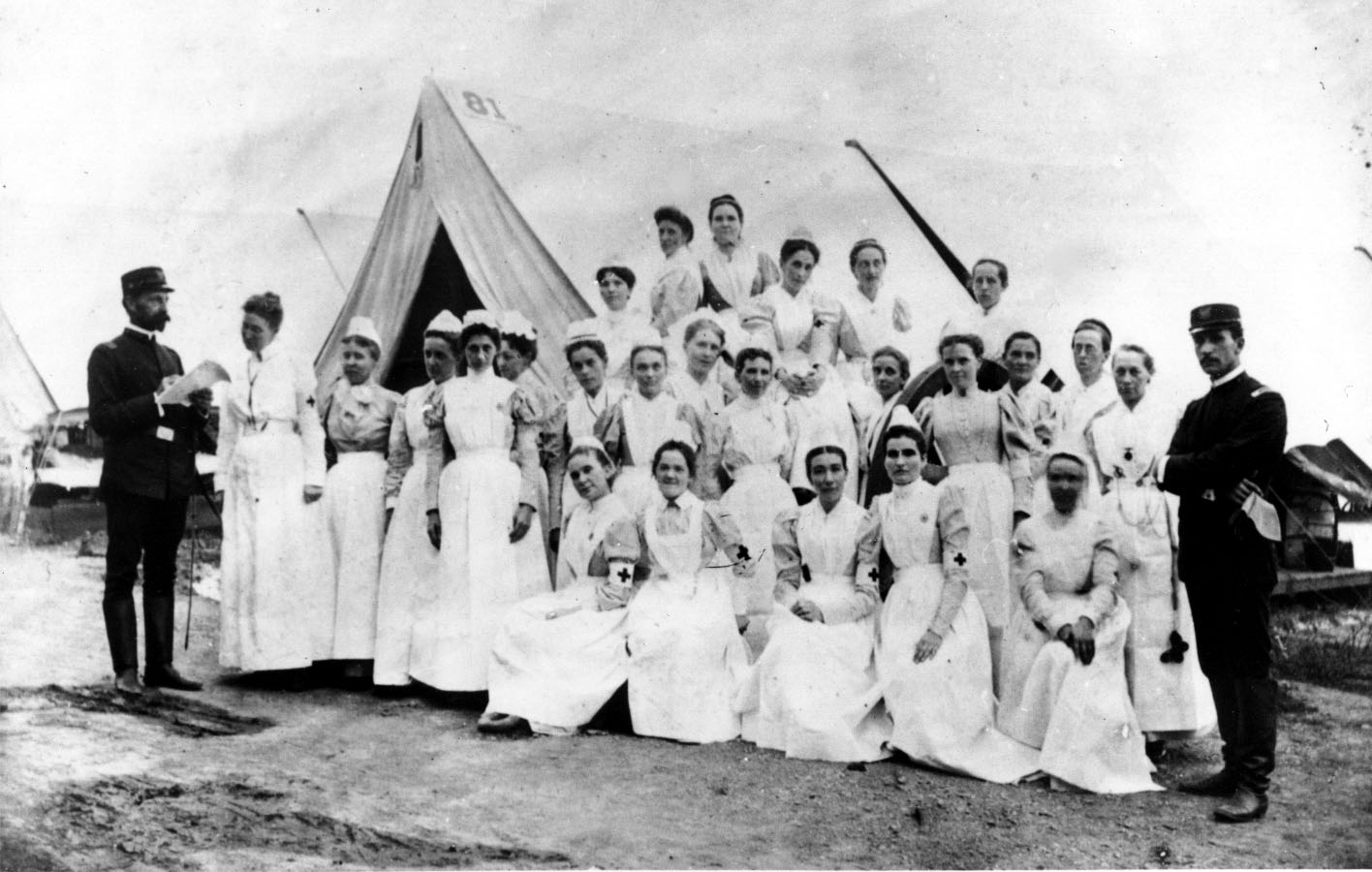
Nurses during the American Civil War

During the 1898 Spanish–American War, the Army hired female civilian nurses to help with the wounded. Dr. Anita Newcomb McGee was appointed Acting Assistant Surgeon in the U.S. Army and served as director of the DAR Hospital Corps. After the war ended, McGee pursued the establishment of a permanent nurse corps. She wrote the section of the Army Reorganization Act legislation pertaining to nursing and is now known as the founder of the Army Nurse Corps. In all, more than 1,500 women nurses worked as contract nurses during that 1898 conflict.

Race and sex played central roles. The ANC was for white women only and fought hard to exclude or minimize the number of black women until 1947. They excluded all men until the Korean War, when male doctors began to emphasize the need for nurses on the front lines, and this meant male nurses.

=== 1901–1917 ===
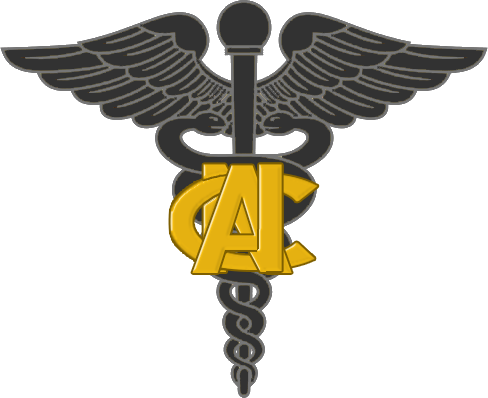
WWI Army Nurses Corps Insignia

The Army Nurse Corps became a permanent corps of the Medical Department under the Army Reorganization Act (31 Stat. 753) passed by Congress on 2 February 1901.

Professionalization was a dominant theme during the Progressive Era, because it valued expertise and hierarchy over ad-hoc volunteering in the name of civic duty. The Army Nurse Corps (female) became a permanent corps of the Medical Department under the Army Reorganization Act (31 Stat. 753) on 2 February 1901. Nurses were appointed in the Regular Army for a three-year period, although nurses were not actually commissioned as officers in the Regular Army until forty-six years later-on 16 April 1947. Dita H. Kinney, was officially appointed the first Superintendent of the Corps on 15 March 1901. Kinney served as superintendent until she resigned on 31 July 1909.

The number of nurses on active duty hovered around 100 in the years after the creation of the corps, with the two largest groups serving at the general hospital at the Presidio in San Francisco and at the First Reserve Hospital in Manila.

=== World War I ===
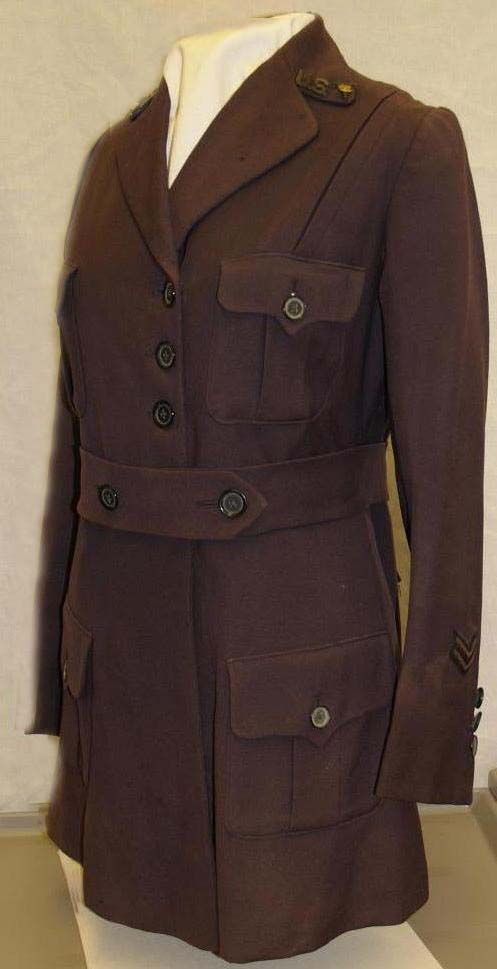
1917 Army Nurse Corps Uniform Coat

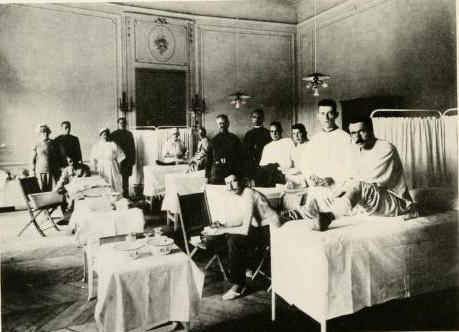
Nurses, personnel, and patients of United States Base Hospital 32 in Contrexeville, France in 1918.

In World War I (American participation from 1917–18), the military recruited 20,000 registered nurses (all women) for military and navy duty in 58 military hospitals. They helped staff 47 ambulance companies that operated on the Western Front. More than 10,000 served overseas, while 5,400 nurses enrolled in the Army's new School of Nursing. Key decisions were made by Jane Delano, director of the Red Cross Nursing Service, Mary Adelaide Nutting, president of the American Federation of Nurses, and Annie Goodrich, dean of the Army School of Nursing.

=== Interwar period ===
Demobilization reduced the two corps to skeleton units designed to be expanded should a new war take place. Eligibility at this time included being female, white, unmarried, a volunteer, and a graduate from a civilian nursing school.

In 1920, the Army Reorganization Act granted Army nurses relative rank, with their relative standing in the army corresponding to the standing of commissioned officers, although the nurses themselves were not commissioned officers. The “assimilated ranks” of major, lieutenant, and captain were authorized. Staff nurses were appointed as second lieutenants, the superintendent was appointed as a major, the assistant superintendent and directors were captains, and chief nurses were first lieutenants. The nurses were also authorized to wear insignia by the Act.

Flikke remained in the Army after the war. After 12 years at Walter Reed Army Hospital in Washington, D.C., she was promoted to captain and became the Assistant Superintendent of Nurses. She succeeded in creating new billets for occupational therapists and dieticians. Flikke became Superintendent, with the rank of Major, in 1938.

=== World War II ===
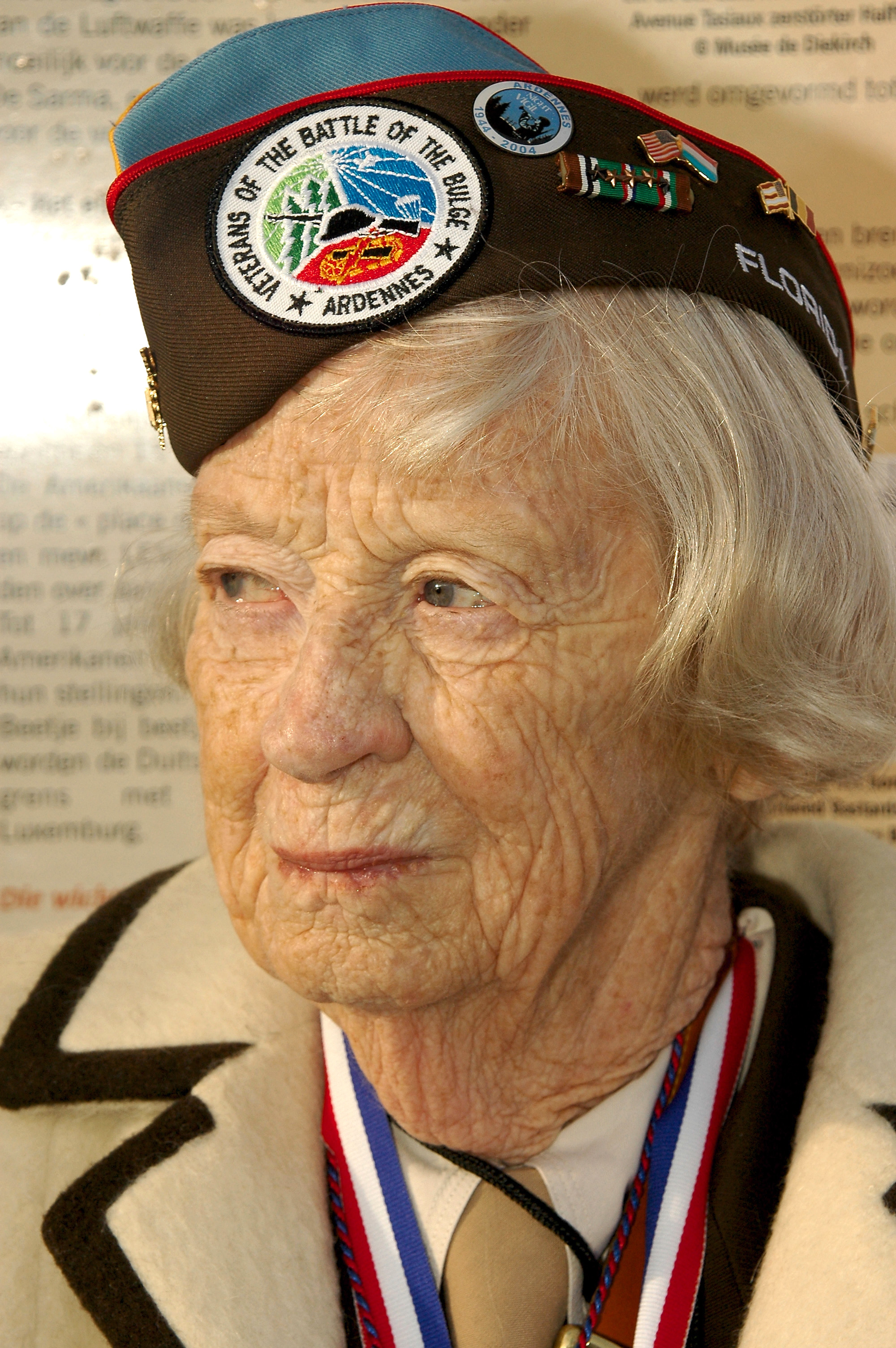
WWII Army Nurse LT Katherine Flynn Nolan, a veteran of the Battle of the Bulge, Bastogne, Belgium (18 December 2004).

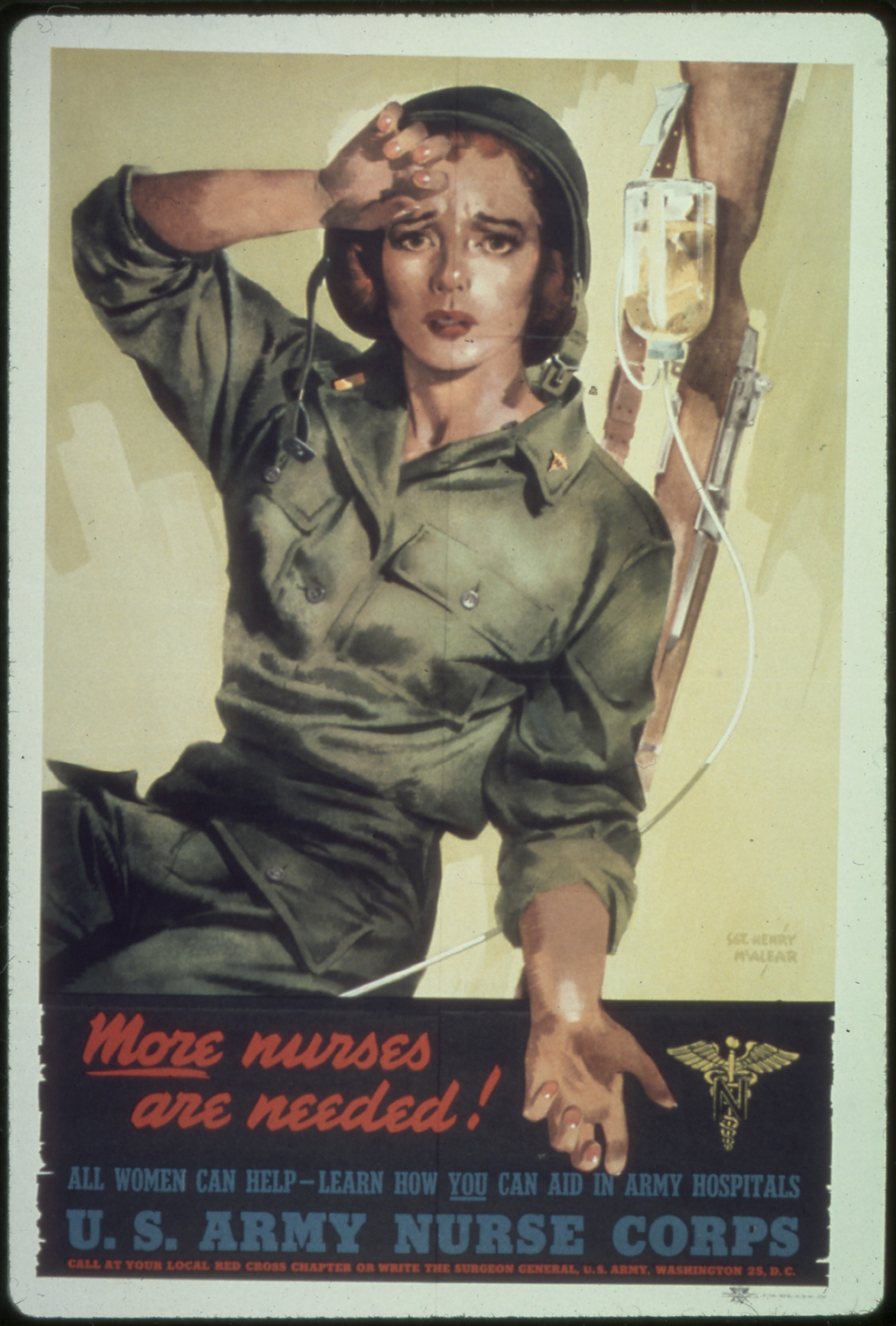
WW2-era recruitment poster

At the start of the war in December 1941, there were fewer than 1,000 nurses in the Army Nurse Corps and 700 in the Navy Nurse Corps. All were women.

Colonel Flikke's small headquarters in 1942, though it contained only 4 officers and 25 civilians, supervised the vast wartime expansion of nurses, in cooperation with the Red Cross. She only took unmarried women aged 22–30 who had their RN training from civilian schools. These nurses were commissioned for a term that lasted the duration of the war plus six months, but they were discharged if they married or became pregnant.

Due to the Japanese attack on Pearl Harbor on 7 December 1941, the United States entered the Pacific part of World War II. Along with this military effort was the work of the Flying Tigers in Kunming, China, under Claire Chennault. Nurses were thus needed in China to serve the U.S. Army. These nurses were recruited among the Chinese nurses residing in China, particularly the English-speaking nurses who fled Hong Kong (a British colony) to free China due to the Japanese invasion of Hong Kong on 8 December 1941. The Hong Kong nurses were trained by the Department of Medical Services (directed by Dr. Percy Selwyn Selwyn-Clarke) of the Government of Hong Kong. They took up Nursing positions at the Flying Tigers (Rebecca Chan Chung 鍾陳可慰, Daisy Pui-Ying Chan 陳培英), U.S. Army (Rebecca Chan Chung 鍾陳可慰, Daisy Chan 陳培英, Cynthia Chan 陳靜渝), Chinese Red Cross (Elsie Chin Yuen Seetoo, Irene Yu 余秀芬) and China National Aviation Corporation (Rebecca Chan Chung 鍾陳可慰, Irene Yu 余秀芬). Cynthia Chan 陳靜渝 is the elder sister of Anna Chan 陳香梅 (Mrs. Chennault).

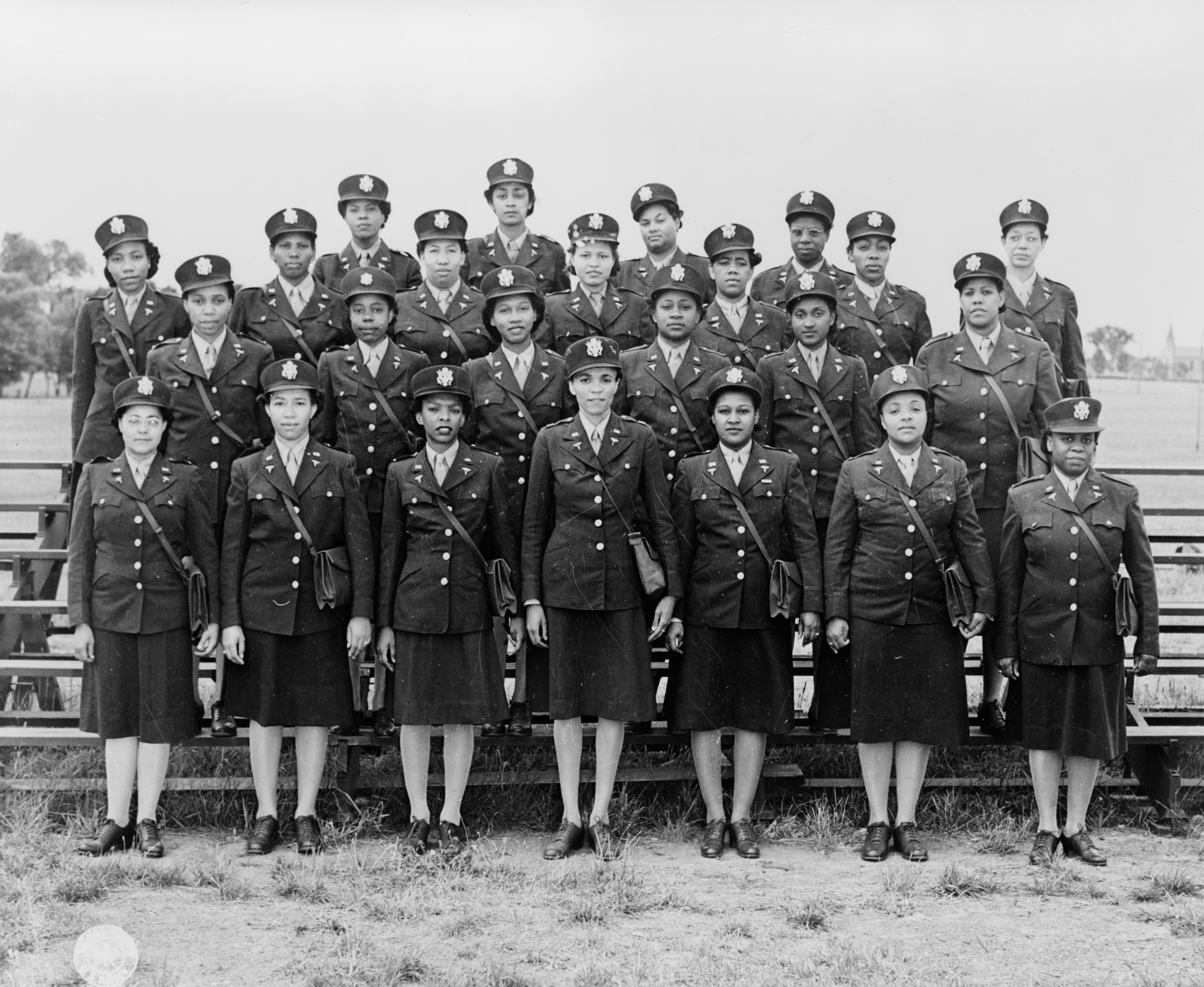
First black nurses landed in England in 1944, led by Captain Mary L. Petty

Only a few African American nurses were admitted to the Army Nurse Corps. Mabel Keaton Staupers, who worked for the National Association of Colored Graduate Nurses with help from Eleanor Roosevelt, pressured the Army to admit African American nurses in 1941. The first black nurse admitted to the program was Della H. Raney who was commissioned as a second lieutenant in April 1941. The limit on black nurses was 48 in 1941 and they were mostly segregated from white nurses and soldiers. In 1943, the Army set a limit on black nurses to 160. That same year, the first African American medical unit, the 25th Station Hospital Unit, was deployed overseas to Liberia. Later, nurses were deployed to Burma, where they treated black soldiers. African American nurses also served in China, Australia, New Guinea, the Philippines, England and the US where they treated prisoners of war. By the end of the war, there were 476 serving in the corps.

On 26 February 1944 Congress passed a bill that granted Army and Navy Nurses actual military rank, approved for the duration of the war plus 6 months.

The Cadet Nurse Corps was created because of a nationwide shortage of nurses. With over 8 million soldiers, sailors, and airmen, the needs were more than double those of World War I. Hundreds of new military hospitals were constructed for the expected flow of casualties. Fearing a massive wave of combat casualties once Japan was invaded in late 1945, President Franklin D. Roosevelt called on Congress early in 1945 for permission to draft nurses. However, with the rapid collapse of Germany early in 1945, and the limitation of the war in the Pacific to a few islands, the draft was not needed and was never enacted.

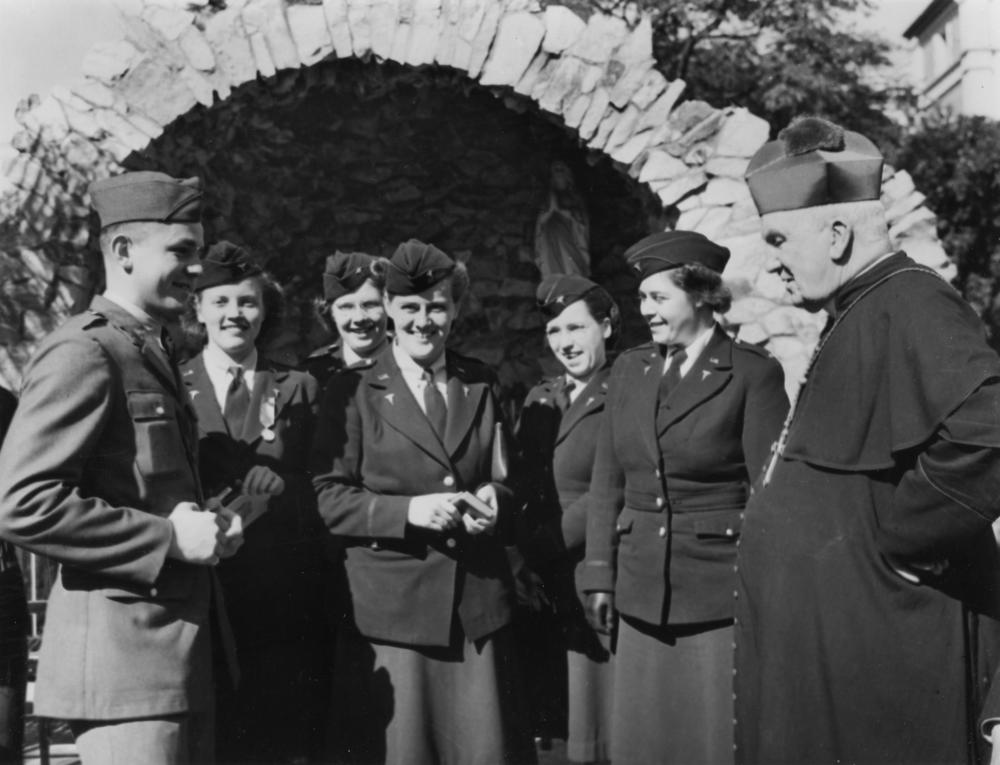
Archbishop James Duhig meeting with United States Army nurses ca. 1944 at St Stephen's Cathedral.

By the end of the war, the Army and Army Air Forces (AAF) had 54,000 nurses, and the Navy had 11,000—all women.

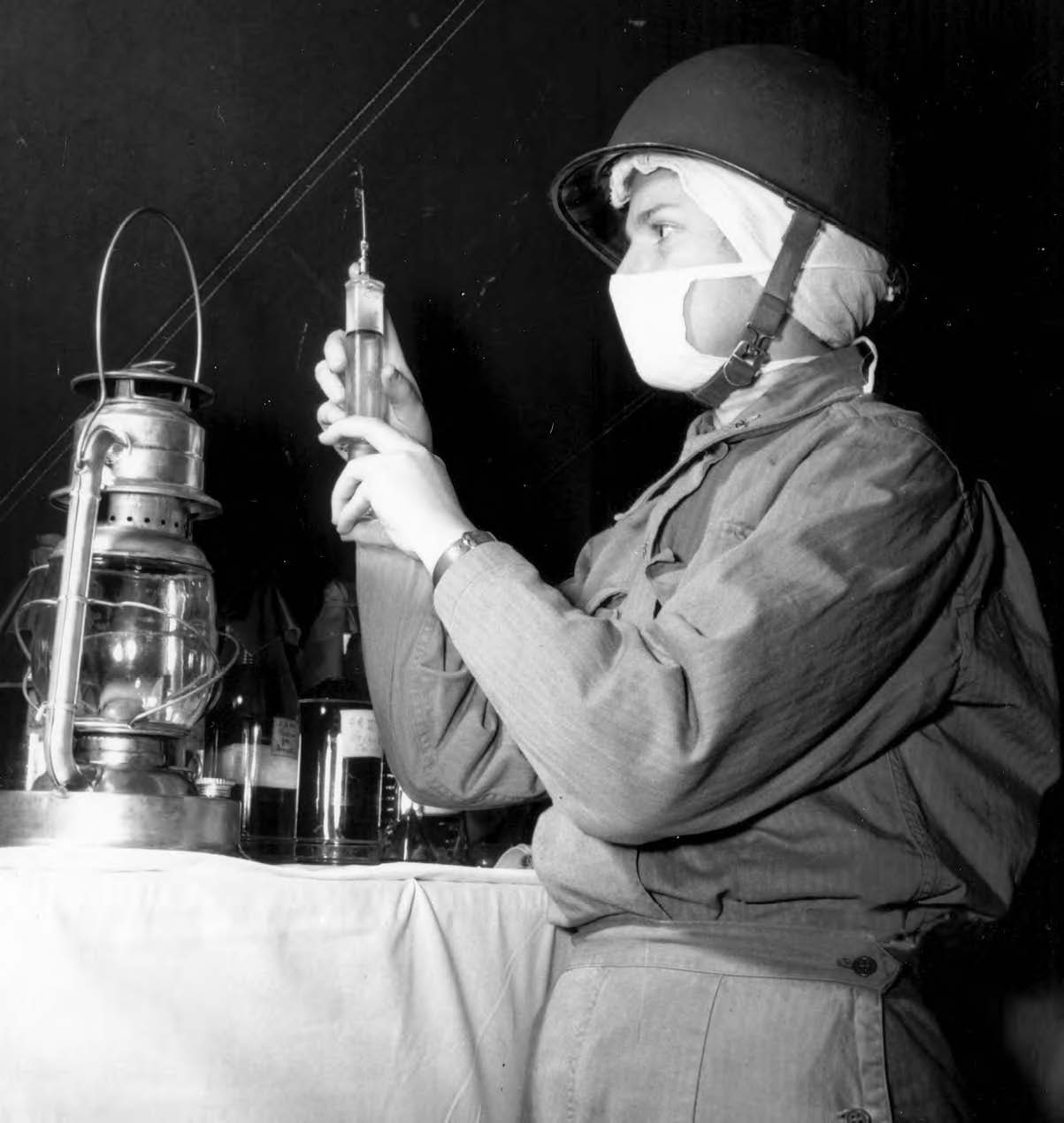
U.S. Army nurse wearing a helmet and fatigue uniform.

Some 217 black nurses served in all-black Army medical units. The AAF was virtually autonomous by 1942 and likewise was its Nurse Corps. Much larger numbers of enlisted men served as medics. These men were in effect practical nurses who handled routine care under the direction of nurse officers. Likewise many enlisted Wacs and Wafs served in military hospitals. Medical advances greatly increased survival rates for the wounded: 96% of the 670,000 wounded soldiers and sailors who made it to a field hospital staffed by nurses and doctors survived their injuries. Amputations were seldom necessary to combat gangrene. Penicillin and sulfa drugs proved highly successful in this regard. Nurses were deeply involved with post-operative recovery procedures, air evacuation, and new techniques in psychiatry and anesthesia.

Upon Flikke's retirement in 1943, she was succeeded by Florence A. Blanchfield, who successfully promoted new laws in 1947, that established the Army, Navy, and Air Force Nurse Corps on a permanent basis, giving the nurses regular commissions on exactly the same terms as male officers. A month before she retired in 1947, Blanchfield became the first woman to hold a regular Army commission.

==== Prisoners of war ====
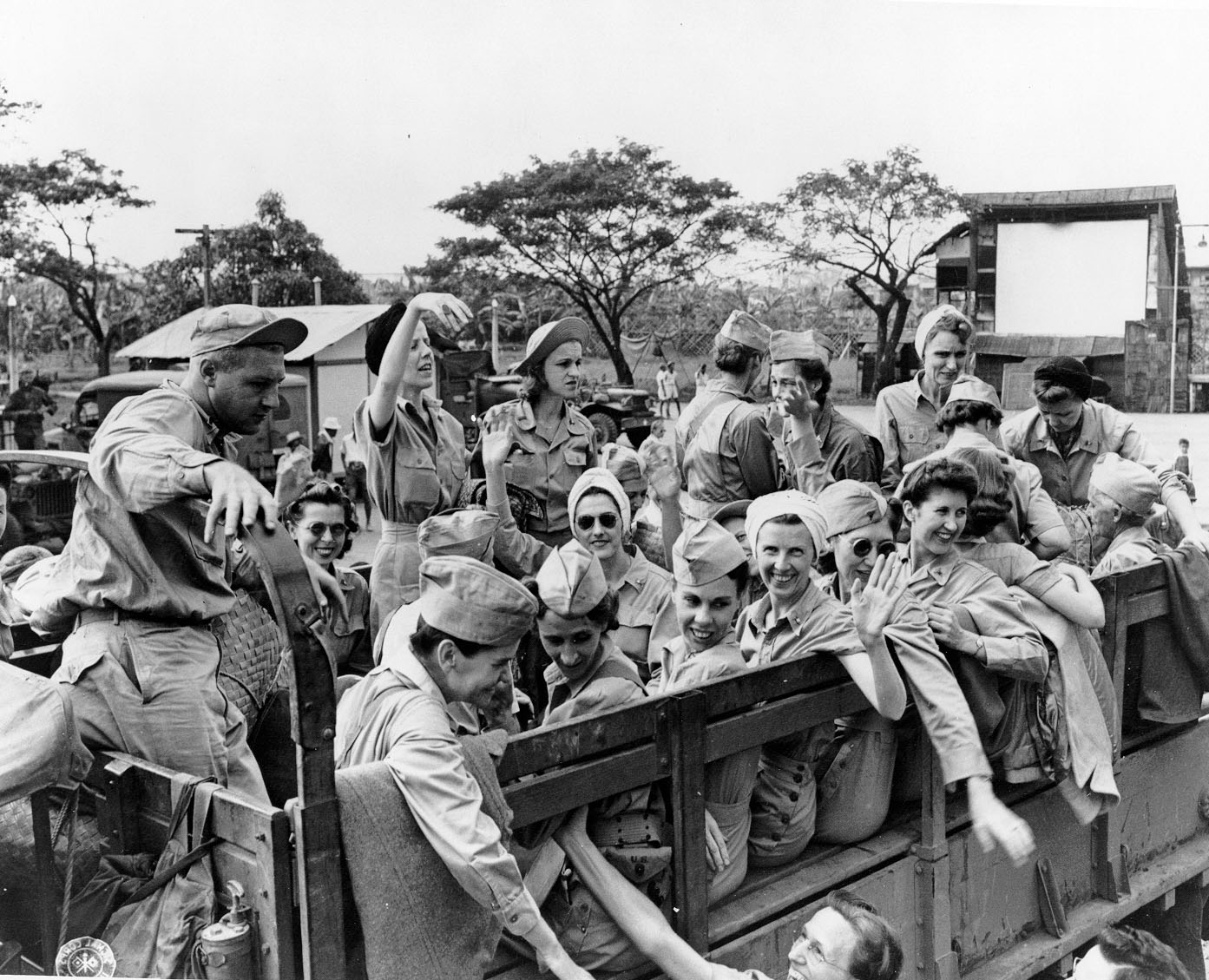
Army nurses in the Philippines liberated after three years as POWs

=== Korea ===
During the Korean War, Army nurses would once again treat the wounded. Nurses would staff MASH units and standard emplaced hospitals in Japan and Korea. Nurses were on the forefront of battlefield medicine during the conflict, playing a major role in the treatment of the wounded U.N. forces within mere minutes or hours of the wounds being inflicted.

In September 1955, President Eisenhower suffered a heart attack while on vacation near Denver. He was hospitalized at Fitzsimons Army Medical Center. During his six weeks of recovery, Ike talked to his Army nurses. He discovered their quarters were substandard, that nurses rotated overseas more often than other soldiers and they were forced to leave the military at age fifty-five. Nurses were also promoted more slowly than other soldiers. Ike directed the corps be led by a brigadier general and that the other issues be corrected.

=== Vietnam ===
The Army Nurse Corps stopped being all-female in 1955; that year Edward L.T. Lyon was the first man to receive a commission in the Army Nurse Corps. During the Vietnam War many Army nurses would see deployment to South East Asia. Army nurses would staff all major Army hospitals in the theater, including Cam Ranh Bay, Da Nang, and Saigon. Vietnam would be the first major deployment of men as nurses into the combat theater, as men could be located in more hazardous locations than what was considered safe for women. Many Army nurses faced enemy fire for the first time due to the unconventional nature of the conflict and eight female and one male nurse would die in the conflict. 1LT Sharon Lane was the only nurse to die by enemy fire during the Vietnam War when on 8 June 1969, she was mortally wounded when a rocket hit her facility, the 312th Evacuation Hospital. On at least one occasion, the US Army hospital at Cam Ranh Bay was assaulted and severely damaged, with a loss of both patient and staff life.

=== Modern Nurse Corps ===
Army Nurses are deployed all over the world, participating in humanitarian missions, and supporting the Global War on Terror. The Nurse Corps continues to operate as a part of the Army Medical Department. Most training is conducted at Fort Sam Houston, Texas.

== Insignia and badges ==
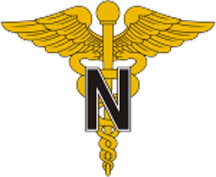
Nurse Corps branch of service insignia

The Nurse Corps has a distinctive insignia, a gold color metal caduceus, bearing an 'N' in black enamel.

== Superintendents and chiefs ==
From its founding in 1901 until after World War II in 1947, the Army Nurse Corps was led by a superintendent. Its nurses had no permanent commissioned rank. The Army-Navy Nurses Act took effect on 16 April 1947, establishing the Army Nurse Corps as a staff corps, with officers holding permanent commissioned ranks from second lieutenant to lieutenant colonel. The corps was to be led by a director holding the rank of colonel while in that position.

Superintendents of the Army Nurse Corps
No.	Rank	Name	Photo	Term Began	Term Ended
1		Dita H. Kinney		March 1901	July 1909
2		Jane A. Delano		August 1909	March 1912
3		Isabel McIsaac		April 1912	September 1914
4	CAPT.	Dora E. Thompson		September 1914	December 1919
5	MAJ.	Julia C. Stimson		December 1919	May 1937
6	COL.	Julia O. Flikke		June 1937	June 1943
7	COL.	Florence A. Blanchfield		July 1943	September 1947

Chiefs of the Army Nurse Corps
No.	Rank	Name	Photo	Term Began	Term Ended
1	COL.	Mary G. Phillips		October 1947	September 1951
2	COL.	Ruby F. Bryant		October 1951	September 1955
3	COL.	D'Lorz Inez Haynes		October 1955	August 1959
4	COL.	Margaret Harper		October 1959	August 1963
5	COL.	Mildred Irene Clark		September 1963	August 1967
6	BG	Anna Mae V. Hays		September 1967	August 1971
7	BG	Lillian Dunlap		September 1971	August 1975
8	BG	Madelyn N. Parks		September 1975	August 1979
9	BG	Hazel W. Johnson		September 1979	August 1982
10	BG	Connie L. Slewitzke		September 1983	August 1987
11	BG	Clara L. Adams-Ender		September 1987	August 1991
12	BG	Nancy R. Adams		November 1991	December 1995
13	BG	Bettye H. Simmons		December 1995	January 2000
14	BG	William T. Bester		May 2000	June 2004
15	MG	Gale S. Pollock		July 2004	July 2008
16	MG	Patricia D. Horoho		July 2008	December 2011
17	MG	Jimmie O. Keenan		January 2012	November 2015
18	MG	Barbara R. Holcomb		November 2015	July 2019
19	BG	Jack M. Davis		July 2019	November 2023
20	BG	James D. Burk		November 2023	Present

== Notable Army Nurse Corps officers ==
- Col. Ruby Bradley – one of the most decorated female officers for service in World War II and Korea.
- 1st Lt. Reba Cameron — career Army nurse, recipient of the Distinguished Service Medal for her work in World War I.
- Dorothea Dix – First Superintendent of Army Nurses.
- CPT Diane Carlson Evans – Vietnam era nurse, founder of the Vietnam Woman's Memorial Foundation.
- 1st Lt. Annie Fox – first woman to receive the Purple Heart for actions during Pearl Harbor. This award was later converted to a Bronze Star when the criteria for the Purple Heart changed.
- LT Ruth M. Gardiner - first nurse to die in action during World War II, killed in Alaska July 1943.
- Cornelia Hancock – civilian nurse serving the Union Army during the American Civil War, injured in battle.
- E. Ann Hoefly - served as a nurse in World War II and was later chief of the US Air Force Nurse Corps.
- Lt Col Rae Landy - pioneering Hadassah nurse in Palestine, career Army Nurse.
- CPT Diane Lindsay - first black women to be awarded the Soldier's Medal.
- Clara Maass – contract nurse for the Army during the Spanish–American War, died participating in an army yellow fever study.
- Anita Newcomb McGee – a physician, she became the acting assistant Army surgeon in charge of nursing during the Spanish–American War. Helped to write some of the legislation that eventually created the Army Nurse Corps.
- Anna Maxwell – instrumental in the establishment of the Army Nurse Corps.
- CPT María Inés Ortiz – first nurse to die in combat since Vietnam, killed in Iraq July 2007.
- Susie Taylor – first African American Army nurse.
- Adah Belle Thoms – instrumental in gaining the right of African American nurses to serve in Army Nurse Corps.
- Dr. Mary Edwards Walker – served as a civilian nurse during the American Civil War, became the Army's first female surgeon and Medal of Honor recipient.
- Maj. Almyra Maynard Watson – served as a nurse in World War II and the Korean War.

== See also ==
- United States Navy Nurse Corps
- United States Air Force Nurse Corps
- Mobile Army Surgical Hospital (MASH)
- Combat support hospital (CSH)
- Field hospital
- Army nursing (disambiguation)
- Vietnam Women's Memorial
- Military Women's Memorial
- National Association of Army Nurses of the Civil War
