= Barbara Brannon =

United States Air Force general

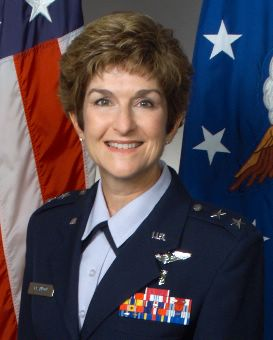
- Maj. Gen. Barbara C. Brannon, USAF
- Occupation: US Air Force officer
- Years active: 1975–2005

Barbara Brannon is a retired major general in the United States Air Force who served as head of the Air Force Nurse Corps.

Brannon has a BS in nursing from San Francisco State University and an MS in nursing from the University of California, San Francisco. Brannon joined the Air Force as a nurse in 1975.

== Sources ==
- Air Force biography of Brannon
