= Psychiatric and mental health nursing in the United States Army =

Psychiatric and mental health nurses in the U.S. Army Nurse Corps employing groundbreaking protocols and treatments in psychiatric issues to address the unique challenges that our service men and women face, more commonly post-traumatic stress disorder and traumatic brain injuries. Most people understand that trauma exposure is a popular occupational hazard for military members. Psychiatric screenings, before and during their enlistment, and treatments after being exposed to warfare, death, destruction, and torture have been extremely beneficial for military personnel and their dependents.

Psychiatric and mental health nurses treat individuals diagnosed with conditions like schizophrenia, post-traumatic stress disorder, bipolar disorder, and depression. They are also trained in behavioral therapy which allows these nurses to teach patients and their loved ones how to deal with, react to, and overcome challenges that go along with different psychiatric disorders. Nurses in the psychiatric and mental health field can assess, examine, and treat patients with mental illness. Nurses with proper training are able to identify and understand the needs and help-seeking behaviors of military members and, with military cultural competence and knowledge about stress injuries, including psychological damage, they are able to deliver patient-centered care to patients with military culture experiences.

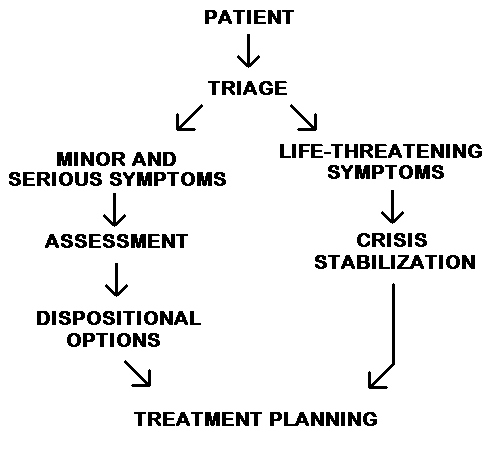
Emergency Psychiatry Process

== Duties and responsibilities ==
- Prevention of mental illness through mental health promotion activities, interventions when emotional and mental health problems arise, and stabilization of individuals at their highest level of functioning
- Provide specialized care to emotionally distressed individuals both as inpatients and outpatients and provide consultations within the general community
- Conduct patient counseling, crisis intervention, medication management, milieu and group therapy, and critical incident stress debriefings (CISD)
- Serve as an expert educator, adviser, and consultant on mental health issues to department chiefs and staff as well as the patients and their families
- Coordinate outpatient psychiatric care within the behavioral health care service line
- Conduct medical research on diseases of military importance
- Conduct, supervise and participate in graduate medical education and training of other medical personnel
- Facilitating social and emotional needs
- Supervising medication schedules
- Evaluating patient progress
- Maintaining a safe environment

=== Unique duty positions ===
- Psychiatric Clinical Staff or Head Nurse
- Head nurse in an alcohol and drug treatment program
- Advanced practice positions such as a Psychiatric and Mental Health Nurse Practitioner
- Clinical section chief
- Instructor
- Program director
- Member of medical company combat stress control or medical detachment

=== Requirements ===
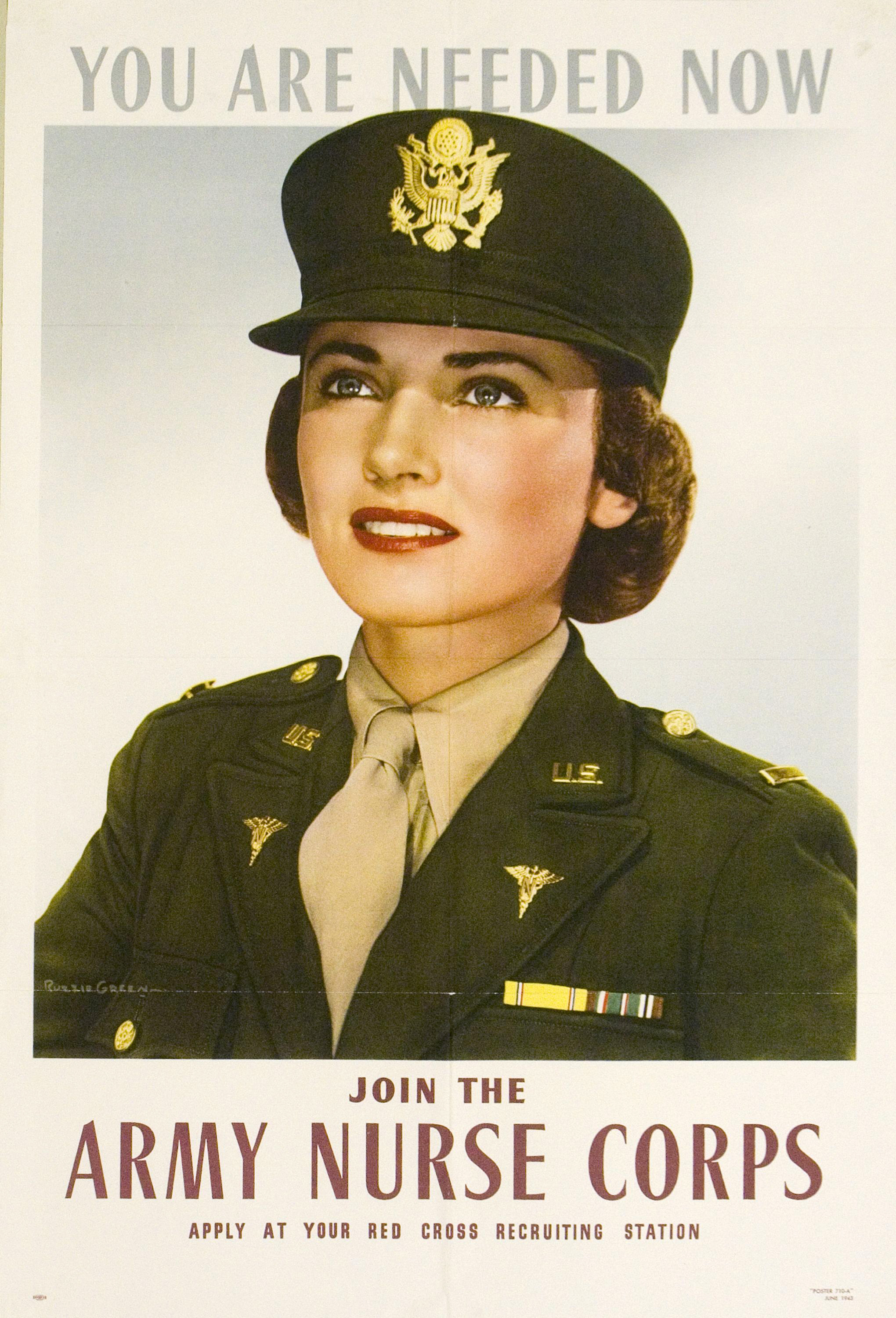
"Join the Army Nurse Corps" picture, circa June 1943

==== Active duty ====
- Bachelor's of Science in Nursing degree from an accredited nursing program
- Between 21 and 42 years of age
- Current, valid and unrestricted nursing license
- U.S. citizenship

==== Army reserve ====
- Minimum of a Bachelor's or associate degree in Nursing or diploma in nursing from an accredited nursing school
- At least one year of experience in psychiatric nursing
- Between 21 and 42 years of age
- Current, valid and unrestricted nursing license
- U.S. citizenship or permanent residency

=== Training ===
==== Active duty ====
In the U.S. Army, the case diversity nurses experience in caring for Soldiers and their families far exceeds the medical care environment of the private sector. Army Nurse Corps officers have access to the most sophisticated and up-to-date technology, the opportunity to consult with experts in both the military and private sector, plus exceptional professional growth opportunities, which may include but are not limited to paid continuing education, clinical specialization, and residencies.

==== Army reserve ====
The Army Reserve Nurse Corps begins with the Army Medical Department Basic Officer Leaders Course (BOLC), a three-week program that will expose nurses to the variety of mental and physical challenges they will face as a member of the United States Army's health care team. Candidates learn about the Army's approach to health care firsthand, train with other professionals, and attending lectures, conferences, and demonstrations that cover everything from U.S. Army customs to crisis management. Some candidates even have the opportunity to participate in a hands-on medical simulation of an in-theater field medical unit.

After completing BOLC, nurses will then begin serving with a Reserve unit a minimum of two days each month, and participate in annual training for at least two weeks each year. During this time, duties may include attending professional seminars and military or nursing education courses provided by the U.S. Army as well as the opportunity to work in a wide range of health care environments, whether it be in a modern hospital, working with skilled professionals in a variety of clinical situations or supervising paraprofessionals in a field medical unit.

== Walter Reed National Military Medical Center ==
Walter Reed National Military Medical Center logo

The Walter Reed National Military Medical Center, formerly known as the Walter Reed Army Medical Center and was open from May 1909 to August 2011 then realigned with the National Naval Medical Center, is located in Washington, D.C. and serves more than 150,000 active and retired military personnel from all branches, admitting 16,000 patients a year. As a provider of specialized care and a referral center for the North Atlantic Regional Medical Command, WRNMMC offers a broad range of clinical and educational opportunities as well as focusing on integrated patient care, teaching, and research opportunities.

=== Research ===
Early research began in the 1950s with the electrophysiology of neurons in the visual system provided the groundwork for Dr. David Hubel's 1981 Nobel Prize in Medicine. This standard of excellence has been kept with years of research innovations leading to over multiple patents for scientific contributions and numerous publications in high-impact journals such as Science, Nature, the New England Journal of Medicine, and the Journal of the American Medical Association.

==== The United States Army Medical Research Unit - Europe ====
The United States Army Medical Research Unit - Europe (USAMRU-E), a subordinate command of the Walter Reed National Military Center, is currently located in Heidelberg, Germany. USAMRU-E conducts applied psychological research to protect, optimize, and enhance psychological resilience for military members while also studying factors that can impact current stressors on the unit as well as the individual and their family. USAMRU-E focuses on command-directed behavioral health assessments and the development and validation of resilience training for the deployment cycle and the professional military education system. At USAMRU-E, individuals are exposed to a wide range of stressors that can negatively impact their behavioral health and well-being. Approximately 20% of those exposed report significant behavioral health problems upon returning from a combat deployment.

=== The National Capital Consortium Psychiatry Residency Program ===
The National Capital Consortium (NCC) Psychiatry Residency Program, which began in 1996, is unique and innovative graduate medical education program in psychiatry for military medical professionals. For over sixty years, neuropsychiatry investigators at the Walter Reed Army Institute of Research have worked to understand, prevent, and treat the poorly understood and untreated threats to military members health and performance that is just "in their head." Three military medical institutions, WRNMMC, Fort Belvoir Community Hospital (FBCH), and the Uniformed Services University of the Health Sciences (USUHS), are involved with this integrated psychiatry residency program while keeping the tradition of excellence in graduate medical education alive. NCC psychiatry residents consistently score among the highest in the nation on standard training examinations and a large number of graduates have gone on to become national and world leaders in psychiatry.

==== Program overview ====
The National Capital Military Psychiatry Residency is a four-year program designed to prepare military physicians and nurses for the practice of general psychiatry in the military and in community settings upon discharge from the military. The program's mission is to train military physicians and nurses to become effective psychiatrists and psychiatric nurses in the variety of future roles they will fill, from military medical operations to multi-disciplinary mental health settings to primary care and other medical-surgical settings. Those who enroll in the psychiatric residency program apply their techniques of social science and psychiatric research to understand and address the many global and day-to-day pressures of military life affecting "mental health" and "psychological resilience." Military psychiatry, psychotherapy, and psychopharmacology are particularly strong areas of emphasis of the program. Faculty members include nationally known leaders in a number of areas of psychiatry, including psychopharmacology, psychoanalysis, neuropsychiatry, child and adolescent psychiatry, consultation-liaison psychiatry, and military psychiatry.

Combined residency training opportunities are also offered by the program. Army residents may apply for a 3+2 child psychiatry fellowship, and if accepted, may complete both general and child and adolescent psychiatry training in a total of five years. There is also a five-year combined internal medicine and psychiatry training program offered by the NCC Psychiatry and Internal Medicine Residency Programs. Graduates of this combined program complete requirements necessary for graduation from both residencies and for board certification in both general psychiatry and internal medicine. They also use traditional methods of individual and small-group interview, standard and specialized psychological tests and surveys, and objective measures such as the rates of suicide, re-enlistment, and post-traumatic stress disorder (PTSD), to make wide-ranging assessments of slider and military family health and to recommend changes to organization, training, and leadership.
