= Dora E. Thompson =

American nurse (1876–1954)

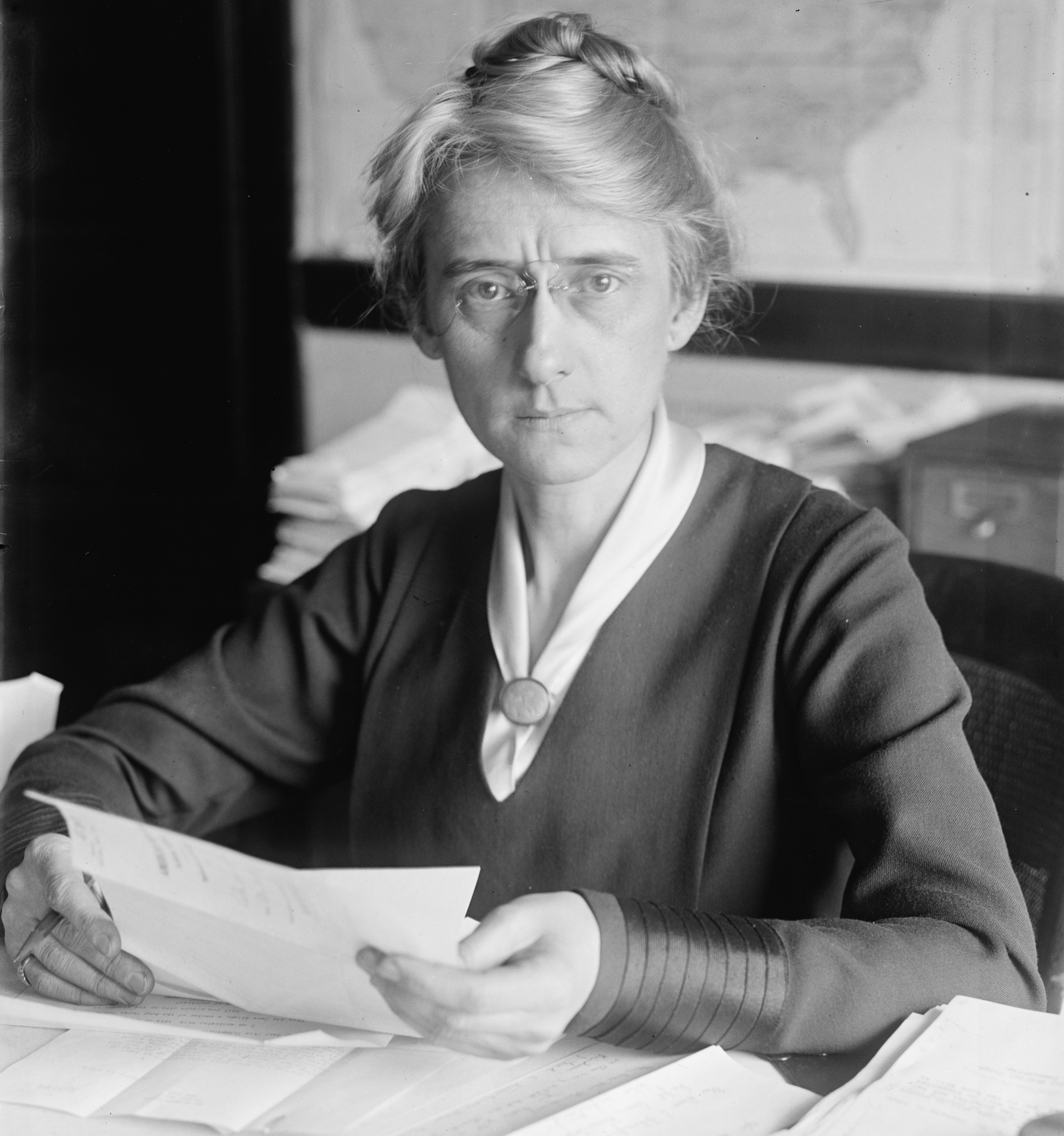
- Born: Dora Elizabeth Thompson; 1876; Cold Spring, New York, U.S.
- Died: June 23, 1954 (aged 77–78); San Francisco, California, U.S.
- Resting place: Arlington National Cemetery
- Occupation: Nurse
- Awards: Distinguished Service Medal

Dora Elizabeth Thompson (1876 – June 23, 1954) was the fourth Army Nurse Corps Superintendent, and the first selected from within the Corps, having served as an Army nurse for 12 years prior to her appointment. She received the Distinguished Service Medal for her service during World War I.

== Early life ==
Dora Elizabeth Thompson was born in 1876, at Cold Spring, New York, to Dora and Arthur Thompson. Her father was a carpenter from Canada. At five years old, her father died and she was raised by her aunt Alma Armstrong. In 1897, she graduated from New York Hospital Training School for Nurses. She took a postgraduate course on operating room methods.

== Career ==
Thompson started working as an operating room and private duty nurse for a few years. She joined the United States Army Nurse Corps in 1902. She was assigned to the Army General Hospital at Presidio of San Francisco. In August 1905, she was promoted to chief nurse and oversaw the hospital through the 1906 San Francisco earthquake. In 1911, she was transferred to the division hospital in Manila as chief nurse. She served for 12 years before getting promoted as superintendent on September 22, 1914. She was the fourth superintendent of the Nurse Corps and the first superintendent of the Nurse Corps selected from within. She was the first superintendent to tackle global war problems, including the procurement and assignment of nurses. During World War I, the Nurse Corps expanded from less than 400 to 21,480 nurses serving in the United States, Europe, and the Philippines.

In November 1919, Thompson received the Distinguished Service Medal for "her accuracy, good judgement...untiring devotion to duty" and for her "splendid management of the Army Nurse Corps during the emergency". After the war, she took sick leave and a leave of absence. She spent a month at Greystone, a nurses's rest home in Riverdale, Bronx. She returned to service in December 1919 and resigned as superintendent on December 29, 1919. The following day, she requested an appointment as chief nurse of the department hospital in Manila. Instead, she was appointed as assistant superintendent, which gave her the added responsibility for all Army nurses in the Philippines, Siberia and Tianjin, China. In 1920, when the Army gave its nurses relative rank, she became a captain. After three years in the Philippines, she returned to the United States. She became chief nurse of the Letterman General Hospital in 1922. She retired on August 31, 1932.

== Later years ==
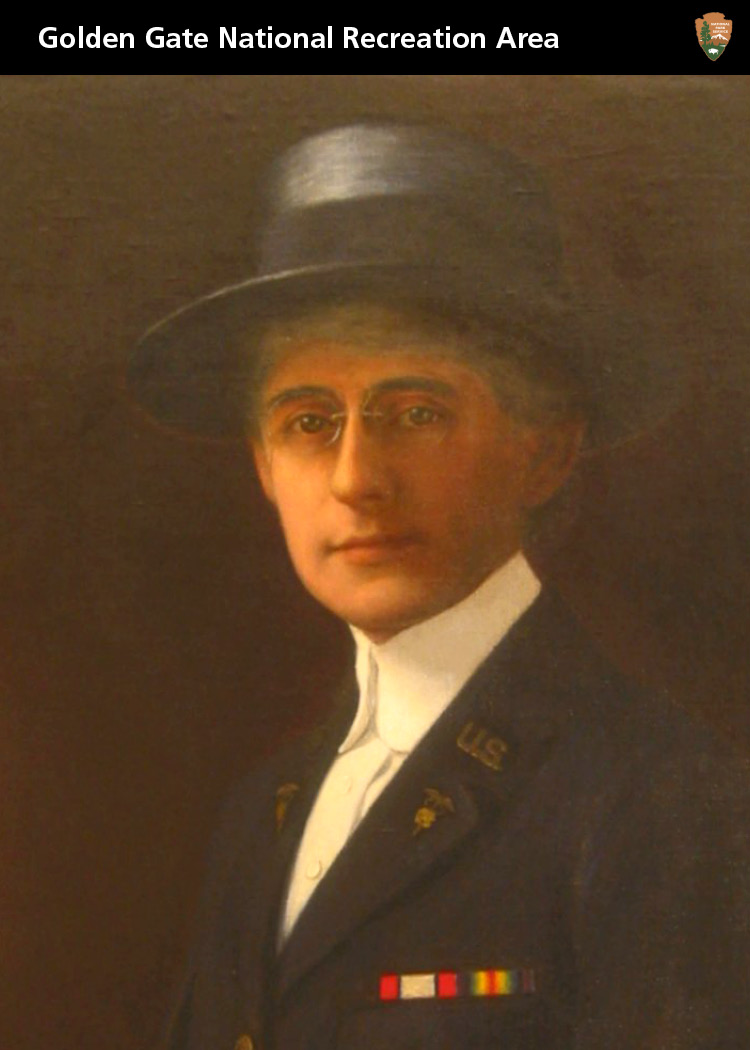
National Park Service trading card drawing of Thompson

Thompson spent her later years in San Francisco with a houseman in a home overlooking the Golden Gate Bridge. She had purchased the home from an earlier investment in a Philippine gold mine.

Thompson died on June 23, 1954, in San Francisco. She was buried at Arlington National Cemetery.

== Legacy ==
In May 1955, the women officers' quarters at Letterman Hospital was renamed to Thompson Hall in her honor.
