= Annie Fox (nurse) =

United States Army officer

Major Annie G. Fox
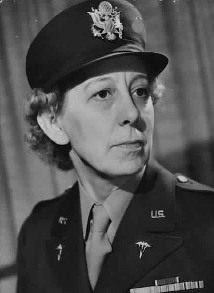
- Born: August 4, 1893; East Pubnico, Nova Scotia, Canada
- Died: January 20, 1987 (aged 93); San Mateo County, California, United States
- Citizenship: American (born in Canada)
- Occupations: Officer, US Army Nurse Corps

Maj. Annie G. Fox (August 4, 1893 – January 20, 1987) was a Canadian-born American, the first woman to receive the Purple Heart for combat. She served as the chief nurse in the Army Nurse Corps at Hickam Field during the Japanese attack on Pearl Harbor, on December 7, 1941. At that time the awarding of the Purple Heart did not require the service member to be injured. The requirements were changed after the attack of Pearl Harbor and Fox (at the time, a Lieutenant) was then awarded the Bronze Star because she was not wounded in the attack.

== Pearl Harbor and Purple Heart ==
First Lieutenant Annie G. Fox was on duty at the time of the attack of the Japanese Imperial Navy on Hawaii. For her outstanding performance, Fox was recommended for and awarded the Purple Heart. She was not injured during the attack. Fox was presented the Purple Heart on October 26, 1942, at Hickam Field. Colonel William Boyd, Post Commander read the citation which was commanded by Brigadier General W.E. Farthing and signed by Colonel L.P. Turner, Air Corps Executive Officer.

The Purple Heart was awarded for

“outstanding performance of duty and meritorious acts of extraordinary fidelity. . .

During the attack, Lieutenant Fox, in an exemplary manner, performed her duties as head Nurse of the Station Hospital. . .

in addition she administered anesthesia to patients during the heaviest part of the bombardment, assisted in dressing the wounded, taught civilian volunteer nurses to make dressings, and worked ceaselessly with coolness and efficiency, and her fine example of calmness, courage and leadership was of great benefit to the morale of all with whom she came in contact...”

=== Bronze Star ===
The Purple Heart was originally established by General George Washington in 1782. It was re-instituted in 1932 for the bicentennial of Washington's birth. Although generally awarded to service members wounded in action, it was also awarded for any "singularly meritorious act of extraordinary fidelity or essential service." Later in the war, the requirements for award of the Purple Heart were limited to wounds received as a result of enemy action. At that time, individuals were given other awards to replace the Purple Heart.

On October 6, 1944, 1st Lieutenant Fox was awarded the Bronze Star Medal. The Report of Decorations Board cited the same acts of heroism as those cited for the Purple Heart. The last paragraph of the report reads:

“The Bronze Star Medal is in lieu of the Purple Heart awarded. . . Since Lieutenant Fox was not wounded in action. Cancellation of the award of the Purple Heart is also recommended.”

The recommendation of the board was approved.

In March 2017, Hawaii Magazine ranked her among a list of the most influential women in Hawaiian history.
