= Julia O. Flikke =

Director of the US Army Nurse Corps

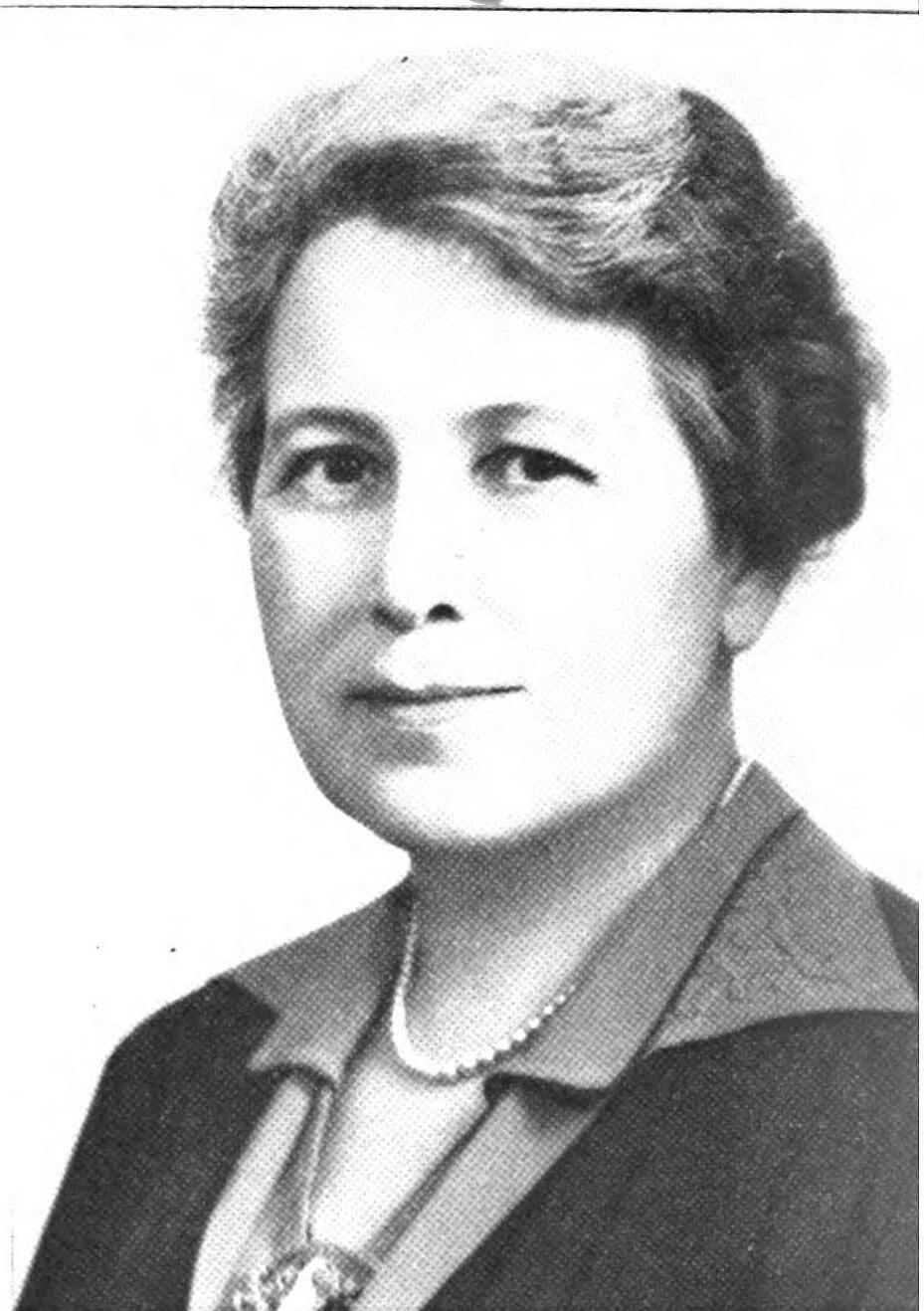
- Born: March 16, 1878
- Died: February 23, 1965 (aged 86)
- Occupation: Nurse

Julia Otteson Flikke (March 16, 1879 – February 23, 1965) was an American nurse. Her service to the United States Army Nurse Corps spanned both world wars and included overseas assignments in the Philippines and China. In 1927, she was appointed Assistant Superintendent of the ANC and was promoted to the relative rank of captain. In 1937, she succeeded Julia Stimson as Superintendent with the relative rank of major. She was the last superintendent to hold the office before the statutory limitation of four years was placed on the tenure. She was also the first woman to hold the rank of full colonel in the Army (also known as a 'girlnel') . Although the rating was temporary then (1942), it marked a step forward to granting of full military rank and privileges in 1947. She retired due to disability in June 1943.

Julia O. Flikke was born in Viroqua, Wisconsin, on March 16, 1879. She would receive her early education there. Flikke married in 1901, but her husband died ten years later. The following year, she entered the School of Nursing of the Augustana Hospital in Chicago. She graduated in 1915, and, after several months of postgraduate education, Flikke accepted a post as assistant principal of her old school. She would stay there until entering the United States Army Nurse Corps on March 11, 1918, and (after being promoted to chief nurse) serving in Lakewood Township, New Jersey as well as Staten Island. Flick moved to Base Camp No. 11, in France in 1918, serving in several hospitals before returning to the United States in 1919. She first worked at Camp Upton, and subsequently travelled around the country, before setting in Walter Reed General Hospital, where she would work for twelve years.
