= Della H. Raney =

African-American army nurse (1912–1987)

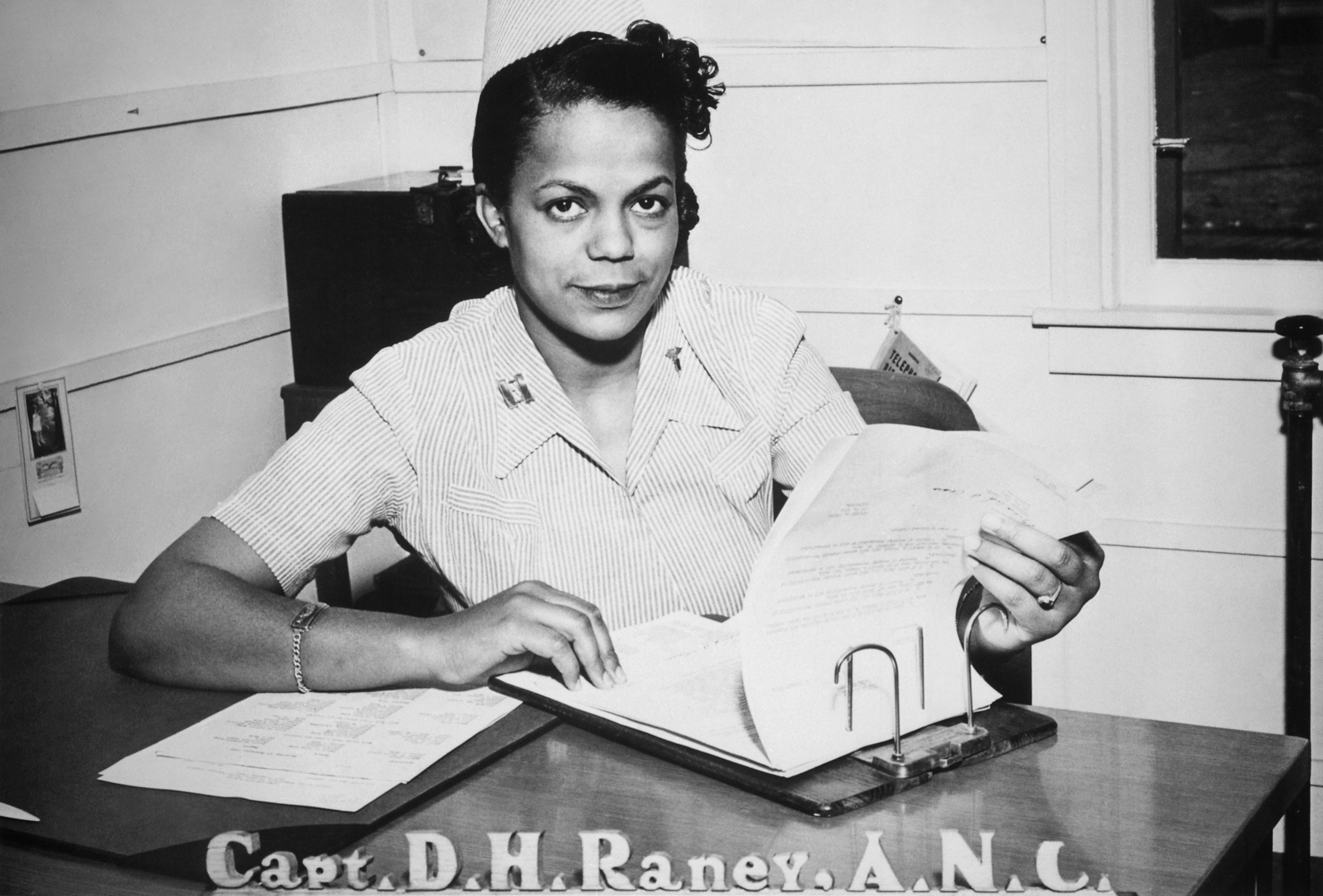
- Raney in 1945
- Born: January 10, 1912; Suffolk, Virginia, U.S.
- Died: October 23, 1987 (aged 75)
- Military career
- Allegiance: United States
- Branch: United States Army
- Service years: 1941–1978
- Rank: Major
- Unit: Army Nurse Corps
- Conflicts: World War II
- Awards: Good Conduct Medal; Women’s Army Corps Service Medal; WWII Victory Medal; Asiatic-Pacific Campaign Medal; American Campaign Medal

Della Hayden Raney (January 10, 1912 – October 23, 1987) was an American nurse in the Army Nurse Corps. Raney was the first African American nurse to report for duty in World War II and the first to be appointed chief nurse. In 1944, she became the first black nurse affiliated with the Army Air Corps promoted to captain, and she was later promoted to major in 1946. Raney retired from the Army in 1978.

== Biography ==
Della H. Raney was born on January 10, 1912, in Suffolk, Virginia. She graduated from the Lincoln Hospital School of Nursing in 1937. At Lincoln, she worked as an operation supervisor and before enlisting in the military had also worked at the Community Hospital of Norfolk, Virginia, and at the K.B. Reynolds Hospital in Winston-Salem.

In April 1941, Raney reported for duty and was the first African American nurse to serve in the Army Nurse Corps in World War II. Raney, commissioned as a second lieutenant, was first stationed at Fort Bragg, where she worked as a nursing supervisor. The next year, she was transferred to the Tuskegee Army Air Field Station Hospital. Raney worked as the chief nurse there and was promoted to captain in 1944. Also in 1944, she was transferred to Fort Huachuca. At the time, she was the only black woman to earn that rank and work for the Army Air Forces. In 1946, she was on terminal leave from Camp Beale where she worked as head nurse. Raney was also promoted to the rank of major that year. She was the first black nurse promoted to the rank of major in the US Army. In the 1950s, she was stationed at the Percy Jones Army Medical Hospital. Raney served in the Army until her retirement in 1978.

She was honored for her service by the Tuskegee Airmen in 1978. Fellow soldiers called her "Maw Raney."

On October 23, 1987, Raney died. The Tuskegee Airmen and the National Black Nurses Association created a scholarship named after her in 2012.
