= Lillian Dunlap =

American army officer and military nurse (1922–2003)

- Born: January 20, 1922; Mission, Texas, U.S.
- Died: April 3, 2003 (aged 81); Brooke Army Medical Center, San Antonio, Texas, U.S.
- Burial place: Fort Sam Houston National Cemetery
- Military career
- Allegiance: United States
- Branch: United States Army
- Service years: 1942–1975
- Rank: Brigadier General
- Commands: United States Army Nurse Corps
- Conflicts: World War II
- Awards: Army Distinguished Service Medal; Meritorious Service Medal; Army Commendation Medal (2)

Lillian Dunlap (January 20, 1922 – April 3, 2003) was an officer and military nurse in the United States Army. She served in the Pacific Theater during World War II, later rising to the rank of brigadier general and being made chief of the United States Army Nurse Corps.

Dunlap served as the 14th Chief of the Army Nurse Corps (ANC) from 1 September 1971 to 31 August 1975. She graduated from Santa Rosa Hospital School of Nursing in 1942, she received her Bachelor of Science cum laude from Incarnate Word College in San Antonio, Texas in 1954. She received her Master of Health Administration from Baylor University in Waco, Texas in 1960. Her main focus during her time as the ANC Corps Chief was professionalizing the education of military nurses by creating a standard Bachelor of Science in nursing.

On 23 October 1973 Dunlap became the first woman in the history of the United States Army to serve as president of a Department of the Army Officer promotion board.

She was decorated with the Army Distinguished Service Medal, the Meritorious Service Medal, and the Army Commendation Medal with oak leaf cluster.

== Military awards ==

1	Army Distinguished Service Medal	Meritorious Service Medal	Army Commendation Medal with one oak leaf cluster
2	American Campaign Medal	American Defense Service Medal with three bronze service stars	World War II Victory Medal
