= E. Ann Hoefly =

American nurse and brigadier general

- Born: Ethel Ann Hoefly; March 8, 1919; Queens, New York, U.S.
- Died: August 3, 2003 (aged 84); Summerfield, Florida, U.S.
- Burial place: Arlington National Cemetery
- Military career
- Allegiance: United States of America
- Branch: United States Army Nurse Corps; United States Air Force
- Service years: 1944–1946 (U.S. Army); 1949–1974 (U.S. Air Force)
- Rank: Brigadier general
- Commands: Chief of the Air Force Nurse Corps
- Awards: Legion of Merit; Air Force Outstanding Unit Award

Brigadier General Ethel Ann Hoefly (March 8, 1919 – August 3, 2003) was an American nurse and member of the United States Air Force. She served with the United States Army Nurse Corps during World War II and volunteered for service in the European Theater.

After the war, Hoefly left the army and worked in civilian hospitals. She rejoined the armed forces in 1949 when she enlisted in the recently formed US Air Force. She specialised in neuropsychiatry and became a flight nurse. She later served as chief of the Air Force Nurse Corps and was promoted to Brigadier-General on July 1, 1972.

== US Army Nurse Corps ==
Hoefly was born in Queens, New York in 1919 to longshoreman Otto Hoefly and Anna Iverson Hoefly, who emigrated from Germany and Norway, respectively. She graduated from high school in Hackettstown, New Jersey in 1938 and from the Methodist Hospital School of Nursing, Brooklyn in 1943.

In July 1944, she entered the US Army Nurse Corps, initially working at England General Hospital in Atlantic City, New Jersey, before volunteering for service overseas.

From December 1944 to January 1946, Hoefly was with the 235th General Hospital unit in the European Theater as a general nurse, before specialising in neuropsychiatry. Upon returning to the United States she left the Nurse Corps to become a general nurse at the Halloran General Hospital in Staten Island, New York. She studied anaesthesia before working as a neuropsychiatric nurse at Valley Forge General Hospital, Pennsylvania from September 1948 to March 1950.

== US Air Force service ==
Hoefly rejoined the armed forces in July 1949 when she enlisted in the recently formed US Air Force. She was awarded a post graduate diploma in neuropsychiatry at the Medical Field Service School at Fort Sam Houston, Texas in August 1950. She was then with the 306th Medical Group at MacDill Air Force Base Florida as a psychiatric nurse, completing the flight nurse course of the USAF School of Aviation Medicine there.

She was awarded a bachelor of science degree from the Florida Southern College in 1953 and from then until August 1954 was an instructor in psychiatry at the Medical Field Service School. She later served as a flight nurse with the 1734th Air Transportation Squadron at Brooks Air Force Base and received a masters in nursing administration from Columbia University.

In November 1956 Hoefly became an instructor flight nurse and was made chief of the Psychiatric Nurse Section at the 3883d School Group at Gunter Air Force Base, Alabama. She was then named deputy chief of the US Air Force Nurse Corps and chief nurse of the 5th Air Force, based at Tachikawa Air Base in Japan.

In 1967, she graduated from the Air War College and in July of that year was made chief nurse at Air Force Systems Command at Andrews Air Force Base, Maryland. She was appointed chief of the Air Force Nurse Corps in August 1968, managing some 180 medical facilities across the world. Hoefly graduated from the Industrial College of the Armed Forces in 1971. On July 1, 1972, she was promoted to brigadier-general.

Hoefly was awarded the Legion of Merit and the Air Force Outstanding Unit Award Ribbon with oak leaf cluster. Never married, in her spare time she enjoyed sculpting, fishing and carpentry. She died on August 3, 2003, and is buried at Arlington National Cemetery.

== Legacy ==
An award, named in her honor, has been granted annual by the Flight Nurse Section of the Aerospace Medicine Association since 1976 for achievements in flight nursing. The Flight Nurse Section was later renamed the Aerospace Nursing Society and the parent organization became the Aerospace Medical Association.
