= Operation Nightingale (United States) =

Vietnam War Army nurse recruitment effort

Operation Nightingale was an intensive effort by the United States Army Nurse Corps (ANC) to recruit nurses during the Vietnam War. The ANC had a shortage of nurses, and Operation Nightingale was aimed at recruiting 2,000 employees. It was not completely successful.

== Background ==
By early 1963 the United States Army Nurse Corps (ANC) was grappling with a shortage of nurses—it had only around 3,000 nurses. During the Cuban Missile Crisis in late 1962 army hospitals struggled to find enough nurses and in the decades prior the ANC had failed to grow in proportion with the size of the greater United States Army.

== Program ==
Begun on February 28, 1963, the nationwide program sought to add 2,000 nurses. At its peak, almost 150 people were working to sign up nurses. Recruiters "lecturing at high schools, universities, and career fairs, placing advertisements in stores, making radio announcements and TV commercials, and at times enlisting celebrity endorsements." They said that “women would experience an equality with men that they would not find in the civilian world.”

The operation included an 'Army Student Nurse Program', which offered to help a nurse pay for their education in return for service in the corps. The program accounted for most of the nurses who joined the ANC during the Vietnam War, and was utilized by around 600 nurses every year it was in operation. Other efforts to train nurses included through a four-year degree offered through the Walter Reed Army Institute of Nursing (associated with the University of Maryland). While the ANC did gain some nurses through these efforts, they were hindered by the time it took to train students, often several years. The ANC never overcame a shortage of nurses during the Vietnam War.
