= William T. Bester =

William T. Bester, RN, MSN
- Born: November 19, 1950 (age 75)
- Education: 1974 College of St. Scholastica - Bachelor's of Nursing; 1983 Catholic University - Master's of Medical/Surgical Nursing; 1997 Army War College
- Spouse: Cheryl Bester
- Military career
- Allegiance: United States
- Army Nurses Corps: Army
- Service years: 1974-2004
- Rank: Brigadier General
- Nickname: Bill
- Commands: 1997 Moncrief Army Community Hospital; 2000 Army Nurses Corps; 2002 United States Army Center for Health Promotion and Preventive Medicine

William T. Bester was a U.S. Army brigadier general and the first male chief nurse of the Army Nurses Corps.

== Early life ==
William Bester was born 19 November 1950 to William E. Bester, a railroad clerk, and Lorraine Bester (Gellatly). He attended College of St. Scholastica in Duluth, Minnesota where he earned a bachelor's of nursing in 1974 and joined the Army Student Nurse Program to help pay for his tuition and fees.

== Military career ==
First Lieutenant Bester was sent to the Army Medical Department (AMEDD) Officer Basic Course at Fort Sam Houston, Texas. He was then stationed at Madigan Army Medical Center at Fort Lewis, Washington. By 1976, Captain Bester was sent to Okinawa to serve as a clinical staff nurse. In 1977, he returned to Texas to attend the didactic component of the anesthesiology course at Beaumont Army Medical Center and then clinical anesthesia training at Madigan Army Medical Center.

In 1979, he was assigned to at Reynolds Army Hospital Fort Sill, Oklahoma where he would be assigned to temporary duty to the Cuban Refugee Operation at Fort Chaffee, Arkansas.

He volunteered in 1981 to change his specialty to field nursing and became chief nurse of the 10th Combat Support Hospital at Fort Meade, Maryland. In 1983, the Army sent him to Catholic University of America where he earned a master’s degree in medical-surgical nursing. Now Major Bester became a nurse instructor and AMEDD Regimental Adjutant at Fort Sam Houston in 1985. He was sent on recruiting duty from 1988-1900.

In 1990, Lieutenant Colonel Bester was assigned to Alexandria, VA, to serve as a Personnel Management Officer. In 1992, he returned to hospital work as chief of the department of nursing at Fort Benjamin Harrison, Indiana and then deputy commander for nursing at Fort Leavenworth, Kansas. In 1993, he was sent to USA MEDDAC in Wurzburg Germany as deputy commander for nursing at the 67th Combat Support Hospital. In 1994, Colonel Bester deployed to Taszar, Hungary in support of Operation Joint Endeavor with the 67th CSH.

Bester attended the Army War College in 1997 and then was the commander of the Moncrief Army Community Hospital at Fort Jackson, South Carolina. In 2000, he was promoted to brigadier general and became the 21st chief of the Army Nurse Corps. While chief of the ANC, Bester ensured that the army had a supply of nurses needed for Operation Enduring Freedom and Operation Iraqi Freedom. He also advocated for U.S. Army civilian contract nurses to better benefits. And he finalized plans for US. Army Reserve nurses to be required to have a bachelor's degree.

In 2002, he was made the assistant surgeon general for Force Projection and the commanding general, United States Army Center for Health Promotion and Preventive Medicine. He would retire from the army in 2004.

== Further career ==
After retirement, Bester was a professor of clinical nursing at the University of Texas-Austin. He then was chief nurse of a civilian humanitarian team in Indonesia aboard the US Navy Hospital Ship Mercy. From 2006-2014, he was a senior academic at the Uniformed Services University of the Health Sciences in Bethesda, Maryland.

== Military awards and decorations ==
Expert Field Medical Badge
Parachutist Badge

Distinguished Service Medal (Army)
Legion of Merit with two bronze oak leaf clusters
Meritorious Service Medal with four bronze oak leaf clusters
Army Commendation Medal with bronze oak leaf cluster
Army Achievement Medal
National Defense Service Medal with bronze oak leaf cluster
Armed Forces Service Medal
Military Outstanding Volunteer Service Medal
Armed Forces Reserve Medal
Army Service Ribbon
Army Overseas Service Ribbon
NATO Medal (Yugoslavia)
