= American Red Cross Nursing Service =

US Health organization

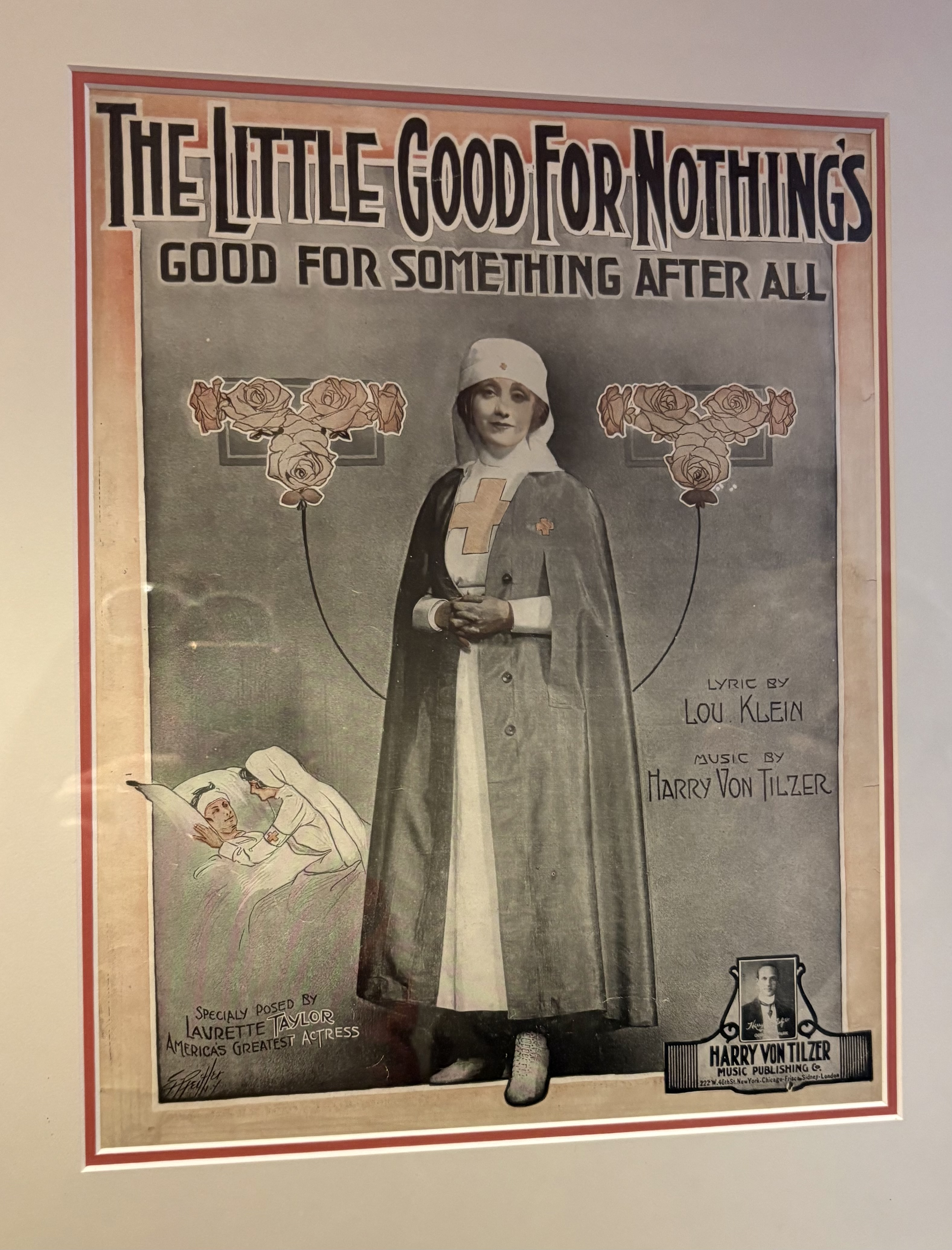
An American Red Cross Nursing Service recruitment poster from World War I, posed for by Laurette Taylor.

The American Red Cross Nursing Service was organized in 1909 by Jane Arminda Delano (1862-1919). A nurse and member of the American Red Cross, Delano organized the nursing service as the reserve of the Army Nurse Corps to be ready just before the entry of the United States into World War I. Key wartime decisions were made by Delano along with Mary Adelaide Nutting, president of the American Federation of Nurses, and Annie Warburton Goodrich, dean of the Army School of Nursing.

== See also ==
- History of nursing in the United States
