= LGBTQ culture in Baltimore =

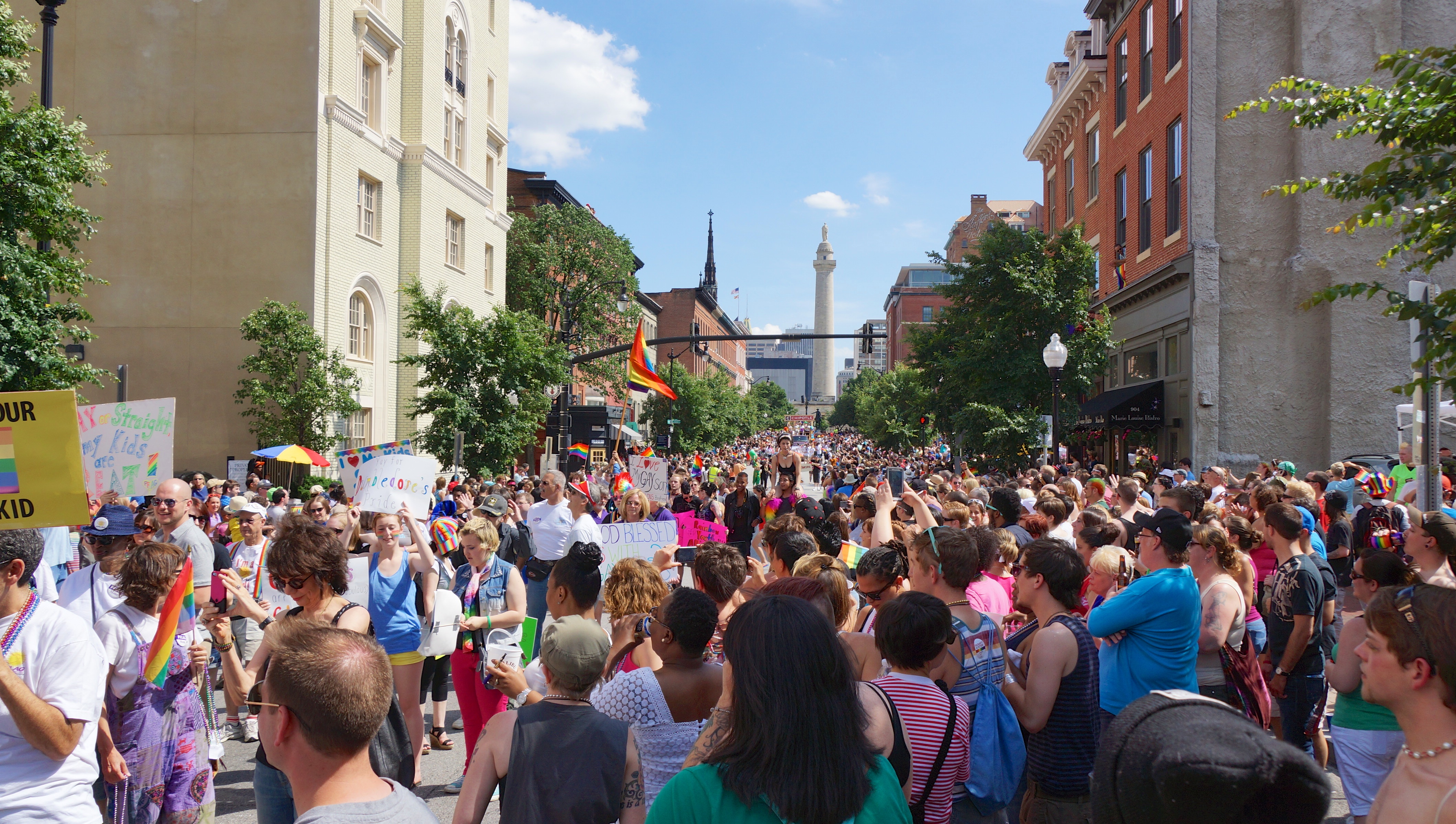
Participants at the Baltimore Pride parade, June 2013.

LGBT culture in Baltimore, Maryland is an important part of the culture of Baltimore, as well as being a focal point for the wider LGBT community in the Baltimore metropolitan area. Mount Vernon, known as Baltimore's gay village, is the central hub of the city's lesbian, gay, bisexual, and transgender communities.

== Events ==
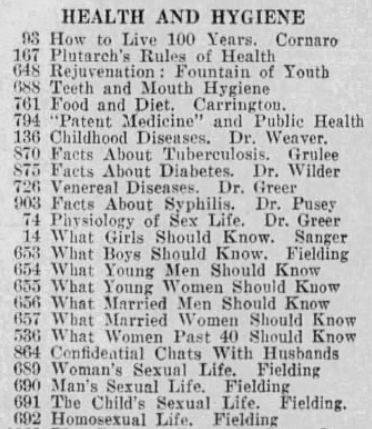
A 1926 Little Blue Books listing in the Baltimore Sun including William J. Fielding's "Homosexual Life".

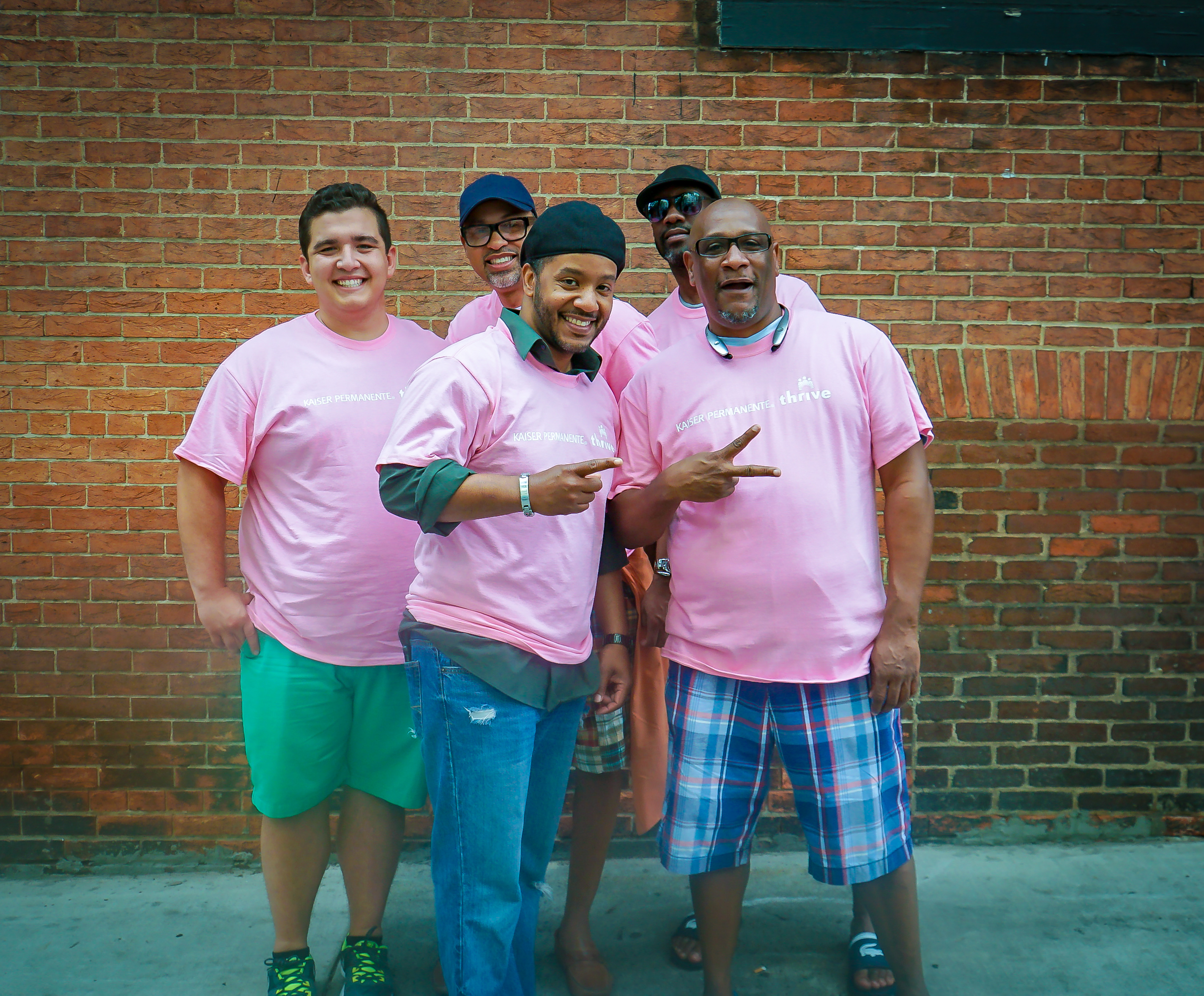
Gay men at Baltimore Pride, June 2017.

Baltimore Pride is one of the oldest gay pride celebrations in the United States. In 2019, Baltimore Pride celebrated its 44th annual event. Pride weekend in Baltimore is held from June 14 to June 16. The first day of Pride weekend involves the Baltimore Pride parade in Charles Village and the Baltimore Pride Block Party in Station North. The second day involves the Baltimore Pride Festival held at Druid Hill Park.

== History ==
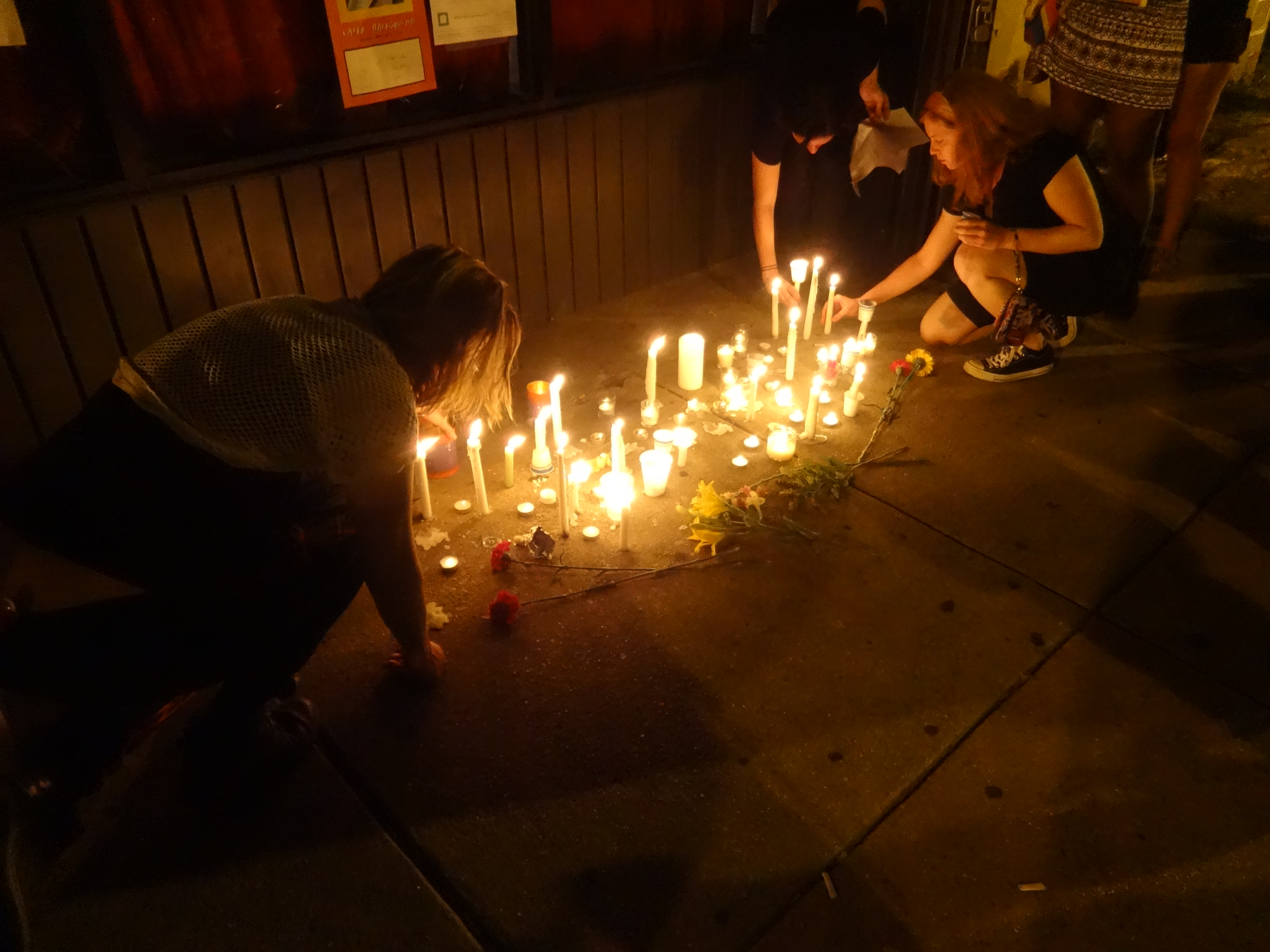
Baltimore candlelight vigil for the Pulse massacre in Orlando, 2016.

In 1931, the Baltimore Afro-American covered a local drag ball. The article detailed the "coming out of new debutantes into gay society." By 1931, the drag ball culture was starting to emerge into the mainstream in major cities such as Baltimore, Chicago, and New York. The Afro-American wrote that "The coming out of new debutantes into homosexual society was the outstanding feature of Baltimore's eighth annual frolic of the pansies when the art club was host to the neuter gender at the Elks' Hall."

In 1955, 162 gay men and lesbians were arrested on charges of disorderly conduct at the Pepper Hill Club on North Gay Street. It was the largest raid of a nightclub in Baltimore's history. The arrests were made after the nightclub's largely gay male patrons were seen kissing each other. Following the Pepper Hill raid, the head of Baltimore city's vice squad testified in court that he had warned the nightclub against allowing homosexuals to congregate. When charges were dismissed against co-owners Victor Lance and Morton Cohen, cheers of "hurray" erupted in the court from their supporters.

In 1978, African-American gay and bisexual men helped found the DC-Baltimore Coalition of Black Gays (now known as the D.C Coalition) to cater to LGBT African-Americans in the Baltimore–Washington metropolitan area.

Leon's, the first gay bar in Baltimore, opened in 1957. In has been continuously operating since and is the oldest gay bar in the city. During the 1890s, the bar was known as Georgia's Tap Room. The current name of the bar comes from Leon Lampe, who owned the bar in the 1930s. The bar survived during Prohibition by operating as a speakeasy and after World War II it became known as a hang-out for artists and beatniks, both gay and straight. Leon's officially became a gay bar in 1957, although the bar had been attracting a gay clientele for many years. In the early days of the bar when homosexuality was illegal and many patrons were closeted, it was custom to ask patrons at the door, "Are you a friend of Dorothy?" This was gay lingo that helped gay men identify each other, referencing Judy Garland's Dorothy Gale character in The Wizard of Oz.

The Hippo, a gay club in Baltimore, announced that it would close in 2015 after 43 years in business.

On June 13, 2016, a candlelight vigil was held at the Ynot lot in Station North to honor the 49 victims of the Orlando nightclub shooting.

In 2018, Baltimore Mayor Catherine Pugh signed an executive order granting recognition of LGBT-owned businesses in Baltimore. This order places LGBT-owned businesses in the same category as women-owned and minority-owned businesses in Baltimore that are granted certain percentages of city incentives and product or service work on city contracts.

Club Bunns, a gay club near Lexington Market that attracted a gay black male clientele, closed in February 2019 after 30 years in business.

In February 2019, a lesbian radical feminist from Baltimore named Julia Beck was removed from Mayor Catherine Pugh's LGBTQ Commission due to her belief that "People who call themselves transgender women are male." Her decision to forgo use of preferred gender pronouns rankled other members of the commission. During the controversy, Beck received death and rape threats. Beck was replaced on the commission by Ava Pipitone, a transgender woman. Pipitone is the executive director of the Baltimore Transgender Alliance (BTA). Pipitone now goes by the name Kodah Pipitone and uses he/him pronouns.

In 2019, one of Baltimore's largest gay nightclubs, Grand Central, announced that it was closing upon purchase by new owners. Grand Central had been located at 1001-1003 N. Charles Street in Mount Vernon.

In March 2019, it was announced that one of the earliest gay gathering spots in Baltimore faces the possibility of demolition. The former Martick’s Restaurant Français, a restaurant that served French cuisine and attracted a bohemian and gay clientele, is now vacant. Once a speakeasy during Prohibition, Martick's has been visited by Billie Holiday, Leonard Bernstein, and John Waters. During the 1950s and 1960s, the restaurant was popular with artists, jazz musicians, gay men, lesbians, bisexuals, crossdressers, transgender and intersex patients of Johns Hopkins Hospital psychologist John Money, and many others. It is one of the oldest pre-Civil War buildings in Baltimore. The building is located at 214 W. Mulberry St. and there are plans to build a 6-story $30 million apartment complex at the site. Efforts to appeal to the Baltimore’s Commission for Historical and Architectural Preservation (CHAP) have been unsuccessful.

== Gayborhood ==
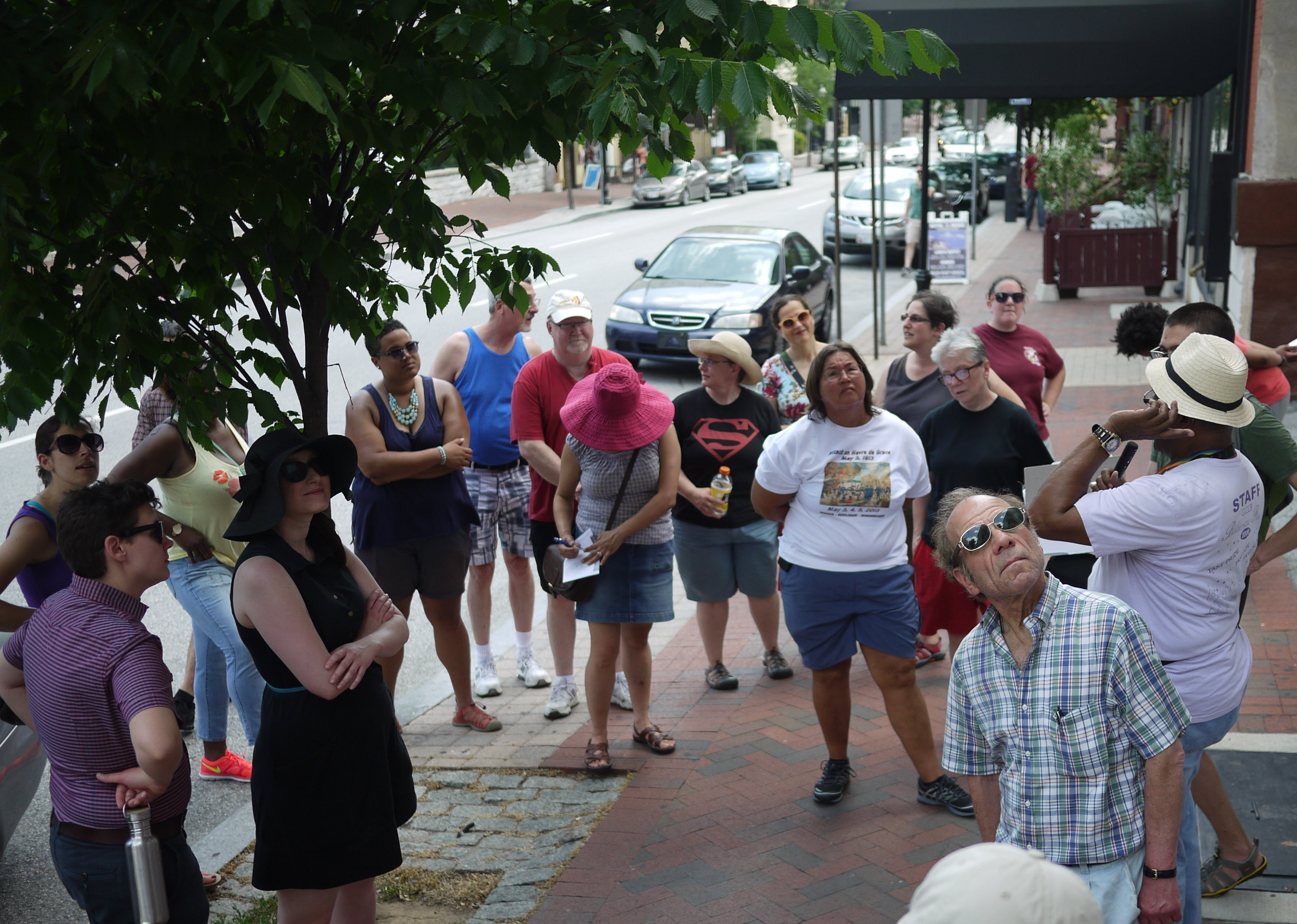
LGBTQ Heritage Tour in Mount Vernon, 2015.

During the 1970s, Mount Vernon began to form into a gay village for Baltimore with the establishment of the Gay and Lesbian Community Center of Baltimore (GLCCB) in 1977, now known as the Pride Center of Maryland. LGBTQ milestones included the first Pride parade in 1975, and the creation of the GLCCB Health Clinic in 1980.

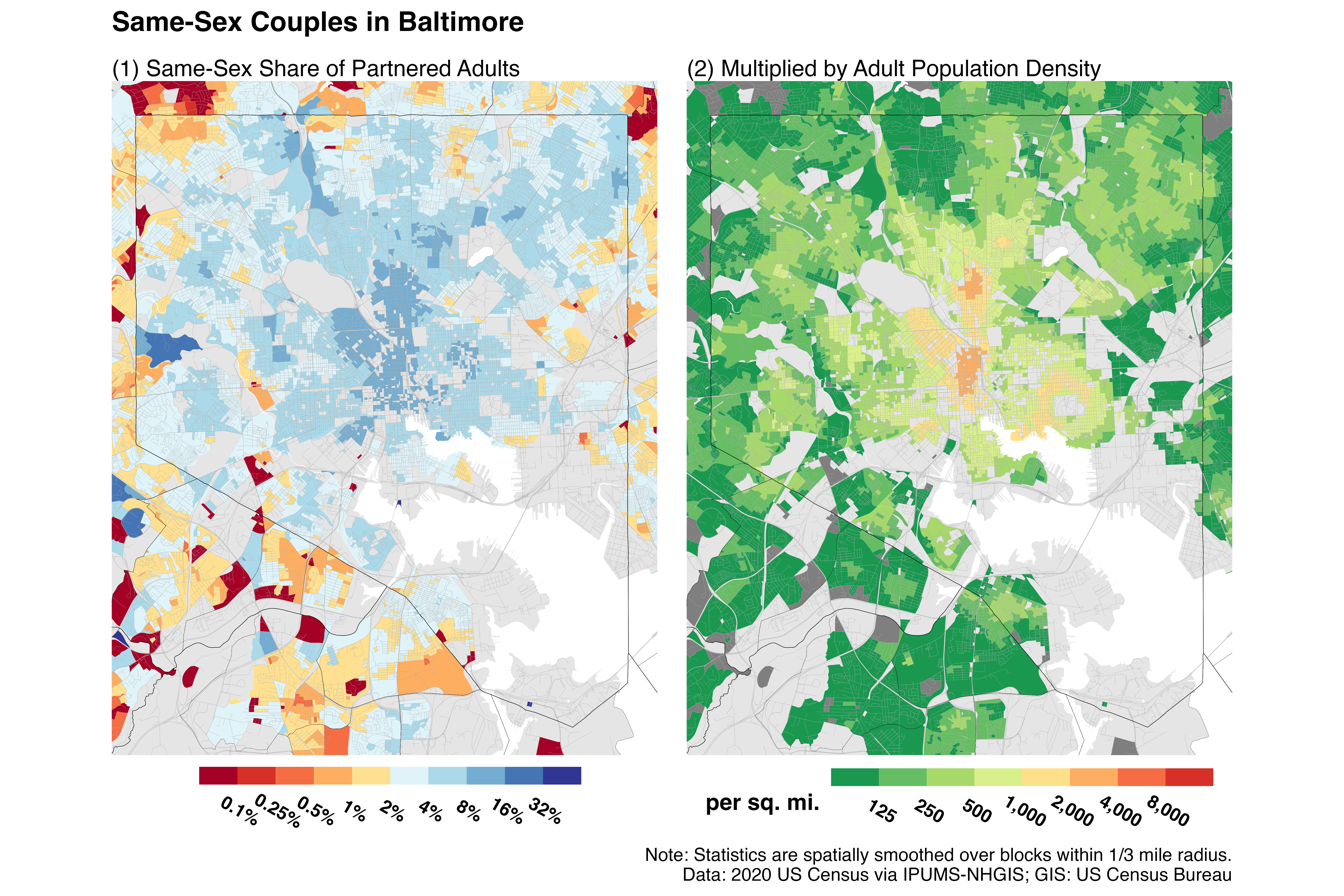
Map of same-sex couples in Baltimore

== Nightlife ==
In 2016, long-running Mount Vernon gay nightclub "The Drinkery" experienced a liquor license battle amidst complaints of noise, crime, and excess trash. Some patrons of the club believed the battle was due to racism and classism in the changing neighborhood that is undergoing rapid gentrification.

While Baltimore historically had a thriving lesbian nightlife scene, most lesbian bars and clubs have shuttered over the years. In 2016, only two lesbian bars remained: Sappho's at Grand Central and The Attic in Mount Vernon. After Grand Central closed in 2020, The Attic remains as the only lesbian nightclub in Baltimore. The Attic is a lounge and dining room in the upstairs of the Flavor bar in Mount Vernon and is open on weekends.

== Film ==
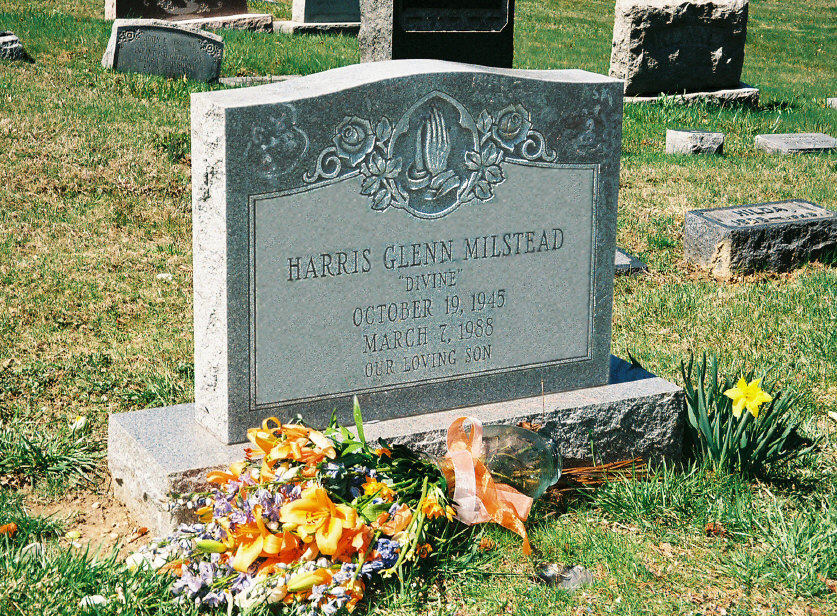
The gravesite of Harris Glenn Milstead (1945 – 1988), better known as the actor Divine at Prospect Hill Cemetery, Towson, Maryland.

- Divine Trash, a 1998 documentary film directed by Steve Yeager about the life and work of John Waters.
- I Am Divine, a 2013 documentary film produced and directed by Jeffrey Schwarz that focuses on the life of actor, singer and drag performer Divine.

== Music and dance ==
Like many other major cities along the Northeastern United States, Baltimore has been home to a predominantly Black and Latino drag ball scene

== Discrimination ==
In May 2019, a hate crime occurred at Same Gender Love, an LGBT-themed shop in Mount Vernon. Two unidentified men set fire to a rainbow flag outside of the boutique. The Baltimore Police Department's criminal intelligence unit and LGBT liaison, along with Central District officers, are investigating the incident.

== LGBT rights ==
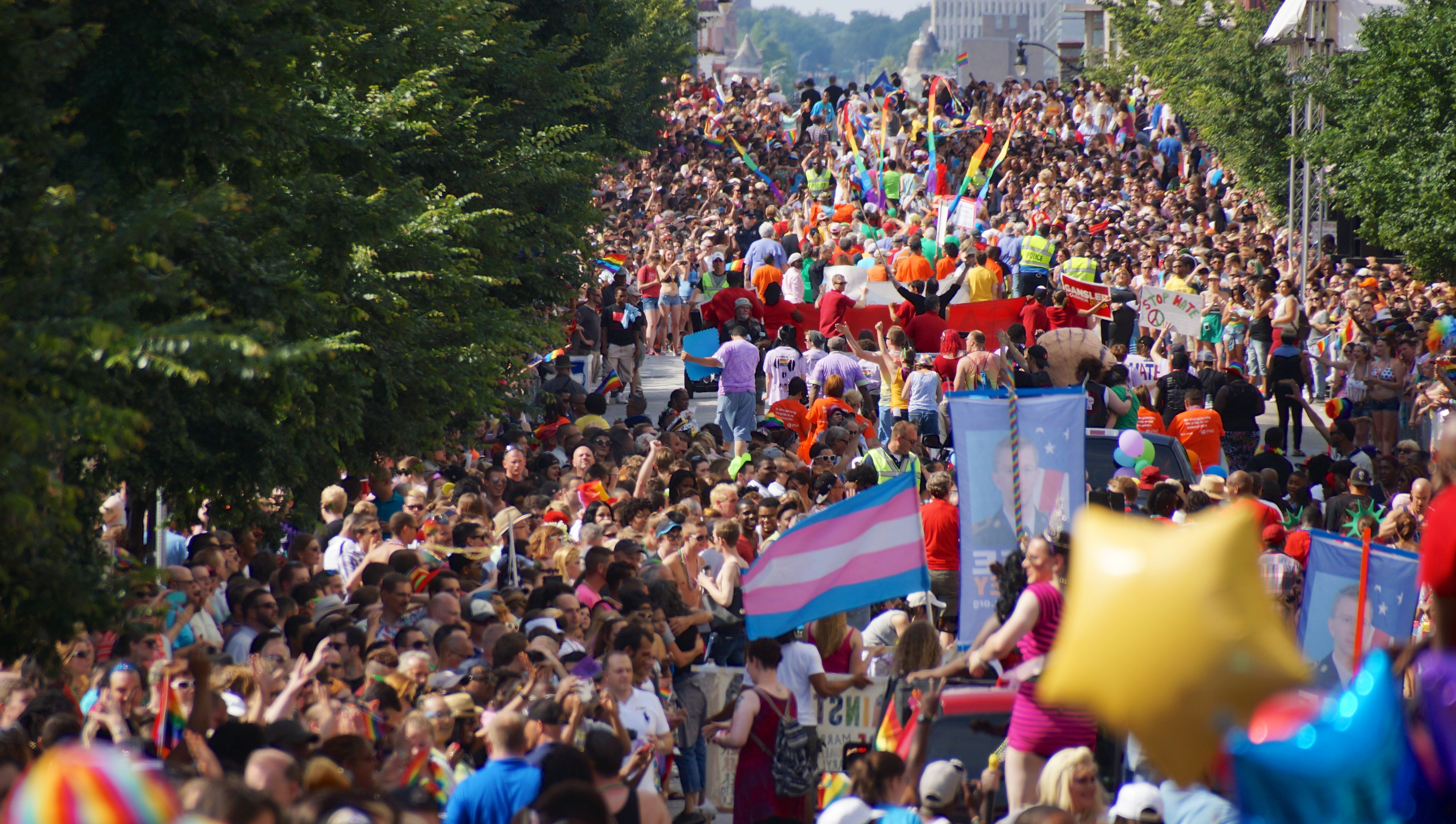
Transgender flag at the Baltimore Pride parade 2013.

In April 2019, the Baltimore City Council unanimously voted to pass a policy allowing transgender and transsexual students to use the names and pronouns of their choosing, as well as usage of restrooms in accordance with a person's gender identity.

== Organizations ==
The Pride Center of Maryland is a nonprofit organization serving the lesbian, gay, bisexual and transgender population of Baltimore and its metropolitan area. The Pride Center offers two groups for lesbians; SILhouette - Spiritually In-tuned Lesbians, a group for religious lesbians; and Sistahs of Pride, a group for lesbians of color. The center also offers several groups for transgender people, including Akanni – Black Transmen, Inc., the Baltimore Trans*Masculine Alliance (BTMA), and Tran*quility (a support group for trans women.

The Portal, now defunct, was a center for LGBT African Americans in the Baltimore metropolitan area.

BPT Charm City (Bi & Proud Together), a Baltimore-based organization that holds a monthly support group for people who identify as bisexual, pansexual, or fluid, was founded in June 2014. The organization was formed to cultivate a space for the bisexual community, due to perceived marginalization from both heterosexuals and LGBT communities.

Due to a lack of support for gay, lesbian, bisexual, and transgender Latinos in Baltimore, an organization called IRIS (Individuality, Respect, Integrity, and Sexuality) was created in 2016 to cater to the LGBT Latino community of Baltimore. Previous programs directed at LGBT Latinos have come and gone, but IRIS is designed to be more permanent. While most LGBT services in Baltimore are in the gayborhood of Mount Vernon, the majority of Baltimore's LGBT Latinos live in Highlandtown alongside their heterosexual Latino peers. In addition to the problem of location, LGBT Latinos face intersectional barriers to access and equality, including immigration status, language fluency, and cultural acceptance.

== Literature and media ==
In 2015, lesbian-feminist activist and historian Louise Parker Kelley published LGBT Baltimore, a pictorial history of Baltimore's LGBT community.

Gay Life, a defunct newspaper about gay culture published by the Pride Center of Maryland. It was distributed in Baltimore and throughout the Mid-Atlantic region. In 2016, Gay Life was purchased from the Pride Center and merged into the LGBT newspaper Baltimore OUTloud.

== Religion ==
=== Christianity ===
Many LGBT people in Baltimore are Christian or come from Christian backgrounds. The Unity Fellowship Church of Baltimore, headed by Reverend Harris Thomas, is a church that serves African-American Christians and other LGBT Christians of color. Unity Fellowship is the local branch of a national movement that caters to LGBT Christians of color. Baltimore's Unity Fellowship Church is located on Old York Road and has a congregation of around 150 people. While homophobia exists within the African-American community, the majority of African-Americans in Maryland are supportive of same-sex marriage.

=== Judaism ===
Baltimore has a large population of LGBT Jews. JQ Baltimore is a Baltimore-based organization that fights for LGBT inclusion within the Jewish community. Mindy Dickler, an Orthodox Jewish mother, co-founded JQ Baltimore after her son came out as gay during Rosh Hashanah. Many Reform, Reconstructionist and Conservative synagogues in Baltimore are accepting of the LGBT community. Rabbi Mark Loeb, senior rabbi at Beth El Congregation, a Conservative synagogue in Baltimore, has welcomed LGBT Jews by stating that "We're telling the community of gay Jews that there are many rabbis in the R.A. inclined to serve them as fellow Jews."

Unlike major metropolitan areas such as New York City and San Francisco, Baltimore has fewer resources for Orthodox Jewish parents of LGBT children. LGBT Orthodox Jewish organizations such as Eshel have tried to fill this gap by organizing meetings and Shabbatons for LGBT Orthodox Jews and their families and supporters.

== People ==
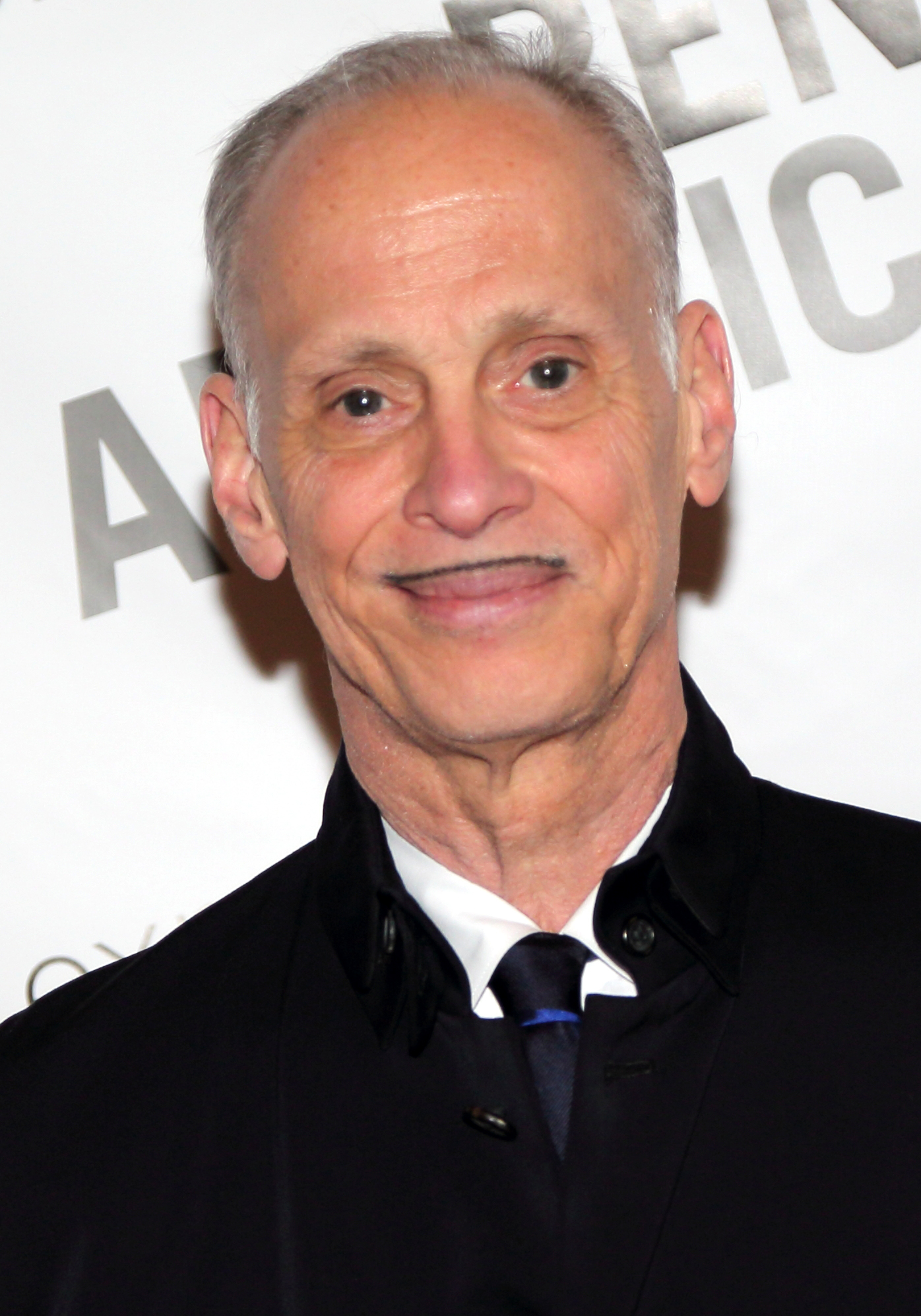
John Waters, a film director, screenwriter, author, actor, stand-up comedian, journalist, visual artist, and art collector, who rose to fame in the early 1970s for his transgressive cult films.

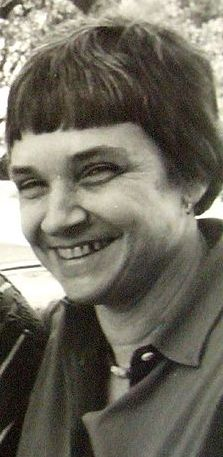
Adrienne Rich, a poet, essayist and lesbian-feminist. She was called "one of the most widely read and influential poets of the second half of the 20th century" and was credited with bringing "the oppression of women and lesbians to the forefront of poetic discourse."

- Jeff Bowen (gay), a composer, lyricist and actor.
- Brian Dannelly (gay), a film director and screenwriter best known for his work on the 2004 film Saved!.
- Kevin Chamberlin (gay), an actor best known for his theatre roles such as Horton in Seussical and Fester in The Addams Family.
- ContraPoints (transgender), a YouTuber of comedic and educational videos about politics, gender, race, and philosophy.
- Kevin Clash (gay), a puppeteer, director and producer whose characters included Elmo, Clifford, Benny Rabbit, and Hoots the Owl.
- Luke Clippinger (gay), a Democratic Delegate representing the state's 46th district in Baltimore.
- Divine (gay), an actor, singer, and drag queen closely associated with the independent filmmaker John Waters.
- Jeffrey Escoffier (gay), a media strategist, writer, editor, and activist.
- L. S. Alexander Gumby (gay), an archivist and historian whose collection of 300 scrapbooks documenting African-American history have been part of the collection of Columbia University.
- Angel McCoughtry (lesbian), a professional basketball player for the Atlanta Dream of the Women's National Basketball Association (WNBA).
- DeRay Mckesson (gay), a Black Lives Matter activist, podcaster, and former school administrator.
- Maggie McIntosh (lesbian), a Democratic politician who represents the state's 43rd district in Baltimore City.
- Ken Mehlman (gay), a social entrepreneur, businessman, and Republican Party official.
- Pauli Murray (lesbian), a civil rights activist who became a lawyer, a women's rights activist, an author, and the first African-American woman to be ordained as an Episcopal priest.
- Frank O'Hara (gay), a writer, poet, and art critic.
- Isaac Oliver (gay), is an author, playwright and on-stage comic known for his debut humor collection.
- Chet Pancake (queer), a filmmaker, musician, and activist against mountaintop removal mining who co-founded the Red Room Collective, the High Zero Foundation, the Charm City Kitty Club and the Transmodern Festival.
- Arlene Raven, a lesbian-feminist art historian, author, critic, educator, and curator.
- Adrienne Rich, a poet, essayist and lesbian-feminist who was called "one of the most widely read and influential poets of the second half of the 20th century."
- Neena Schwartz (lesbian), an endocrinologist and William Deering Professor of Endocrinology Emerita in the Department of Neurobiology at Northwestern University.
- Serpentwithfeet (gay), a Baltimore-born experimental musician based in Brooklyn, New York.
- Mary Sherwood (lesbian), a physician, educator, and spokesperson for preventive medicine, public health, women's health, childcare.
- André De Shields (gay), an African-American actor, singer, director, dancer, novelist, choreographer, lyricist, composer, and professor.
- Breanna Sinclairé, a transgender singer who became the first transgender woman to sing the American national anthem at a professional sporting event.
- Alex Somers (gay), a visual artist and musician.
- Mary L. Washington (lesbian), a Democratic politician elected in 2018 to the Maryland Senate to represent the state's 43rd district.
- John Waters (gay), a film director, author, and stand-up comedian who rose to fame in the early 1970s for his transgressive cult films.
- Raymond Weaver (gay), a professor of English and comparative literature at Columbia University and literary scholar best known for publishing Herman Melville: Mariner and Mystic.
- Lilian Welsh (lesbian), a physician, educator, suffragist, and advocate for women's health.
- Y-Love (gay), a Jewish hip-hop artist, formerly Hasidic, whose lyrics cover social, political and religious themes.

== See also ==
- LGBT culture in Philadelphia
- LGBT culture in Washington, D.C.
