= Letitia Dzirasa =

American pediatrician

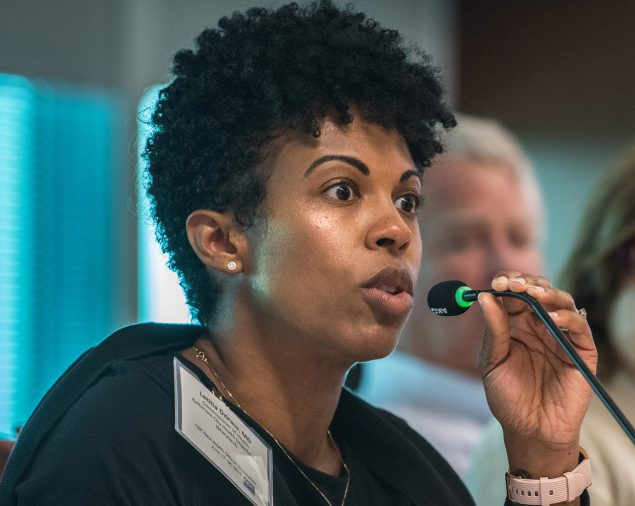
- Dzirasa in 2019

Deputy Mayor of Baltimore for Equity, Health, and Human Services
- Incumbent
- Assumed office July 2025
- Appointed by: Brandon Scott
- Preceded by: J.D. Merrill
- Interim
- In office May 1, 2023 – June 5, 2024
- Preceded by: Faith Leach
- Succeeded by: J.D. Merrill

Commissioner of the Baltimore City Health Department
- In office March 11, 2019 – April 30, 2023
- Appointed by: Catherine Pugh
- Preceded by: Mary Beth Haller (interim)
- Succeeded by: Ihuoma Emenuga

Personal details
- Born: 1981 (age 44–45)
- Education: University of Maryland, Baltimore County; Meharry Medical College

Letitia Dzirasa (born c. 1981) is an American pediatrician and public health official currently serving as Baltimore City's Deputy Mayor of Equity, Health, and Human Services. She returned to this role in July 2025 after previously serving from May 2023 to June 2024. Prior to becoming deputy mayor, Dzirasa was commissioner of the Baltimore City Health Department from 2019 to 2023, where she was the first African American woman to hold the position and led the city's response to the COVID-19 pandemic in Maryland.

== Early life and education ==
Dzirasa was born c. 1981. She attended the University of Maryland, Baltimore County (UMBC), where she was a Meyerhoff Scholar and conducted public health research at Johns Hopkins University as an undergraduate. Dzirasa credits LaMont Toliver, a former director of the Meyerhoff Scholars Program, with strengthening her passion for public service. She graduated from UMBC in 2003 with a B.A. in biological sciences. In 2007, she earned a M.D., summa cum laude, from Meharry Medical College. Dzirasa completed a pediatric residency at Johns Hopkins Hospital.

== Career ==
Dzirasa worked as a general pediatrician at Johns Hopkins Community Physicians. She later served as the medical director of school-based health for the Baltimore Medical System, a non-profit organization that provides care for uninsured and underinsured patients.

Dzirasa co-founded the software company Fearless Solutions with her husband, Delali Dzirasa. She served as the company's health innovation officer, managing its healthcare IT portfolio and leading business development for its healthcare practice. In 2016, Fearless developed tools for Baltimore City to analyze health trends and help the health department allocate resources more effectively.

=== Baltimore City government ===
In February 2019, Baltimore mayor Catherine Pugh appointed Dzirasa to serve as Baltimore's health commissioner. She succeeded interim commissioner Mary Beth Haller, who had filled the role after Leana Wen left to lead Planned Parenthood. Dzirasa began the role on March 11 and was officially sworn in on April 16, 2019, becoming the first African American woman to hold the position. As commissioner, she oversaw a department with an annual budget of $150 million and approximately 800 employees. Her initial priorities included addressing youth violence, food deserts, and the opioid epidemic. She also focused on implementing trauma-informed care in city schools, an approach that trains educators to recognize and address the effects of trauma on children. In this effort, Dzirasa said she was collaborated with City Council members Zeke Cohen and Brandon Scott.

Dzirasa's tenure as health commissioner was largely defined by her leadership during the COVID-19 pandemic in Maryland. She was credited with establishing systems that resulted in better outcomes for Baltimore compared to similar cities. A 2021 study from the Johns Hopkins Bloomberg School of Public Health found that Baltimore residents were less likely to become sick or die from COVID-19 and more likely to be vaccinated than residents in peer cities.

In April 2023, mayor Brandon Scott appointed Dzirasa to serve as the interim Deputy Mayor of Equity, Health, and Human Services, a position she started on May 1, 2023. In this role, she oversaw the Mayor's Offices of Homeless Services, African American Male Engagement, Children and Family Success, and Parks and Recreation. She served in this capacity until June 5, 2024, when she left to take a break from public service. After a brief hiatus, Dzirasa was reappointed to succeed J.D. Merrill as Deputy Mayor for Equity, Health, and Human Services in July 2025.

== Personal life ==
Dzirasa is married to Delali Dzirasa, with whom she co-founded Fearless Solutions.

== See also ==
- List of African-American women in medicine
