= Udel =

Udel may refer to:

- a Russian feudal term for an appanage principality given to a younger son of a prince
- UDel, an abbreviation for the University of Delaware
- Udel (polymer), high-temperature polymer
- Joan Erbe Udel (1926–2014), U.S. artist
