= John Corbett Eason =

John Corbett Eason Jr.
- Born: January 1, 1914; Richmond, Virginia (U.S.)
- Died: February 15, 2012 (aged 98); Washington, D.C. (U.S.)
- Spouse: Janice S. Wood
- Children: 1
- Military career
- Branch: United States Public Health Service Commissioned Corps
- Service years: 1943-1974
- Rank: Captain

John Corbett Eason Jr. was the first African American to be a commissioned officer in the U.S. Public Health Service Commissioned Corps.

== Early life ==
John C. Eason was born in Richmond, Virginia on 1 January 1914. He graduated from Virginia Union University with a bachelor's degree in 1934. He completed his master's degree in chemistry from Howard University in 1936.

== USPHS career ==
Lieutenant Junior Grade Eason was commissioned as an assistant sanitarian for the Baltimore City Health Department in 1943. His work as a sanitarian included Malaria control, water purification, sewage management, food sanitation and insect control. In the modern USPHS, the office is now called Environmental Health Officer. In 1945, he became the liaison officer to the U.S. mission to Liberia assigned to the Office of International Health (OIH). He would work for the Louisville-Jefferson County Health Department, Kentucky State Health Department and the Illinois Health Department. He would eventually become the Executive Associate Director of the Office of International Health.

He retired as a captain in 1974.

== Later career and personal life ==
He was married to Janice S. Wood and has a son John C. Eason, III. He worked with international health programs for the American Public Health Association.

== Death ==
Captain Eason died 15 February 2012 in Washington, D.C.

== Honors ==
The USAID camp in Monrovia, Liberia, site of the Monrovia Medical Unit (MMU), was named Camp Eason in 2014. It was a 25-bed field hospital that provided care specifically for healthcare responders who became infected with the Ebola virus. The hospital was closed in 2015.

The Black Commissioned Officers Advisory Group (BCOAG) established the CAPT John C. Eason Jr. Scholarship for high school students who are preparing for health careers. The BCOAG also created the John C. Eason Responder of the Year Award recognizing contributions to the USPHS Commissioned Corps during critical public health events either domestically or internationally.

The National Environmental Health Association established the John C. Eason Uniformed Services Award.
