= Martick's Restaurant Francais =

Former restaurant in Baltimore, Maryland

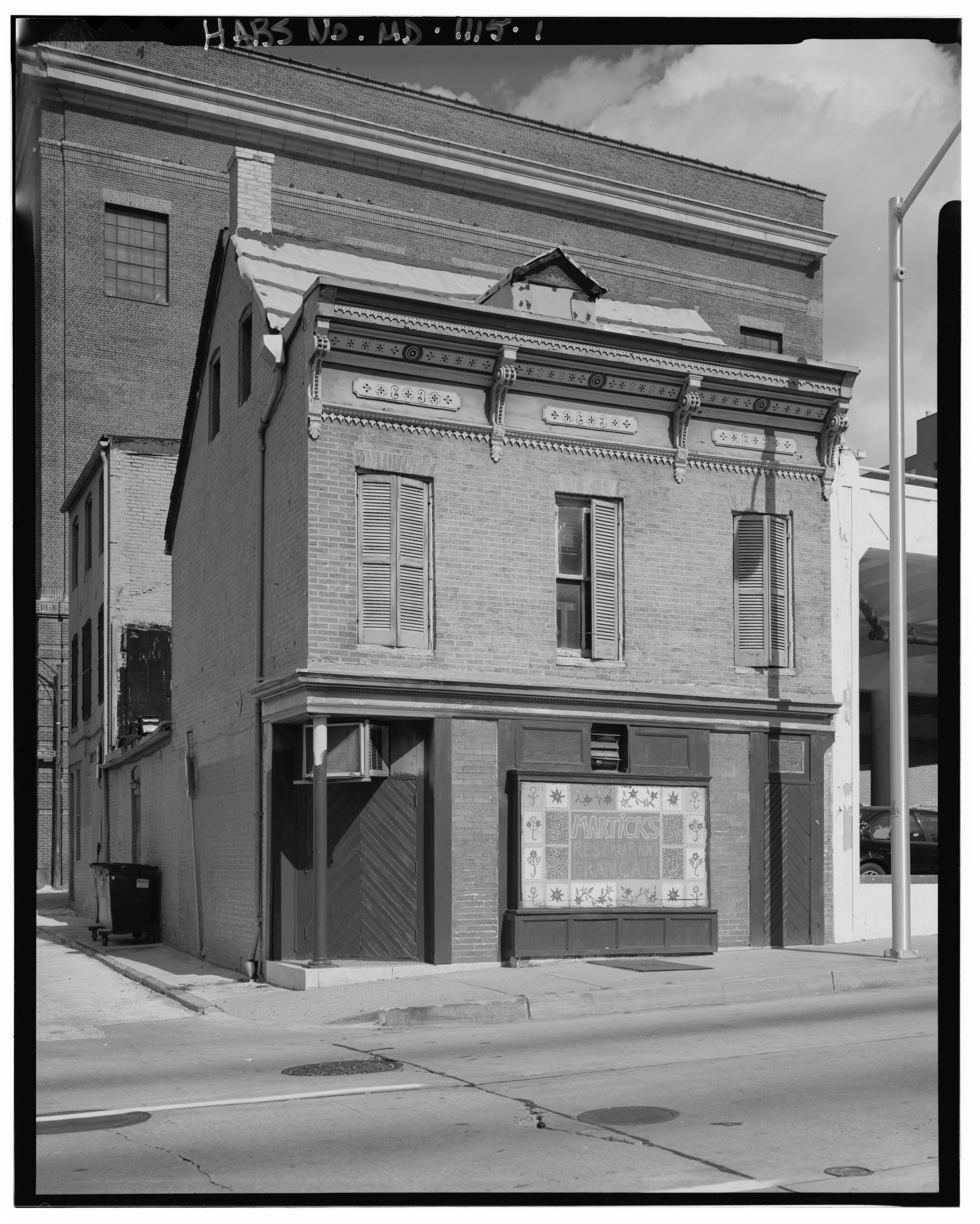
- Martick's Restaurant Francais, prior to closure

- Location within Baltimore

Restaurant information
- Established: 1970
- Closed: 2008
- Previous owner: Morris Martick
- Chef: Morris Martick
- Food type: French cuisine
- Location: 214 West Mulberry St, Baltimore, Maryland
- Coordinates: 39°17′38.75″N 76°37′08.10″W

Martick's Restaurant Francais (previously known as Martick's Lower Tyson Street Tavern) is a defunct restaurant and historic building in Downtown Baltimore, Maryland. The 2,860 square-foot Federal style building was built no later than 1852. After serving a variety of uses over the decades, the structure opened as a French restaurant on July 9, 1970. Over its decades as a bar and restaurant, Martick's was known as an artists' refuge, "a tiny isle of Bohemia set in a conservative city." So steeped in the particular culture of its city in the 20th century, the restaurant was referred to as "the Natty Boh of French dining in Baltimore."

The building is located within the city's Bromo Arts District, and is within the Market Center district listed in the National Register of Historic Places, as well as the locally designated Howard Street Commercial Historic District. While not itself a designated landmark, Martick's was one of the historic structures used to justify the Howard Street district when it was proposed in 2018. Writing in the context of the demolition of many of its neighboring buildings (both in the 20th and 21st centuries), a 2018 Baltimore Commission for Historical and Architectural Preservation (CHAP) report described Martick's as "the only remaining vestige of the historic appearance of the street."

== Early history ==
The rowhouse at 214 West Mulberry Street was built between the 1830s and 1850s. Converted to a storefront around the turn of the 20th century, Yiddish-speaking Polish Jewish immigrants Harry and Florence Martick purchased the building as a grocery store in 1917. During Prohibition, the Marticks ran a clandestine speakeasy out of the store. Their son, Morris Martick, would later report that they kept bootleg gin and whiskey under the floorboards of the bathroom. Harry was imprisoned for a year for violations of the Volstead Act.

After the repeal of Prohibition in 1933, the Marticks applied for and received a liquor license. They used this to convert the grocery into a corner bar, known to some patrons as the Mahogany Tavern.

== Martick's Lower Tyson Street Tavern ==
In the late 1940s, taking ownership over from his parents, Morris Martick renamed the bar Martick's Tyson Street Tavern or Martick's Lower Tyson Street Tavern. He expanded beyond the traditional scope of a corner bar by bringing in such events as silent movie nights, chess tournaments and live jazz bands. Martick opened a nearby art gallery (Salon Des Refuses) down the street at 108 West Mulberry Street. The gallery served the art of many of his patrons who could not be accepted in more mainstream galleries. He eventually began allowing artists to feature their art in the bar itself, a rarity at the time, and the first in the city to do so. Shows at Martick's eventually brought critical attention to fledgling artists like Joan Erbe.

By the 1950s, Martick's was viewed as "Baltimore's intellectual meeting place" and one of "the roots of Baltimore bohemian culture." Leonard Bernstein, on visits to the city, was known to play the bar's piano. Billie Holiday, in the final years of her life, visited Martick's and sang with the house jazz band. Not associated simply with jazz performers, even Hank Williams was documented as having played at Martick's during this era.

The bar was open to gays, at a time when this was still uncommon in the city (and country). As early as the 1950s, the bar was known as an important gathering place for "not only gay men and women but other members of what is now called the LGBTQ+ community, including bisexuals, crossdressers and people undergoing sex change operations by Johns Hopkins Hospital physician John Money." Martick's is also cited as "one of the first integrated bars in Baltimore," existing as such even while de jure segregation was still in effect in the city. In later years, Martick would state in interviews that the tavern had not in fact been integrated while Jim Crow was still on the books, but this is contradicted by other late statements of his about that time, that he "served anyone who came in [and] didn't worry about their race." A former employee summarized the ethos of Martick's in the 1950s and 1960s as one where "you weren’t defined by your sexuality or your skin tone."

The bar also drew a clientele of diverse professions, from newspaper and radio men (Russell Baker, J. Anthony Lukas, Louis Rukeyser, Harley Brinsfield) to local and national artists (Joan Erbe, May Wilson, Raoul Middleman). Future film director John Waters frequented the area before he was of legal drinking age, loitering in the alley and depending on regulars to sneak him drinks. Waters, who visited with his friend, the future drag icon Divine, found Martick's a formative location for the group of artists that would eventually become known as the Dreamlanders. It was at Martick's that Waters met Pat Moran, with whom he would collaborate on all of his feature films. It was also where Waters first met actor and projectionist George Figgs. Maelcum Soul, yet another early Waters collaborator, was a Martick's bartender, and also the subject of an art show there in 1965, featuring 25 portraits of her in the nude.

Meanwhile, the neighborhood around Martick's continued to evolve: originally part of a block of rowhouses, by 1950 the building at 214 West Mulberry Street was the last building of this type left on the block. In the mid-1960s, Martick closed the Tavern, stating in an interview that he "didn't care for the drunks and the bums" in the changing neighborhood. Despite the Tavern's prestige among the arts community, Martick would reflect back on it in a 1981 interview as merely "a crummy bar... I mean a crummy one."

== Martick's Restaurant Francais ==
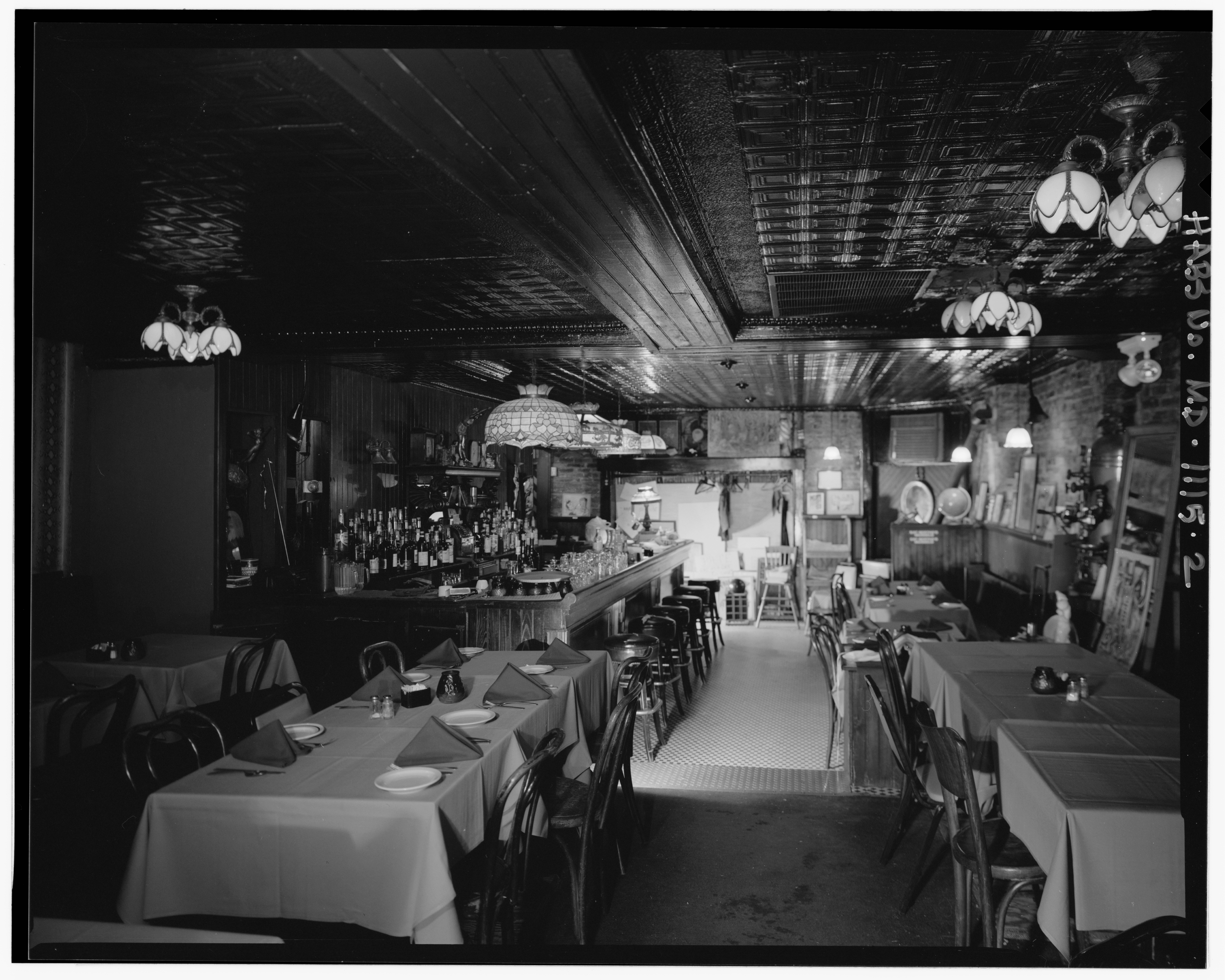
An undated interior photo of Martick's Restaurant Francais

Following the closure of the bar, Morris Martick traveled to the Normandy region of France to seek training in French cuisine. Opening July 9, 1970, after two years of renovation, the new Martick's Restaurant Francais boasted of being the first French restaurant in Baltimore.

Initially, the restaurant attempted to affect the trappings of a traditional French restaurant, with waiters in tuxedos, a maitre'd and an authentically French chef from Paris. However, in short order, the chef was gone and Morris Martick himself took the reins in the kitchen. Taking on the bohemian character of the bar which had previously inhabited it, as well as the proprietor, Martick's restaurant was noted for its eclectic decor - snakeskin wallpaper, stained glass, hubcaps, bowling balls and plastic baby dolls hanging from wires. This decor was entirely the work of Morris Martick. John Waters, now old enough to drink, remained a frequent patron. For this and other reasons, it gained a reputation as "one of Baltimore's quirkier restaurants."

Over the years Martick and his restaurant became famous for a few dishes, particularly the pâté, profiteroles, bouillabaisse.

Due to a car crash, as well as security concerns, the storefront window and entrance were boarded up at some point in the 1970s. As the neighborhood continued to decline, the building was among those listed in city ordinances in June 1998 and May 1999 that permitted the city to take ownership of as part of an urban renewal scheme. Under a pact with the Maryland Historical Trust, then-Mayor Martin O'Malley arranged to protect many of those buildings, including Martick's.

== Closure and legacy ==
Martick closed the restaurant in August or September 2008. At the time, he was receiving citations from Baltimore Housing inspections regarding flaking paint and lack of zoning permits. Martick continued to live in the building until his death on December 16, 2011. The building then passed into the hands of his family.

Even after its closure, Martick's has remained a frequent mention as one of Baltimore's "iconic eateries of yesteryear", and one of its "traditional destinations." Particularly after Morris Martick's passing in 2011, a number of articles described the building and restaurant as "a hub of city artistic life," and "utterly unlike anywhere else."

== Failed revivals ==
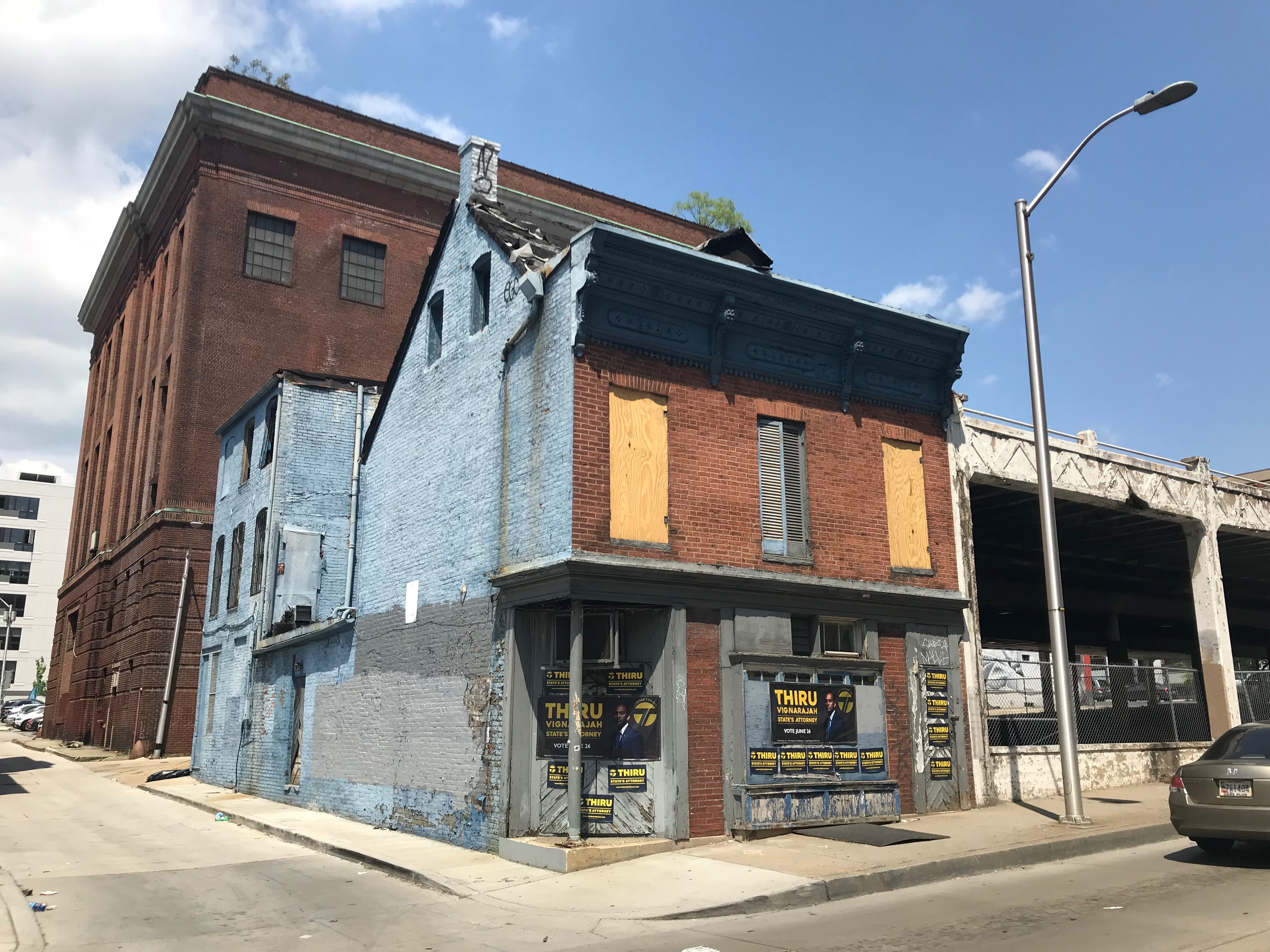
214 West Mulberry following the closure of Martick's

In December 2012, it was reported that the property was to be redeveloped as an imitation speakeasy-style bar, following a popular trend at the time. The plan for the new establishment, to be called Martick's, was partially spearheaded by Alex Martick, Morris Martick's brother. Initially predicted to open in February 2013, later this was pushed to August. Plans for the revival evidently were abandoned by December 2013 though, as the owners of the license transferred it to another club in nearby Harlem Park. In 2014, revival again seemed imminent, as the city's liquor board approved a new liquor license, to feature live entertainment.

Despite the buzz of the previous year, the building was subject to a Vacant Building Notice as of 2015. In the same year, Baltimore architecture firm Murphy Dittenhafer proposed a large-scale redevelopment of the entire block in a plan which would have worked around the existing building at 214 West Mulberry, and in fact depicted it in their concept renderings of the larger project. In that case, the building was not part of their RFP submission since, unlike the rest of the block, the city did not own it.

In April 2018, the building was sold to developer Jabber Five who announced yet another plan to revive it as an "eclectic, artsy eatery." The developers had initially planned to demolish the building, but changed their mind after being informed of the building's historic heritage. Jabber Five's new plan was to have a restaurant downstairs, with an artist live-work space above. These plans too fell through, and the building was sold in December 2018 to Park Avenue Partners.

== Planned redevelopment and demolition ==
In December 2018, Park Avenue Partners, LLC proposed to build a six-story mixed-use apartment and retail building with 115 units at the site of the former Martick's. The developers framed their plan as part of a rejuvenation of the historic Baltimore Chinatown, with a stated intention of encouraging Asian restaurateurs and entrepreneurs to occupy the space. The developer claims they attempted to integrate the historic building into the development plan, but ultimately requested approval to demolish it. The adjacent 1950s-era parking deck was approved for demolition and had already been removed in 2018. The interior of the building had been described as "gutted" by its previous owners in April 2018. The developers argued that the structure at 214 West Mulberry was too degraded at this point, suffering from water damage, crumbling masonry and mold.

At the January 18, 2019 hearing of the city's CHAP, the staff recommendation was made that the Martick's building be determined to contribute to the historic Howard Street Commercial District. They based its historical significance upon three criteria: the building's significant contributions to the "commercial history of Baltimore's historic retail core," the building's "association with Morris Martick" himself, and the building's significant "architecture as an example of a modest early-19th century side gable Federal style building that was later modernized with Italianate details." The CHAP staff made the recommendation that the developer attempt to incorporate "all or a portion of the building" into any new development plans.

At the February 12, 2019 hearing of CHAP, the developer again applied for demolition, arguing "retaining and rehabilitating the historic building will create a financial hardship." The developer submitted six scenarios to CHAP, from full rehabilitation of the structure to its complete razing, and attempted to make the case that retention of the building would not be economically feasible. They argued a restoration of the building would cost 1.1 million dollars. The proposal touched off what the Baltimore Sun described as a "spontaneous revolt" among attendees to the hearing. Community activists, as well as the director of Baltimore Heritage argued for a postponement of approval at a minimum, citing questions about how the financial feasibility had been calculated by the developer. The Baltimore Development Corporation, the Downtown Partnership of Baltimore and the Market Center Merchants Association submitted written support for the demolition. The demolition also has the support of the president of the Baltimore City Council. Despite these endorsements, CHAP staff recommended a finding that the developer did not adequately demonstrate that retaining all or some portion of the building would be a significant financial hardship, and recommended disapproval of the request for the full demolition of the building. The CHAP committee postponed a final decision for a later hearing a month later.

The Park Avenue Partners development group returned in early March with a proposal to restore and retain the front third of the Martick's building, in exchange for permission to tear down the remainder. The revised proposal followed consultation with CHAP representatives and others who favored preservation. At the March 12, 2019 meeting of CHAP, the committee voted 9–0 to approve this compromise plan, which retains the older portion of the structure, while tearing down the later (although still 19th century) construction in rear. The developer stated that carrying out this modified plan would be contingent on raising approximately $300,000 in additional funds, which they planned to explore raising with a non-profit partner. While the consent from the committee was unanimous, it was opposed by the Mount Vernon Belvedere Association and members of the community, who presented a petition asking the entire building to be retained. Johns Hopkins, head of Baltimore Heritage, supported the arrangement, seeing the retained portion as the "core" of the former restaurant and "the best shot we have at saving Martick’s."
