= Bromo Arts District =

Arts district in Baltimore, Maryland

Coordinates: 39.2875°N 76.620833°W

The Bromo Arts District.

Bromo Arts District is one of four designated arts districts in Baltimore, Maryland, centered on the Emerson Bromo-Seltzer Tower, which houses artists' studios. The district is roughly bounded by Park Avenue on the east, Lombard Street on the south, Paca Street on the west and Martin Luther King Jr. Boulevard and Read Street on the north and is adjacent to the neighborhoods of Mount Vernon and downtown Baltimore. It is home to the University of Maryland Medical Center, Lexington Market, Westminster Hall and Edgar Allan Poe's gravesite, the former Martick's Restaurant Francais and many cultural institutions including the Hippodrome Theatre, the Everyman Theatre, and the Eubie Blake National Jazz and Cultural Center. It is also home to A.T. Jones and Sons, the oldest costume company in the United States.

The official name of the organization is The Bromo Tower Arts and Entertainment District. The offices are located in the Maryland Art Place building located at 218 W. Saratoga Street.

== History ==
The Bromo Arts District became a state-designated Arts & Entertainment District on July 1, 2012. In October 2013, Priya Bhayana was hired as the district's inaugural executive director.

In October 2016, Stephen Yasko took over leadership from Bhayana. Yasko was previously the founding General Manager and Executive Director of WTMD 89.7 FM.

The current executive director is Emily Breiter, who has been in the position since 2020. Under Breiner's leadership, the district established Bromo Art Walk, a free biannual event showcasing organizations and creative offerings within the district.

== Organizations ==
Bromo Arts District is home to art organizations, galleries, performance venues, studios, theaters, museums, and art suppliers.

=== Current organizations ===
- Arena Players
- Artstar Custom Paintworks
- Ballet After Dark
- Baltimore Jazz Alliance
- Black Genius Art Show
- Blakwater House
- Bromo Seltzer Arts Tower
- CFG Bank Arena
- Cotyledon Arts
- Current Space
- Destination 4Ever
- Downtown Cultural Art Center
- Eubie Blake Cultural Center
- Everyman Theatre
- Gallery 410
- G. Krug & Son
- Hippodrome Theatre
- Keur Khaleyi African Dance Company
- Le Mondo
- Lineup Room
- Making Space Bmore
- Maryland Art Place
- Maryland Center for History and Culture
- Media Rhythm Institute
- Neon Paint Place
- Red Giant
- Refocused Space
- R.I.S.E Arts Center of Baltimore
- The Crow's Nest
- Westminster Hall & Poe Grave Site
- WombWork Productions

=== Former organizations ===
- 14 Karat Cabaret
- Baltimore Annex Theater
- Charm City Fringe Festival
- Dance Baltimore
- EMP Collective
- Gallery Four
- H&H Building
- Jordan Faye Contemporary
- Maryland Women's Heritage Center
- Market Center Merchants Association
- MUSE 360
- NoMuNoMu
- Nudashank
- Open Space
- Resort
- Rock 512Devil
- Sophiajacob
- SubBasement Artist Studios
- Terrault
- The Whole Gallery

== Public art ==
A number of public artworks are available to view within the district:

- Articulate Baltimore
- Bromo Mural
- Diamonds
- Doll House
- Dragon
- Flavored Water and Corned Beef Sandwiches
- Flock
- Food Play
- Home at Lexington Market
- Lotus Flag
- LOVE
- Maryland Center for History and Culture Mural
- Mother and Child
- Ode To Jaan
- Redwood Arch
- Robert & Rosetta
- Swimming in Baltimore
- The Ashley Mural
- The Build Up
