= Pride Center of Maryland =

Nonprofit organization

Coordinates: 39°18′5″N 76°37′10″W

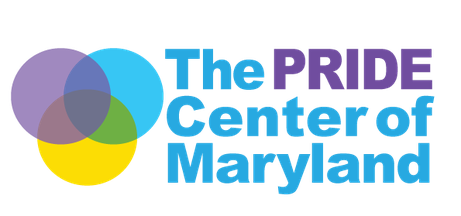
- Founded: 1977; 49 years ago
- Founder: Paulette Young
- Type: nonprofit organization
- Tax ID no.: 52-1112541
- Legal status: 501(c)(3)
- Purpose: To achieve equality, understanding, and respect for the diversity of the greater Baltimore GLBT community while also providing quality support services, facilities, and professional resources for the LGBT community.
- Location: 2418 St. Paul St., Baltimore, Maryland, United States
- Region served: Baltimore and Central Maryland
- President: Merrick Moses
- Executive Director: Mimi Demissew
- Revenue: $595,792 (2017)
- Expenses: $493,282 (2017)
- Employees: 10 (2017)
- Website: www.pridecentermd.org
- Formerly called: Gay Community Center of Baltimore

The Pride Center of Maryland, formerly the Gay, Lesbian, Bisexual, and Transgender Community Center of Baltimore and Central Maryland, is a 501(c)(3) nonprofit organization serving the lesbian, gay, bisexual and transgender population of Baltimore and the Baltimore metropolitan area, located at 2418 Saint Paul Street in Baltimore.

== History ==
The Community Center was founded in 1977 as the Gay Community Center of Baltimore (GCCB). The Center was co-founded by Paulette Young, who became the Center's first president. The other co-founders of the Center were James Becker, Paul Bennett, Jim Childress, Jeffrey Dames, Shawn Dougherty, Howard Gaas, Eddie Hall, Charles Hughes, David Kammer, Tom Miggs, Dana Rethmeyer, Harvey Schwartz, Norman Thomas, Kathy Valentine and Silas White. In March, 1978, the Center rented a building at 2133 Maryland Avenue and within a month under the auspices of the Center, the Baltimore Health Clinic opened for business. The grand opening of the Center took place on Maryland Avenue on June 12, 1978.

By early 1979, with charitable funding from the community, the GCCB purchased a building at 241-243 West Chase Street. It was one of the first LGBT centers that was owned by the LGBT community. The building had been a four-story warehouse and total renovation of the building was required as the existing structure was simply a shell, with little or no electricity, plumbing, insulation, heating or stairways. With volunteer help from the community, the Center's renovation took place and the building housed administrative offices, a newspaper, rooms for LGBT groups and a floor designated for social/entertainment functions, along with a switchboard.

In 1980, the existing services which the Center provided were: an information, help and referral hotline which operated from 3 p.m. until midnight, a medical clinic which bean with the aid of the Baltimore City Health Department which operated twice a week. The services were expanded from being primarily a VD clinic to offering gynecological and other primary health services. Counseling services were provided staffed by professional counselors which operated twice a week on both a drop-in and appointment basis. Periodic forums were held on a wide variety of topics which served an educational purposes both the LGBT community and the general public. A library of education materials, books, periodicals, newspapers, research materials is still a part of the center's legacy. A speaker's bureau, and community outreach services were deemed as a necessity from the beginning of the vision by the original co-founders.

The Center published Gay Life, a Baltimore newspaper that focuses on gay culture, until 2016 when it was merged with Baltimore Outloud.

In 2019, the community center changed its name to the Pride Center of Maryland.

== See also ==
- List of LGBT community centers
- Moveable Feast (organization)
