= Save a Heart Foundation =

Non-profit organization in Baltimore (est. 1971)

The Save a Heart Foundation of Baltimore was created in 1971 by Bernard Sapperstein. The foundation's mission is to raise funds through fund-raising and donations to finance the purchase of equipment that would help to save the lives of people with heart disease.

Save a Heart is a nonprofit organization; since its inception, it has collected more than 8 million dollars; the donations have made possible the installation of care units in hospitals and the purchase of cardiac equipment for schools and police departments, among others.

The Save a Heart Foundation has relied on lifelong donators, such as Mr. Sapperstein, its founder, who almost died of coronary disease; Mrs. John T. Anick, who had a heart transplant in 1968 - she was given the heart of a 30-year-old man in the state of brain death; and Dr. Israel S. Zinberg. Being celebrated as one of the founders, he was granted the Humanitarian award for all his services to the foundation, and to the community.

The Foundation's efforts are not only focused on providing equipment to public places but also on getting involved with the community and teaching the population the basics on how to avoid cardiac diseases in general.

The foundation had made contributions to several important public organizations, including but not limited to: Johns Hopkins Bayview Medical Center (Projector for the Division of Cardiology), Mt. Washington Pediatric Hospital (Cardio Respiratory monitors for premature babies and children with cardiac and lung problems), North Charles General Hospital (formerly Homewood Hospital, cardiac equipment including telemetry and monitors).

== See also ==
- Moveable Feast (organization)
