= Moveable Feast (organization) =

Food providing nonprofit organization Baltimore, Maryland

- Moveable Feast logo
- Formation: 1990
- Legal status: Active
- Purpose: "Moveable Feast provides nutritious foods and other services in order to preserve quality of life for people with HIV/AIDS and other life-threatening conditions."
- Location: Baltimore, Maryland
- Official language: English
- Website: Official website

Moveable Feast is a nonprofit organization based in Baltimore, Maryland, which provides food and services to individuals suffering from HIV/AIDS, breast cancer, and those afflicted with terminal illness. Its founder Baltimore City Health Department official Robert Mehl recognized a need in the community for such services during the epidemic of HIV/AIDS in the United States. He assembled a committee at the direction of then-Baltimore mayor Kurt Schmoke, and the organization was founded in 1990. In its first year the organization's staff of three provided food and services to 60 clients biweekly and twice per day. By 2001 this had increased to attending to the nutrition needs of about 550 people in the region.

In 2003, the organization launched a program to train people with culinary skills which they could then apply towards gaining employment in the workforce. Trainees in the program included prisoners on parole, homeless shelters, and halfway houses; it graduated 11 people in 2004. By 2004 its staff had grown to 32 with additional volunteers, and gave food to 700 people five days weekly. Initially created with a focus of helping AIDS patients, its service outreach had expanded by 2007 to include those diagnosed with breast cancer and terminal illnesses. It received a $200,000 unrestricted grant from Bank of America in 2013 which assisted the organization with creation of a new distribution center on the Eastern Shore of Maryland to help expand their delivery efforts to people throughout the region.

The Washington Post profiled the group early in its existence in 1990, noting it provided vital goods and services to sick people in the region who had difficulty leaving their residences. The Baltimore Afro-American reported on the organization and noted how crucial volunteering was to its success. The Baltimore Sun called it an important group providing sustenance to ill people in the area. Because of their efforts encouraging their employees to volunteer with Moveable Feast, the company SC&H earned the Mayor's Business Recognition Awards for outstanding community service from the mayor of Baltimore in 2014.

== History ==
During the epidemic of HIV/AIDS in the United States, Baltimore City Health Department official Robert Mehl persuaded the city's mayor at the time, Kurt Schmoke, to direct him to form a committee to address the ongoing crisis within their region. Mehl, original founder of the organization, was himself diagnosed with AIDS in 1985. Members of the founding committee included Robert Mehl, Joseph Lawrence Myers III, Skip Harting, David Glasser, Yvonne Veney, Esther Baker, and Shaun Carrick. Services to the community based on this initiative first began in 1989. After deliberations within the committee, the organization Moveable Feast was formed in 1990.

The organization was structured as a nonprofit organization with the aim of benefiting the local community through social services. It signed a US$3,000 contract in 1990 with the Baltimore City Health Department to bring food to AIDS patients. It operated in 1990 out of the Heritage United Church of Christ located in Northwest Baltimore. That year, the organization began providing services of two food portions biweekly to their 60 total clients, with a staff of three people. Its 1990 operating budget was $54,000, and they were provided both office space and telecommunications services via Baltimore's health department.

Individuals provided services by the organization began at ten and soon thereafter increased to over 150. Delivery of meals was assisted by fellow organizations Groceries to Go, Ryan White Medical Transportation, and People On the Move. In 2001, after seeing publicity about the organization on television, Karen Brewer was inspired to help Moveable Feast. She organized an initiative of volunteers at her home in Ellicott City, Maryland, to bake monthly desserts which she then delivered to Moveable Feast. Brewer brought together approximately 50 bakers from Howard County, Maryland, and the surrounding area to bake goods for her project.

In 2001, Moveable Feast provided food and services to about 550 people in Baltimore and 13 additional counties. The organization started an initiative in 2003 to teach individuals how to create meals so as to gain employment in the food services sector themselves. Culinary Arts and Life Skills Training Program training chef William J. Antonio told the Baltimore Afro-American that trainees in the program included prisoners on parole, homeless shelters, and halfway houses.

The culinary training program graduated 11 people in 2004. Transportation of meals directly to clients was broadened from HIV/AIDS to those afflicted with breast cancer and subsequently other ailments as well. In 2004, Moveable Feast provided food and services to more than 700 people five-days-per-week, and maintained a staff of 32 individuals in addition to volunteers.

Victor Basile served as executive director of the organization in 2007. Dietitians craft the quality of the meals for recipients. Executive director Basile described the clientele of the organization to The Baltimore Sun, stating: "These are pretty sick people. They're all poor. They're sick, so they don't have jobs. All of our services are free".

Its services in 2007 were focused on clientele suffering from additional diseases including those with a terminal illness. The organization took up residence in 2008 at 901 N. Milton Avenue in Baltimore. In 2009, the event Gay Expectations Too as part of the University of Baltimore live performance series Spotlight UB, helped raise US$2,400 for the organization. By 2010, the organization's region of service had expanded from merely Baltimore to include all of the Eastern Shore of Maryland. Barcoding Inc. General counsel Jeffery Zinn served on the board of the organization in 2011, and while simultaneously working in its kitchen. He told The Daily Record it was his favorite activity outside of work.

In 2013 the organization received a $200,000 unrestricted grant from Bank of America. This was given by its charitable foundation arm, through its awards initiative called Neighborhood Builders. Moveable Feast said it would use the funding to create a distribution center on the Eastern Shore of Maryland so as to better service their clients in that area with sustenance. Additionally the grant assisted the organization to obtain new kitchen capital purchases, and train staff with leadership skills.

== Commentary ==
In an early profile in 1990 by The Washington Post, the paper described the initiative as a "Baltimore organization that delivers bountiful portions of healthful meals to AIDS patients who are homebound". The Baltimore Afro-American noted the importance of volunteering to the organization, especially after cutbacks by the U.S. federal government in the amount of support they were previously given: "Volunteers at Moveable Feast work as kitchen assistants, delivery drivers, bakers and clerical assistants, and they are even more important now that federal funding cuts have eliminated 5 percent of the organization's annual budget." The Baltimore Sun described it as an important "group that feeds the sick" in the Baltimore area. In December 2014, Baltimore mayor Stephanie Rawlings-Blake recognized the company SC&H as a recipient of the Mayor's Business Recognition Awards for outstanding community service, because of their annual day of service arranging for their employees to volunteer at Moveable Feast and other organizations.

== Popular culture ==
Moveable Feast was featured in the 2013 season premier of the television show The Secret Millionaire in which Anne Beiler, the founder of Auntie Anne's pretzel company, masqueraded as a volunteer, then made a donation to the charity.

== See also ==
- Baltimore Community Foundation
- Pride Center of Maryland
- Save a Heart Foundation, Baltimore
