= Michelle Taylor (pediatrician) =

American pediatrician and public health official

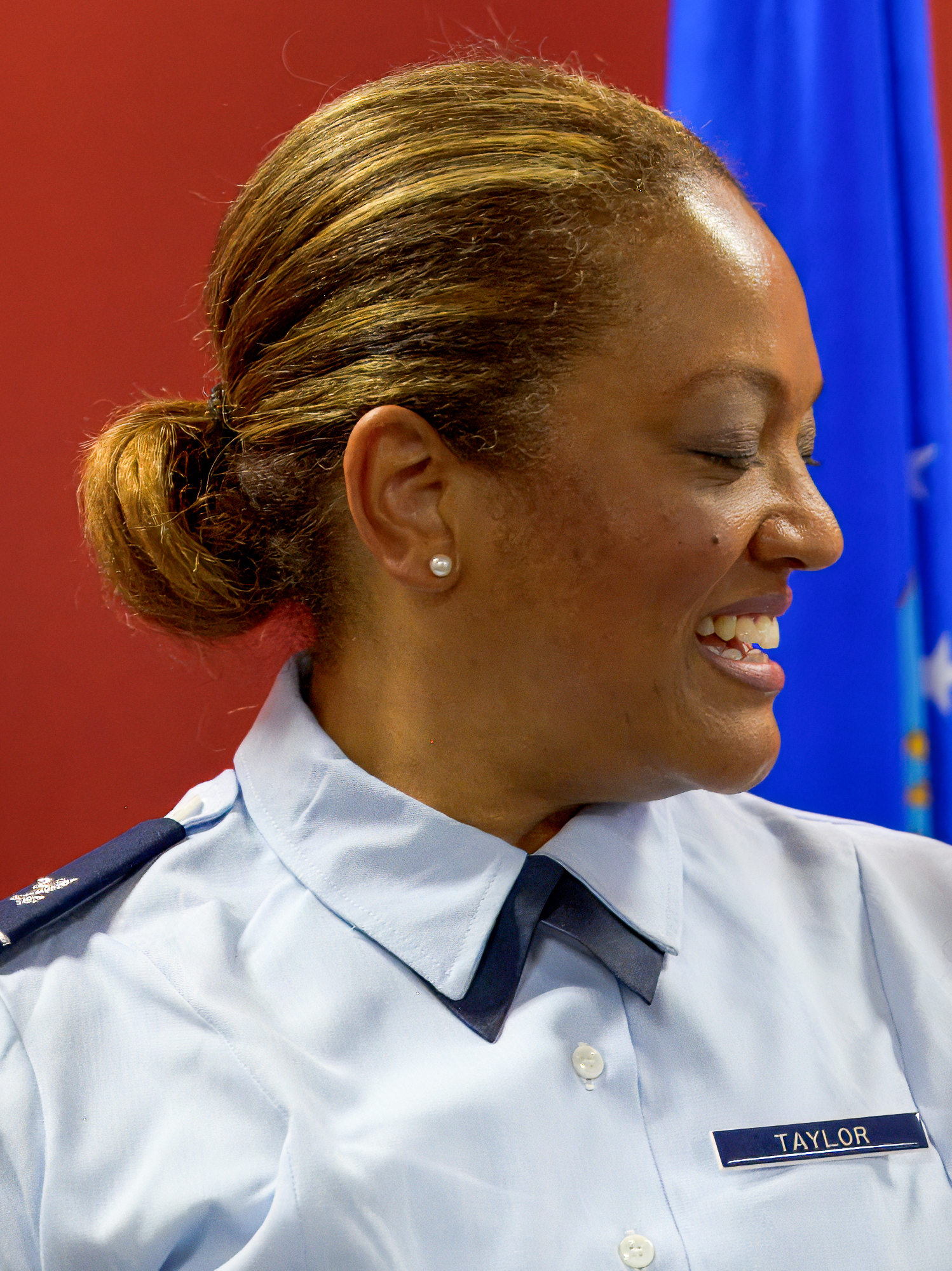
- Taylor in 2025

Commissioner of the Baltimore City Health Department
- Incumbent
- Assumed office August 4, 2025
- Preceded by: Simone Johnson (interim)

Personal details
- Born: North Dakota, U.S.
- Children: 2
- Education: Howard University; East Tennessee State University; University of Tennessee Health Science Center; Johns Hopkins University; Harvard University

Military service
- Branch/service: U.S. Air Force
- Rank: Colonel
- Unit: Tennessee Air National Guard

Michelle Taylor (born c. 1976) is an American pediatrician and public health official currently serving as the commissioner for the Baltimore City Health Department since 2025. Her career has focused on public health policy, maternal and child health, and addressing health inequities. She was director of the Shelby County, Tennessee Health Department from 2021 to 2025. Taylor is a colonel and flight surgeon in the Tennessee Air National Guard.

== Early life and education ==
Taylor was born c. 1976 in North Dakota. Her mother, Rita Works, became the first Black female officer in her Air National Guard squadron while her father worked as an IT executive and became the first Black executive at his firm. She grew up on several military bases, including in Alaska and California, before her family returned to their hometown of Memphis, Tennessee, when she was 11 years old. She graduated from White Station High School, where she was elected homecoming queen. Several family health crises during her youth, including a cousin's death from leukemia, an aunt's death from breast cancer at age 34, and her grandfather's struggles with substance addiction influenced her decision to pursue a career in medicine.

Taylor earned a bachelor's degree from Howard University in 1997. After graduating, she spent a year teaching science at Fairley High School in Memphis, her mother's alma mater. She completed a M.D. from East Tennessee State University's James H. Quillen College of Medicine in 2002 and completed her pediatric residency there and at the University of Tennessee Health Science Center from 2002 to 2005. She earned a M.S. in Epidemiology from the University of Tennessee Health Science Center, a D.P.H. from the Johns Hopkins Bloomberg School of Public Health in 2015 and a M.P.A. from the Harvard Kennedy School in 2018.

== Career ==
=== Early career and military service ===
After medical school, Taylor worked as a pediatrician in Memphis. She joined the Tennessee Air National Guard, where she is a Major and a residency-trained flight surgeon. In 2013, she began working at the Shelby County, Tennessee Health Department as an MCH/Emergency Preparedness Physician. From 2014 to 2016, she served as the department's associate medical director and deputy administrator for maternal and child health, where she led a successful initiative to reduce infant mortality.

In 2017, Taylor completed a minority health policy fellowship at Harvard University. Afterward, she moved to the Washington metropolitan area, where she was the deputy director for practice integration at the National Association of Community Health Centers. She also served as the division chief of the aerospace medicine division at the Office of the Air National Guard Surgeon General, based at Joint Base Andrews. She was promoted to colonel in January 2025.

=== Shelby County health director ===
Taylor returned to Memphis in 2021 after being appointed director of the Shelby County Health Department. Her appointment came at a difficult time for the agency, as the state of Tennessee had stripped it of its authority to distribute COVID-19 vaccines shortly before she took office. Her confirmation process was contentious, a county commissioner, Mark Billingsley, leaked an internal memo suggesting a search panel had not recommended her. Billingsley later publicly apologized to Taylor during the confirmation meeting, which was attended by a large group of her supporters. She was ultimately unanimously confirmed by the Shelby County Board of Commissioners in July 2021 and began her term on August 2 of that year.

During her tenure, which coincided with the COVID-19 pandemic in Tennessee, Taylor and her staff faced public harassment, including being verbally abused, spat on, and physically threatened. On one occasion, an anti-vaxxer came to her home, and she required a security detail twice. Her priorities as director included renovating public health clinics, improving data collection and sharing, establishing a behavioral health unit, and addressing health equity. She also focused on environmental justice, launching studies into cancer clusters in South Memphis neighborhoods exposed to industrial pollutants.

=== Baltimore health commissioner ===
On May 30, 2025, Baltimore Mayor Brandon Scott announced Taylor's appointment as the city's next health commissioner. She replaced interim commissioner Simone Johnson. Taylor began her new role on August 4, 2025. The Baltimore City Council unanimously confirmed her appointment on September 15, 2025, and she was officially sworn in later that month. In her role, Taylor is tasked with shaping the city's health policies, addressing health disparities, and leading the response to the opioid epidemic. She has pledged to create a behavioral health division and set a goal to reduce opioid overdose deaths by 40% by 2040. She also plans to bring "community care fairs" to Baltimore, a model she used in Memphis to provide a wide range of health services directly to neighborhoods with high rates of HIV and other health challenges.

== Personal life ==
Taylor was previously married to a radiologist. She has a son and daughter. She is a breast cancer survivor, having been diagnosed in 2016 and undergoing a double mastectomy. Her mother is also a breast cancer survivor. Taylor has stated that her personal experience with cancer crystallized her commitment to addressing health inequities and improving patient advocacy. She is a member of the Delta Sigma Theta sorority.

== See also ==
- List of African-American women in medicine
