= Leana Wen =

Physician, author and public health advocate

- 温麟衍

President of Planned Parenthood
- In office November 12, 2018 – July 16, 2019
- Preceded by: Cecile Richards
- Succeeded by: Alexis McGill Johnson

Commissioner of the Baltimore City Health Department
- In office December 5, 2014 – October 12, 2018
- Preceded by: Oxiris Barbot
- Succeeded by: Mary Beth Haller (interim)

Personal details
- Born: Wen Linyan; January 27, 1983 (age 43) Shanghai, China
- Spouse: Sebastian Walker (m. 2012)
- Children: 2
- Education: California State University, Los Angeles (BS); Washington University in St. Louis (MD); Merton College, Oxford (MSc, MSc)

Chinese name
- Traditional Chinese: 溫麟衍
- Simplified Chinese: 温麟衍
Transcriptions
Standard Mandarin
- Hanyu Pinyin: Wēn Línyǎn

Leana Sheryle Wen (Chinese: 温麟衍; pinyin: Wēn Línyǎn; born Wen Linyan; January 27, 1983) is an American physician, author, professor, speaker, consultant, columnist, and television commentator. She is former health commissioner for the city of Baltimore and former president of Planned Parenthood.

Wen has served as a public health communicator during the COVID-19 pandemic and 2022 mpox outbreak, appearing frequently on CNN as a medical analyst. She was asked to testify four times to Congress during the COVID-19 pandemic, including twice to the Select Subcommittee on the Coronavirus Crisis. She has garnered criticism by some public health advocates for her views on the pandemic.

Wen serves as a public health professor at George Washington University and is a nonresident senior fellow at the Brookings Institution. She is a columnist for The Washington Post and a medical analyst for CNN.

== Early life and family ==
Born Wen Linyan (温麟衍) in Shanghai, China on January 27, 1983, to Ying Sandy Zhang and Xiaolu Wen. Wen moved with her parents to the U.S. when she was eight, by then having the English name Leana Sheryle Wen. Granted political asylum, the Wen family lived in East Los Angeles and Compton, California. In 2003, Wen and her family became U.S. citizens.

Wen's mother, who died of breast cancer in 2010, first worked as a hotel room cleaner and video store clerk before becoming an elementary school teacher. Her father delivered newspapers and was a dishwasher, later serving as technology manager for The Chinese Daily News in Los Angeles.

Wen married South Africa native Sebastian Neil Walker in Boston in February 2012, after a blessing ceremony in Cape Town in November 2011. They have two children: a son born in 2017 and a daughter born in 2020.

== Education ==
As a result of her own asthma attacks as a child and seeing a neighbor's child die of an asthma attack, Wen decided that she wanted to become an emergency room physician.

At age 13, Wen began attending California State University, Los Angeles, via its the Early Entrance Program (EEP), and graduated summa cum laude at age 18 with a Bachelor of Science in biochemistry in 2001. She then received a Doctor of Medicine from Washington University School of Medicine in 2007 and received a Rhodes Scholarship to study in England at Merton College, Oxford, where she earned two master's degrees: a Master of Science (MSc) in economic and social history in 2007 and another in Chinese studies in 2008. She also met her future husband, Sebastian Walker, during her time in England.

In 2005, Wen took a one-year leave of absence from medical school to serve as the national president of the American Medical Student Association, where she led campaigns to increase healthcare access, decrease health disparities, and combat conflicts of interest between physicians and the pharmaceutical companies who notoriously use attractive sales representatives and free gifts to influence doctors, especially young interns and medical residents. Wen became involved in U.S. and international health policy during medical school, serving in Geneva, Switzerland, as a fellow for the World Health Organization and in Rwanda as a fellow for the U.S. Department of Defense. In addition, she advised the U.S. Congress on physician workforce and medical education through her appointment on the Council on Graduate Medical Education by the U.S. Secretary of Health and Human Services.

== Career ==
=== Emergency medicine ===
Following medical school, Wen completed a residency at Brigham and Women's Hospital (BWH) and Massachusetts General Hospital (Mass General) and a clinical fellowship at Harvard Medical School in Boston. She is board certified in emergency medicine. Wen started working in emergency medicine at BWH and Mass General before moving to the ER at the George Washington University (GW) in Washington, DC, where she became a professor in emergency medicine and health policy, and the Director of Patient-Centered Care Research. She served as a consultant to the Brookings Institution and the China Medical Board, and conducted international health systems research including in South Africa, Slovenia, Nigeria, Singapore, and China.

=== Baltimore City health commissioner ===
From December 2014 until October 2018, Wen served as the health commissioner for Baltimore City under two mayors. She was first appointed by Mayor Stephanie Rawlings-Blake; in December 2016, she was reappointed by Mayor Catherine Pugh. She resigned in 2018, when she was appointed head of the Planned Parenthood Federation of America.

In her role as commissioner, Wen oversaw the Baltimore City Health Department, an agency of 1,100 employees and $130 million annual budget with wide-ranging responsibilities, including management of acute communicable diseases, animal control, chronic disease prevention, emergency preparedness, food service inspections, HIV/AIDS and other sexually transmitted diseases, maternal-child health, school health, senior services, and youth violence issues.

She directed the city's public health recovery efforts after the 2015 Baltimore riots, including ensuring prescription medication access to seniors after the closure of 13 pharmacies, and developing the Mental Health/Trauma Recovery Plan, with 24-hour crisis counseling, and healing circles and group counseling in schools, community groups, and churches.

Following the riots, the Baltimore City Health Department team launched numerous campaigns, including a citywide trauma response plan, youth health and wellness strategy, violence prevention programs, B'Healthy in B'More blog, and B'More Health Talks, a biweekly town hall and podcast series on health disparities.

In March 2018, on behalf of Wen and the Baltimore City Health Department, the City of Baltimore sued the Trump administration for cutting teen pregnancy prevention funds, which resulted in a federal judge ordering the Trump administration to restore $5 million in grant funding to two Baltimore-based teen pregnancy prevention programs. She wrote an opinion editorial criticizing proposed changes to the Title X program which would affect health clinics in Baltimore providing reproductive health care for low income women. This court decision was later reversed by the 9th Circuit court, enabling the Trump administration to withhold Title X funding for abortion.

==== Opioid overdose epidemic response ====
Wen has led implementation of the Baltimore opioid overdose prevention and response plan, which includes a blanket prescription for the opioid antidote, naloxone; "hotspotting" and street outreach teams to target individuals most at risk; training family/friends on naloxone use; and launching a new public education campaign. Wen testified to the U.S. Senate HELP Committee and U.S. House Oversight Committee on Baltimore's overdose prevention efforts. She led a group of state and city health officials to petition the Food and Drug Administration (FDA) on adding black box warnings to opioids and benzodiazepines. In March 2016, she was invited by the White House to join President Barack Obama and CNN's Dr. Sanjay Gupta on a panel discussion, where she spoke about Baltimore's response. She convened doctors and public health leaders to sign the Baltimore Statement on the Importance of Childhood Vaccinations and to successfully advocate to ban the sale of powdered alcohol in Maryland and synthetic drugs in Baltimore.

Congressman Elijah Cummings cited Wen's efforts to combat the opioid epidemic in Baltimore and sought her help in creating national legislation to change how the United States fights it.

In 2018, the National Association of County and City Health Officials awarded the Baltimore City Health Department the Local Health Department of the Year.

=== Planned Parenthood ===
On September 18, 2018, Wen was appointed president of Planned Parenthood Federation of America. She was the first medical doctor to serve in the role in nearly 50 years and was the first woman doctor ever to do so. In an interview with Elle magazine, Wen described her excitement to be at the helm of the organization where both she and her mother had received significant medical care many years prior.

Wen envisioned a new direction for discourse surrounding Planned Parenthood, endeavoring to frame abortion access as an issue of healthcare rather than politics. She also wanted to expand the services provided by Planned Parenthood clinics to include treatment for medical concerns unrelated to reproduction, especially treatment for opioid addiction and easy access to Naloxone (in keeping with her former work as Health Commissioner in Baltimore). In an op-ed for the New York Times after her departure from the organization, she described her initial goal as "finding common ground with the large majority of Americans who can unite behind the goal of improving the health and well-being of women and children." Wen's appointment and proposed strategic plan received mixed reviews, with commentators on both sides of the political spectrum both praising her novel approach and criticizing it as "backing away from the fight [for abortion access]."

Wen's tenure at Planned Parenthood saw many major events with implications for reproductive healthcare, starting with the confirmation hearings and appointment to the Supreme Court of Brett Kavanaugh, and ending with the implementation of the nationwide Title X gag rule under the Trump-Pence administration. This legislation prevented medical providers who received funding from Title X from referring patients for abortion services and also prohibited the performance of abortions in the same facility as providers who received Title X funding (the rule was later overturned in 2021 by the Biden-Harris administration). The period also saw a marked increase in the number of laws passed at the state level that restricted access to abortions.

As president of Planned Parenthood, Wen worked to expand non-abortion services like maternal health and mental health services and to rebrand Planned Parenthood from its image as an abortion rights advocacy group to a comprehensive women's health organization that serves women and families. She spoke out about her own experiences as a cervical cancer survivor who struggled with infertility, and about a miscarriage she suffered while in the role.

In July 2019, Wen was forced to resign from her position after only 8 months. The board gave no reason, but sources cited a dispute over management and organizational philosophy. Other sources alluded to Wen's incompatibilities with the organization on an interpersonal level, citing organization members' difficulty adapting to her leadership style. In a letter to Planned Parenthood affiliates, Wen claimed philosophical differences in the direction of the organization.

On July 19, 2019, Wen published an opinion editorial in The New York Times which set forth the circumstances underlying her departure from Planned Parenthood. She attributed her sudden departure more specifically to disagreements over the centrality of abortion in the mission of Planned Parenthood and stated her view that "As one of the few national health care organizations with a presence in all 50 states, Planned Parenthood's mandate should be to promote reproductive health care as part of a wide range of policies that affect women's health and public health." Echoing her earlier statements, she described her goal to focus on the more holistic elements of the organization, while the board instead wanted to focus on the political debate surrounding abortion rights.

=== Teaching and research ===
In August 2019, it was announced that Wen would join the Milken Institute School of Public Health (Milken Institute SPH) at the George Washington University (GW) as a visiting professor of health policy and management. She was also named a distinguished fellow in the Fitzhugh Mullan Institute for Health Workforce Equity (Mullan Institute), where she focused on advancing "interdisciplinary research and education, participating in the trainings of the Mullan Institute’s fellowship programs and enhancing the school’s educational opportunities in the areas of maternal and child health, women’s health and health equity.". She is also a nonresident senior fellow at the Brookings Institution.

=== Journalism ===
==== The Washington Post ====
Wen started writing for The Washington Post as a contributing op-ed writer in 2019. Her role as a columnist became formalized in 2020, and she began anchoring a weekly newsletter on public health and healthcare called The Checkup with Dr. Wen. Her commentaries for the Post started with a heavy focus on COVID-19 and have touched on a range of other issues, including the nursing shortage, the opioid epidemic, reemergence of polio, cancer, mental health, obesity, marijuana, and other public health and policy topics. In 2023, Wen received attention for a piece claiming that Covid deaths were being over counted, with some claiming vindication after claims of over counting deaths were decried as conspiracy theories years earlier.

==== CNN ====
Wen has appeared frequently on CNN during the COVID-19 pandemic and 2022 monkeypox outbreak as an on-air medical analyst.

=== Patient advocacy ===
In 2013, St. Martin's Press published her book, When Doctors Don't Listen: How to Avoid Misdiagnoses and Unnecessary Tests with coauthor Joshua Kosowsky. It is about how patients can take control of their health to advocate for better care for themselves.

Wen wrote a blog, The Doctor is Listening. She was a regular contributor to the Huffington Post and Psychology Today on patient empowerment and healthcare reform. She was also an advisor to the then-newly established Patient-Centered Outcomes Research Institute, and an advisor to the Lown Institute and the Medical Education Futures Study. She was the founder of Who's My Doctor, an international campaign that called for transparency in medicine.

Wen is a frequent keynote speaker on healthcare reform, education, and leadership, and has given several TED Talks. Her TED talk on transparency in medicine has been viewed over 1.9 million times.

=== COVID-19 ===
Wen's evolving views on the COVID-19 pandemic have garnered support and controversy from both sides of the political spectrum.

A Texas man pleaded guilty to threatening her due to her advocacy for COVID-19 vaccines and was sentenced in federal court to six months in prison.

In 2022, Wen was scheduled to speak at American Public Health Association (APHA)'s annual meeting. However, an online petition was circulated that asked her to be removed as a speaker. The petition claimed that Wen "has promoted unscientific, unsafe, ableist, fatphobic, and unethical practices during the COVID-19 pandemic", citing her comment regarding treating COVID as endemic for example. The petition caused a heated response from all perspectives, and eventually resulted in Wen decided not to attend APHA out of safety concerns.

=== Water fluoridation ===
Wen published an opinion piece in The Washington Post on November 12, 2024, suggesting that Robert F. Kennedy Jr.'s stance against water fluoridation does not warrant the backlash it has garnered. Wen wrote that higher than normal levels fluoride may show some correlation with negative impacts on mental development while also stating that low levels of fluoride have been proven to be safe.

=== Bird flu ===
On December 29, 2024, during a CBS Face The Nation broadcast, Dr. Wen commented on the bird flu testing issue, saying that the absence of widespread testing does not indicate that the virus is not present in humans. She argued that the federal government should have learned from the experience with the COVID-19 pandemic and be proactive in ensuring that testing is readily available to the public. Wen emphasized that there should not be a delay in making tests accessible while waiting for laboratories to analyze the cases and assess their severity. She said, "We have outbreaks in poultry in all 50 states; 16 states have outbreaks in cattle. In California, in the last 30 days, there have been more than 300 herds that tested positive, and now we have 66 cases of bird flu in humans, and this is almost certainly a significant undercount, because we have not been doing nearly enough testing".

Dr. Wen also urged the Biden administration to approve the H5N1 vaccine. This vaccine has already been developed, and manufacturers have been contracted to produce nearly 5 million doses, although it still awaits FDA authorization. This situation marks a significant difference compared to the initial stages of the COVID-19 response.

=== Second Trump administration ===
On March 11, 2025, Wen wrote an op-ed in The Washington Post showing support for Trump's NIH and FDA nominees, Jay Bhattacharya and Marty Makary respectively.

== Awards and recognition ==
- 2013: served as the national president of the American Medical Student Association and the American Academy of Emergency Medicine/Resident and Student Association.
- 2016: commencement speaker for the University of Maryland School of Medicine and the Notre Dame of Maryland University, where she was awarded an honorary Doctorate of Humane Letters.; commencement speaker at Washington University School of Medicine and at the Johns Hopkins Bloomberg School of Public Health.
- 2017: honored as a Public Official of the Year by Governing, a source of information for elected, appointed and other public leaders
- 2017–18: named one of Modern Healthcare's 50 Most Influential Physician Executives and Leaders and one of its Top 25 Minority Physician Executives.
- 2019: named one of TIME's 100 Most Influential People and referred to by Cynthia Nixon in the magazine as a "fierce visionary" for reproductive rights and health care.
- 2019 The Carnegie Corporation of New York honored Wen with Great Immigrant Award.
- 2021: named one of Modern Healthcare's 100 Most Influential People in Healthcare.
- 2022: inducted as a member of the Council on Foreign Relations; received the YWCA Excellence in Public Health Award.; awarded the Walter C. Alvarez award for excellence in communicating healthcare developments and concepts to the public by the American Medical Writers Association.

== Books and selected publications ==
- Wen, Leana; Kosowsky, Joshua (2013). When Doctors Don't Listen: How to Avoid Misdiagnoses and Unnecessary Tests. Thomas Dunne Books. ISBN 978-0-312-59491-6.
- Wen, Leana (2021). Lifelines: A Doctor's Journey in the Fight for Public Health. Metropolitan Books. ISBN 978-1-250-18623-2.
- Wen, Leana; Atkinson, John P; Giclas, Patricia C (April 2004). "Clinical and laboratory evaluation of complement deficiency". Journal of Allergy and Clinical Immunology. 113 (4): 585–593. doi:10.1016/j.jaci.2004.02.003. PMID 15100659.
- Reiter, Mark; Wen, Leana S.; Allen, Brady W. (April 2016). "The Emergency Medicine Workforce: Profile and Projections". The Journal of Emergency Medicine. 50 (4): 690–693. doi:10.1016/j.jemermed.2015.09.022. PMID 26823136.
- Wen, Leana S.; Geduld, Heike I.; Tobias Nagurney, J.; Wallis, Lee A. (August 2011). "Africa's First Emergency Medicine Training Program at the University of Cape Town/Stellenbosch University: History, Progress, and Lessons Learned". Academic Emergency Medicine. 18 (8): 868–871. doi:10.1111/j.1553-2712.2011.01131.x. PMID 21843223.
- Wen, Leana S.; Baca, Justin T.; O'Malley, Patricia; Bhatia, Kriti; Peak, David; Takayesu, J. Kimo (May 2013). "Implementation of small-group reflection rounds at an emergency medicine residency program". Canadian Journal of Emergency Medicine. 15 (3): 175–178. doi:10.2310/8000.2013.130935. PMID 23663465. S2CID 15074501.
- Wen, Leana S.; Oshiomogho, John I.; Eluwa, George I.; Steptoe, Anne P.; Sullivan, Ashley F.; Camargo, Carlos A. (October 1, 2012). "Characteristics and capabilities of emergency departments in Abuja, Nigeria". Emergency Medicine Journal. 29 (10): 798–801. doi:10.1136/emermed-2011-200695. PMID 22052953. S2CID 23350805.
- Wen, Leana S.; Sadeghi, Nakisa B. (October 24, 2020). "The opioid crisis and the 2020 US election: crossroads for a national epidemic". The Lancet. 396 (10259): 1316–1318. doi:10.1016/S0140-6736(20)32113-9. PMC 7538141. PMID 33035495.
- Wen, Leana; Espinola, Janice; Mosowsky, Joshua; Camargo, Carlos (January 1, 2015). "Do Emergency Department Patients Receive a Pathological Diagnosis? A Nationally-Representative Sample". Western Journal of Emergency Medicine. 16 (1): 50–54. doi:10.5811/westjem.2014.12.23474. PMC 4307726. PMID 25671008.
