= Gay Life =

Newspaper in Baltimore, Maryland

- Type: Weekly newspaper
- Owner: Pride Center of Maryland
- Founded: September 1979
- Ceased publication: 2016
- Language: English
- OCLC number: 47694046
- Website: www.baltimoregaylife.com

Gay Life was a weekly newspaper about gay culture published by the LGBT Community Center of Baltimore and Central Maryland. It was distributed in Baltimore, Maryland and throughout the Mid-Atlantic region.

== History ==
In September 1979, the GCCB began to put out a monthly newsletter that evolved into the Baltimore Gay Paper (BGP). The Gay Paper eventually became Gay Life. The lesbian activist Gail Vivino volunteered to use the basement of her Charles Village apartment at 2745 N. Calvert Street to host the production space for the newspaper, as well as the switchboard for the GLCCB. The production space later moved into a building at 241 West Chase Street.

The editor and co-founder of the newspaper was Louise Kelley, a lesbian and feminist activist who wrote for Women's Express, served as a board member for the Chase Brexton clinic, worked on the Schmoke administration's Task Force on Gay and Lesbian Issues, and coordinate women's activities for the GLCCB.

In 2016, Gay Life was purchased from the GLCCB and merged into the LGBT newspaper Baltimore OUTloud.

Baltimore's Enoch Pratt Free Library maintains a partial archive of the newspaper on microfilm in its Periodicals Department Collection. The newspaper is also available on microfilm at Cornell University, Michigan State University, and the University of Chicago.
