= Ihuoma Emenuga =

Nigerian-American internist and public health physician

Commissioner of the Baltimore City Health Department
- In office January 22, 2024 – July 29, 2024
- Appointed by: Brandon Scott
- Preceded by: Mary Beth Haller (interim)
- Succeeded by: Simone Johnson (interim)

Personal details
- Education: University of Ibadan; University of Nigeria; University of London; University of Maryland, College Park

Ihuoma Emenuga is a Nigerian-American internist and public health physician who served as the commissioner of the Baltimore City Health Department from January to July 2024.

== Life ==
Emenuga earned a B.Sc. in biochemistry from the University of Ibadan. She received a M.D. from the University of Nigeria. She completed a M.Sc. in public health at the London School of Hygiene and Tropical Medicine. Emenuga earned a M.B.A. from the Robert H. Smith School of Business at the University of Maryland, College Park. Emenuga completed a residency fellowship in health policy at George Washington University and an internal medicine residency at Howard University Hospital. She was chief resident and worked as the associate program director of its internal medicine residency training program.

Emenuga specializes in public health, preventative care, and wellness medicine. She speaks English, French, and Igbo. In April 2014, Emenuga was issued a medical license by the Maryland Board of Physicians. She was a medical director in the youth wellness and community health division in the Baltimore City Health Department. In that role, she oversaw clinical services provided in Baltimore City Public Schools. On January 22, 2024, Emenuga was selected by Baltimore mayor Brandon Scott to succeed interim commissioner Mary Beth Haller as the city's health commissioner. She was terminated on July 29, 2024, and succeeded by interim commissioner Simone Johnson.
