= LGBT Baltimore =

Book

- First edition
- Editor: Richard Oloiza
- Author: Louise Parker Kelley
- Language: English
- Subject: LGBT history of Baltimore
- Publisher: Arcadia Publishing
- Publication date: 2015
- Publication place: United States
- ISBN: 9781439652855
- OCLC: 949365239

LGBT Baltimore is a 2015 book about the culture and history of the LGBT community of Baltimore, Maryland, from the 1960s to the 2010s, written by lesbian and feminist activist Louise Parker Kelley. The book is part of Arcadia Publishing's series of pictorial histories.

== Reception ==
The University of Baltimore hosted a celebration of LGBT Baltimore and issued a statement saying:

“‘LGBT Baltimore’ is the result of an emerging archival effort to preserve and catalog the history of gay culture in the city…For the nearby Mt. Vernon neighborhood, a Baltimore cultural landmark with deep roots in the city’s lesbian, gay, bisexual and transgender culture, the preservation of these materials signifies an important contribution to sustaining the heritage of the community.”

Research for the book relied on archival information collected by the University of Baltimore's Langsdale Library. Recollections, documents, and photographs were collected from Mount Vernon, Baltimore's gayborhood, and surrounding areas.

== Presentation ==
The book was launched at an event hosted by the Langsdale Library that was attended by former Mayor of Baltimore and University of Baltimore President Kurt Schmoke.

Kelley gave a book presentation for LGBT Baltimore in October 2018 at Red Emma's in Baltimore.

== See also ==
- LGBT
