= Joan Erbe =

American artist (1926-2014)

Joan Erbe Udel
- Joan Erbe, shown in 2011 (Lloyd Fox, Baltimore Sun)
- Born: Joan Erbe; 1926; Baltimore, Maryland
- Died: August 21, 2014 (aged 87–88); Towson, Maryland
- Known for: Painting
- Spouse: George Udel

Joan Erbe Udel (1926 – August 21, 2014) was a Baltimore painter and sculptor. She was best known for using bright colors and was called "The Grand Duchess of Baltimore Painters" by Ned Oldham as quoted by Rebecca Hoffberger in Baltimore Magazine. She received her training at the Maryland Institute College of Art, where she was a student of Leonard Bahr and Louis Bouché.

== Early life ==
Joan Erbe was born in Baltimore in 1926. She was the daughter of Harry Erbe, a wholesale coffee salesman and Bertha Metcalf Erbe, who was a secretary at the Enoch Pratt Free Library's children's department.

== Career ==
Erbe received two scholarships to Maryland Institute in her early 20s. She had her first solo exhibit at the Baltimore Museum of Art in 1966. Additional solo exhibitions are list below.

== Personal life and death ==
Erbe married at 18 years of age and had two daughters, Joan and Constance. She had another child, Jacob, with her second husband George Udel, whom she married in 1954.

Erbe died on August 21, 2014, at the age of 87.

== Exhibitions ==
Erbe's work has been the subject of more than sixty solo exhibitions including at:

- The Baltimore Museum of Art
- The Butler Institute of American Art
- Goucher College
- Johns Hopkins University
- The Smithsonian Institution (Washington, D.C.)
- Philadelphia Art Alliance
- Salpeter Gallery (New York City)
- St. John's College (Annapolis, MD)
- The Art Gallery at the University of Maryland
- I.F. A. Gallery (Washington, DC)
