= Baltimore City Health Department =

Baltimore City department

Agency overview
- Formed: September 12, 1793
- Jurisdiction: Baltimore City
- Headquarters: 1001 East Fayette Street Baltimore, Maryland 21202
- Employees: 1,100 (2015)
- Annual budget: $130 million (2015)
- Agency executive: Michelle Taylor, Health Commissioner
- Website: health.baltimorecity.gov

The Baltimore City Health Department (BCHD) is the public health agency of the city of Baltimore, Maryland. BCHD convenes and collaborates with other city agencies, health care providers, community organizations and funders to "empower Baltimoreans with the knowledge, access, and environment that will enable healthy living."

The Baltimore City Health Department is organized into four divisions: Administration, Youth Wellness and Community Health, Population Health and Disease Prevention, and Aging and CARE (Commission on Aging and Retirement Education) Services. The Health Department has a wide-ranging area of responsibility, including acute communicable diseases, animal control, chronic disease prevention, emergency preparedness, HIV/STD, maternal and child health, restaurant inspections, school health, substance use, environmental health, health clinics, senior services, and youth violence issues.

The agency employs a workforce of approximately 1,100 employees and manages a budget of approximately $126 million. Dr. Letitia Dzirasa was named Baltimore City Health Commissioner in 2019.

== History ==
Public health has always been a major issue in the city of Baltimore., with respect both to the business interests and the residents.

The Baltimore City Health Department was founded in 1793 and is the oldest continuously operating health department in the United States. It was established in response to the first recorded yellow fever outbreak in Baltimore at Fell's Point. On September 12, 1793, Governor Thomas Lee issued a proclamation appointing Baltimore's first health officers, Drs. John Worthington and John Ross .

Prior to 1793, Baltimore lacked a public health system but faced various health problems. For the majority of the 18th century, public health activity was centered on the reporting of “nuisances” and the government of Baltimore was managed by the town and special commissioners. In 1745, the town issued a prohibition against geese and swine running at large and in 1750, it enforced the removal of “stinking fish and dead creates or carrion” left out on streets. At the meetings of the Continental Congress in 1776 and 1777, delegates of the Continental Congress complained about the uncleanliness of Baltimore. Oliver Wolcott of Connecticut called Baltimore “the most dirty place I was ever in.” In November 1785, citizens of Baltimore petitioned Governor William Paca to establish a health office that could manage prevalent diseases and other health concerns. Their efforts were unsuccessful and the urgent need for a health department became apparent only after citywide outbreaks of yellow fever and smallpox later in the century.

The first health officers were called “quarantine physicians” and were tasked with the prevention of the spread of yellow fever further into Baltimore. During the same year, many French fleeing the Haitian Revolution were seeking refuge in Baltimore. Dr. John Ross was delegated the role of maritime quarantine and was responsible for stopping yellow fever from reaching beyond the port. Dr. John Worthington managed land quarantine and patrolled traffic on the roads between Baltimore and Philadelphia, a port city that was experiencing a massive yellow fever outbreak.

In 1794, a Committee of Health was established along with a quarantine hospital at Hawkins Point. On January 1, 1797, Baltimore officially became incorporated as a city and the public health department was placed in the control of nine health commissioners. The Board of Health (which in 1900 was named the “Department of Health”) was established as a branch of the city government and the Committee of Health came to be known as the “Commissioners of Health.”

The administration of the Health Department was founded on Ordinance No. 11 (April 7, 1797) and Ordinance No. 15 (April 11, 1797), which served as bases for all subsequent sanitary legislation. By the end of this year, the primary responsibilities of the health department were to keep contagious diseases out and to maintain cleanliness of the city and inspect meat and fish brought into Baltimore. Quarantines against yellow fever continued for many years and debate ensued over whether yellow fever was actually contagious. In 1797, Dr. John Davidge of Baltimore published for the first time a report claiming that it was not contagious, and his theory was reaffirmed by Dr. David Reese after the 1819 yellow fever epidemic. Quarantines against yellow fever were eventually dropped in the nineteenth century.

Records show that Baltimore City experienced major yellow fever outbreaks in 1794, 1797, 1798, 1799, 1800, 1808, and 1819. After the 1819 yellow fever epidemic, the Health Department issued the Ordinance of 1821, which required that the Board of Health fence in affected areas, guard the fenced district with sentinels, and display a yellow flag on homes of infected people in future cases of yellow fever outbreak.

Baltimore also faced numerous outbreaks of smallpox in the 18th and 19th centuries. Vaccination became mandatory in smallpox districts during the 1827 epidemic and physicians were required to report cases of smallpox in 1834.

In the 1800s, the internal organization of the Health Department underwent major changes. The number of health commissioners was reduced to five in 1801, four in 1803, and two in 1808; the title of quarantine physician was abolished during the same year. In 1820, a consulting physician was appointed as an advisor to the mayor about city health issues. By 1900, the Board of Health was abolished and there was only one commissioner of health who held sole responsibility for the health department.

The 20th century saw the expansion of the Health Department's internal organization and the establishment of public health administration as a branch of medical practice in Baltimore. Previously, public health had been administered through volunteer service of private physicians. In the early part of the century, the BCHD took aggressive measures against cases of communicable diseases including pulmonary tuberculosis and typhoid. In 1909, the Sydenham Hospital, located on the grounds of the Bay View Asylum, was inaugurated for patients with scarlet fever and diphtheria. The installation of water chlorination in 1911, a sewer system in 1915, and water filtration in 1915 through the Bureau of Sanitation eradicated typhoid from Baltimore City.

In 1908 and 1917, the BCHD published two milk ordinances that required the pasteurization of milk. In 1919, the Baltimore Bureau of Child Welfare was established, followed by the Bureau of Maternity Hygiene fifteen years later. The Bureau of Child Welfare developed educational programs for expectant mothers, foundling and orphan asylums, and advances in infant hygiene that led to reductions in infant mortality.

From 1853 to the 1930s, Health Department activities were largely conducted by a group of “health wardens”, qualified physicians assigned to one of the 24 political wards in the city. Throughout the 20th century, the Health Department collaborated heavily with the medical community to develop solutions to diseases and basic health needs of its citizens.

The beginning of the 20th century also saw the establishment of a Bureau of Health Education. The BCHD distributed public health literature, organized exhibits, started the Baltimore Health News in 1918, and inaugurated a radio program called Keeping Well in 1932.

During this century, Baltimore came to be divided into health districts, each with a staff of health officers and public health nurses. The Eastern Health District was established in 1932 and the boundaries of other districts, including the Druid and Northern districts, continued to evolve in subsequent decades.

During the epidemic of HIV/AIDS in the United States, Baltimore City Health Department official Robert Mehl persuaded the city's mayor to form a committee to address food problems; the Baltimore-based charity Moveable Feast grew out of this initiative in 1990. By 2010, the organization's region of service had expanded from merely Baltimore to include all of the Eastern Shore of Maryland.

== Role in 2015 Baltimore protests ==
In April 2015, protests occurred in Baltimore, following the death of Freddie Gray. The civil unrest resulted in the mobilization of thousands of police and Maryland National Guard troops and the declaration of a state of emergency in Baltimore.

During the protests, the Baltimore City Health Department (BCHD) coordinated a response with hospitals, health care facilities, and community members. During the riots, BCHD provided updates for hospital emergency planners and led to the establishment of a citywide security plan for hospitals and healthcare facilities. Immediately following the violence, the Health Department mobilized an emergency shuttle, food pantry, and medical supply pantry at the Sandtown-Winchester Senior Center in the community where Freddie Gray lived. Staff members led twice-daily shuttle trips from West Baltimore to Walmart and Giant for residents whose local grocery stores and pharmacies were affected by looting.

After 13 pharmacies in the city closed due to looting and fire damage, BCHD partnered with the 3-1-1 hotline to provide residents with access to life-saving medications. Health Department staff provided prescription deliveries, transportation assistance, prescription transfers, door-to-door outreach, and disseminated information about open pharmacies in nearby areas. BCHD also developed the Baltimore Healthcare Access List and Pharmacies Operations List, which provided up-to-date information about closures and hours of health care providers and pharmacies.

During the unrest, BCHD announced its commitment to address the mental health needs of Baltimore's residents. The implementation of the Baltimore Mental Health/Trauma Recovery Plan led to the creation of a 24/7 crisis response line, free group counseling, and healing circles led by licensed mental health professionals.

Today, the Health Department continues to work to provide trauma-informed care training to front-line city employees in order to improve the relationship between at-risk citizens and prevent traumatizing and re-traumatizing. Mayor Stephanie Rawlings-Blake and Health Commissioner Leana Wen have stated their commitment to training every front-line city worker to becoming fully trauma-informed. BCHD has also brought on board a team of Baltimore Corps Fellows whose priority is to engage the community, particularly the youth, to better address their health concerns. Additionally, BCHD hosts weekly B’More Health Talks, virtual town hall meetings led by Commissioner Dr. Leana Wen that unite community leaders in discussions about relevant public health issues. In late 2015, BCHD launched an ambitious overdose prevention program that involves standing orders for every resident in the city. This program was featured by President Barack Obama in a panel discussion with Commissioner Wen.

== Programs ==
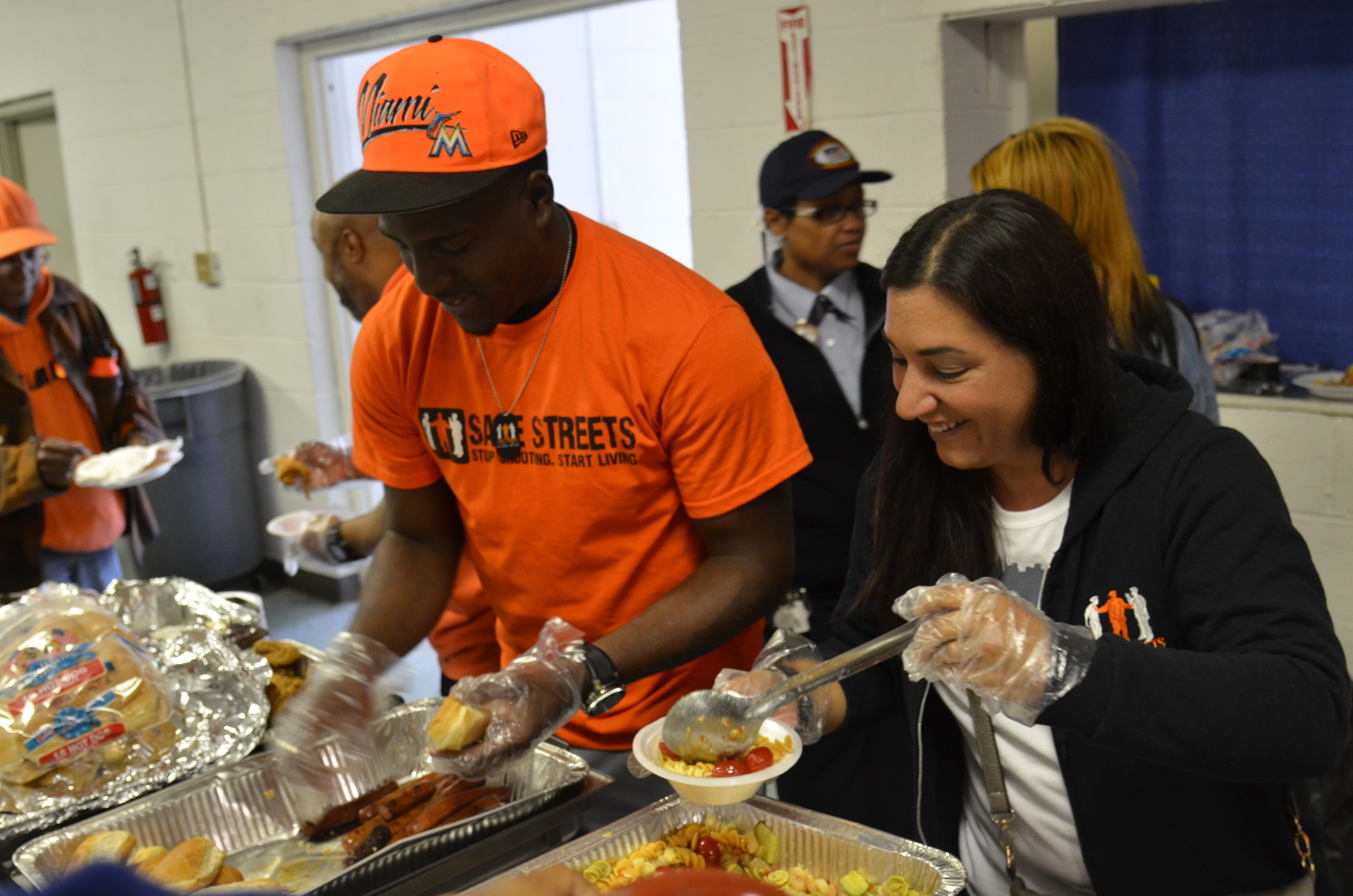
Celebration of More Than One Year with Zero Homicides in Safe Streets Cherry Hill post

The Baltimore City Health Department administers many programs under each of its nine divisions and bureaus. Some programs are:

- B’More for Healthy Babies (BHB) is an initiative to reduce infant mortality in Baltimore City through programs emphasizing policy change, service improvements, community mobilization, and behavior change. It has helped reduce the infant mortality rate in Baltimore City to its lowest point ever: 9.7 deaths per 1,000 live births (2012). Infant mortality has decreased by 28% since the launch of the initiative, from 13.5 in 2009 to 9.7 in 2012; the disparity between white and black infant deaths decreased by almost 40% during same time period.
- Operation Safe Streets is an evidence-based violence prevention program that works to reduce shootings in high violence areas. Safe Streets is based on the belief that violence is a public health disease that can be prevented using disease control methods. Safe streets has a strong street outreach component, with outreach workers connecting with at risk youth to defuse situations and connect youth to services. Safe Streets delivers a unified message that violence is not acceptable.
- The Baltimore Overdose Prevention Plan (Staying Alive) training program teaches individuals how to recognize an opiate or heroin overdose and respond by calling 911 and administering rescue breathing and the drug Naloxone (also known as Narcan).
- Dating Matters seeks to promote healthy relationships as a method to preventing dating violence.
- The Lead Program
- The Needle Exchange Program (NEP) seeks to reduce HIV, hepatitis C, and other infections by reducing the circulation of unclean syringes. The program also helps drug users overcome addiction by linking them to drug treatment services. In addition, the program provides testing for HIV and syphilis. NEP services are provided in 13 locations during 23 weekly time slots in the city of Baltimore.
- Operation Safe Kids (OSK) is a collaboration between the Health Department, the Department of Juvenile Services (DJS) and other state and city agencies that provides intensive community-based case management and monitoring of high-risk juvenile offenders in order to prevent them from becoming victims or perpetrators of violent crimes and ensure that they have the tools they need to become productive adults.
- Don't Die
- Bmore in Control
- Baltimarket is a suite of community-based food access and food justice programs through the Baltimore City Health Department. Baltimarket's mission is to improve the health and wellness of Baltimore City residents by using food access and food justice as strategies for community transformation. This is achieved by promoting nutrition knowledge, skills, and self-efficacy; increased food security; and increased food access while tackling systemic inequities in order to affect the diet, and ultimately health, of food desert residents.

== Organization ==
The Baltimore City Health Department is led by the Commissioner of Health, appointed by the Baltimore City Mayor. The Commissioner is assisted in managing the Department by the Chief of Staff, Deputy Chief of Staff, and deputy commissioners.

Under the Baltimore City Charter, 1996, the Health Department is the city's legally designated public health authority. Responsibilities include:

- “The execution of all laws for the preservation of the health of the inhabitants of Baltimore City, and to exercise those other powers and perform those other duties that are prescribed by law;
- “The establishment and implementation of policy for the treatment and prevention of physical and mental illnesses, and education of the public with respect to environmental, physical, and mental health; (and)
- “General care and responsibility for the study and prevention of disease, epidemics, and nuisances affecting public health.”

=== Health commissioners ===
- Michelle Taylor
  - August 2025 – present
- Simone Johnson, interim
  - July 2024 – August 2025
- Ihuoma Emenuga, MD
  - January 2024 – July 2024
- Letitia Dzirasa, MD, FAAP
  - March 2019 – April 2023
- Leana S. Wen, M.D. M.Sc.
  - December 2014 – October 2018
- Oxiris Barbot, M.D.
  - August 2010 – April 2014
- Joshua Sharfstein, M.D.
  - December 2005 – March 2010
- Peter Beilenson, M.D.
  - September 1992 – June 2005
- Maxie T. Collier, M.D.
  - 1987–1990
- Susan R. Guarnieri, M.D.
  - 1984-1987
- John B. DeHoff, M.D., MPH
  - 1975–1984
- Robert E. Farber, M.D.
  - 1962–1974
- Huntington Williams, M.D.
  - 1933–1961
- C. Hampson Jones, M.D.
- John D. Blake, M.D.
- John C. Travers, M.D.
- Nathan R. Gorter, M.D.
- Geo W. Benson, M.D.
- James Bosley, M.D.

Prior to 1845, the Health Department was under the leadership of more than one health commissioner at a given time. In 1845, the Health Department was reorganized with one sole commissioner of health. In 1900, the Board of Health was abolished and the health commissioner was granted full responsibility for the Health Department.

- John N. Murphy, M.D.
- George A. Davis, M.D.
- John Ijams, M.D.
- Richard Marley, M.D.
- George Rodenmayer, M.D.
- Isaac Glass, M.D.
- Charles S. Davis, M.D.
- Jacob Small, M.D.
- Tho E. Bond, M.D.
- James Aloysius Steuart, M.D.(1828–1903)
  - Baltimore Commissioner of Health from 1873 to 1882
- Jacob Deems, M.D.
- William Reaney, M.D.
- Peter Foy, M.D.
- Thomas S. Sheppard, M.D.
- John Dukehart, M.D.
- John Worthington, M.D. and John Ross, M.D.

== Bureaus and offices ==
The Baltimore City Health Department consists of nine operating divisions and bureaus. These include:

- Animal Services
- Emergency Preparedness and Response
- Environmental Health
- Health Clinics and Services
- HIV/STD Services
- Maternal and Child Health
- School Health
- Seniors
- Youth Violence Prevention

== See also ==
- Leana Wen
- 2015 Baltimore protests
- Stephanie Rawlings-Blake
- Baltimore
- History of Baltimore
- Timeline of Baltimore history
- List of mayors of Baltimore
- Baltimore City Council
- Baltimore City Hall
- Maryland Department of Health
