= Lincoln School for Nurses =

Nursing school in New York City

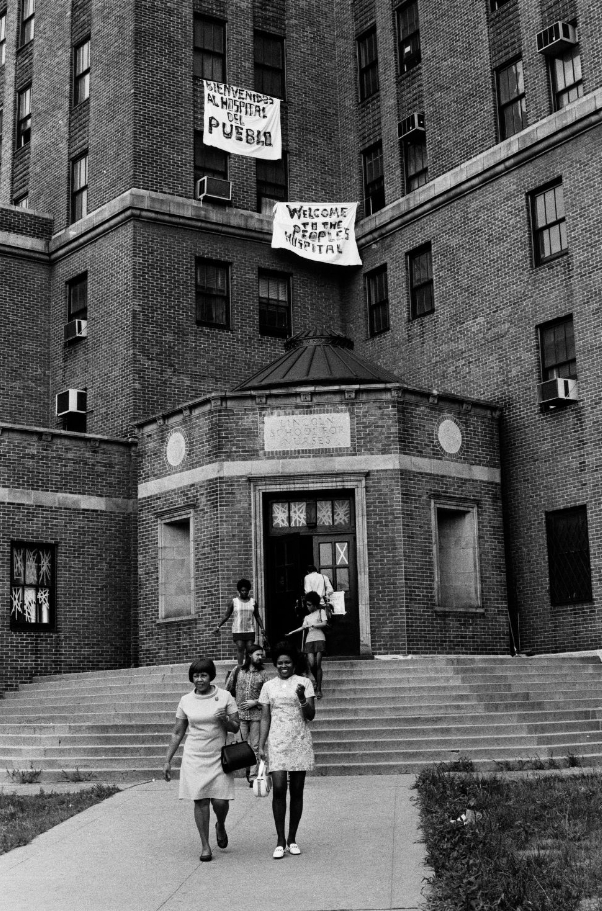
- The former school's entrance in July 1970.
- Other names: Lincoln School of Nursing, Lincoln Hospital School of Nursing; Lincoln Hospital and Home School of Nursing; Lincoln Hospital and Nursing Home School for Nurses, Lincoln Hospital and Nursing Home School of Nursing; Training School for Nurses
- Type: Private nursing school
- Active: 1898–September 5, 1961
- Parent institution: Lincoln Hospital
- Students: 1,864 alumnae
- Location: 141st Street, between Concord Avenue and Southern Boulevard, Mott Haven, The Bronx, New York, US; 40.8070°N 73.9095°W
- Campus: Urban

The Lincoln School for Nurses, also known as Lincoln Hospital and Nursing Home School for Nurses and Lincoln Hospital School of Nursing, was the first nursing school for African-American women in New York City. It existed from 1898 to 1961. It was founded by Lincoln Hospital (then named The Home for the Colored Aged) in Manhattan. The hospital and nursing school moved to 141st Street, between Concord Avenue and Southern Boulevard in Mott Haven, the South Bronx, after 1899.

== History ==
Lincoln Hospital and Nursing Home circa 1915.

The Lincoln School for Nurses was the first and only nursing school for African-American women in New York City, until the municipally funded Harlem Hospital School of Nursing was established in 1923. The Lincoln School for Nurses' first graduating class was in 1900, with a total of six graduates. From 1906 to 1923 Adah Belle Thoms, a 1905 graduate, served as acting director. In 1908, she, along with Martha Minerva Franklin and Mary Eliza Mahoney, organized the first meeting of the National Association of Colored Graduate Nurses, which was sponsored by the Lincoln School for Nurses Alumnae Association.

The 1914 demographics of the hospital and nursing school have been reported as follows: the hospital patients were primarily white; the nursing home patients were primarily black; the doctors were white males; and the nurses and nursing students were black females.

In 1928, Isabel Maitland Stewart directed the first university-sponsored nursing studies using a research team approach. What made the survey unique was that it focused on both the nursing process and results of care in terms of patient comfort and safety.

== Notable alumni ==
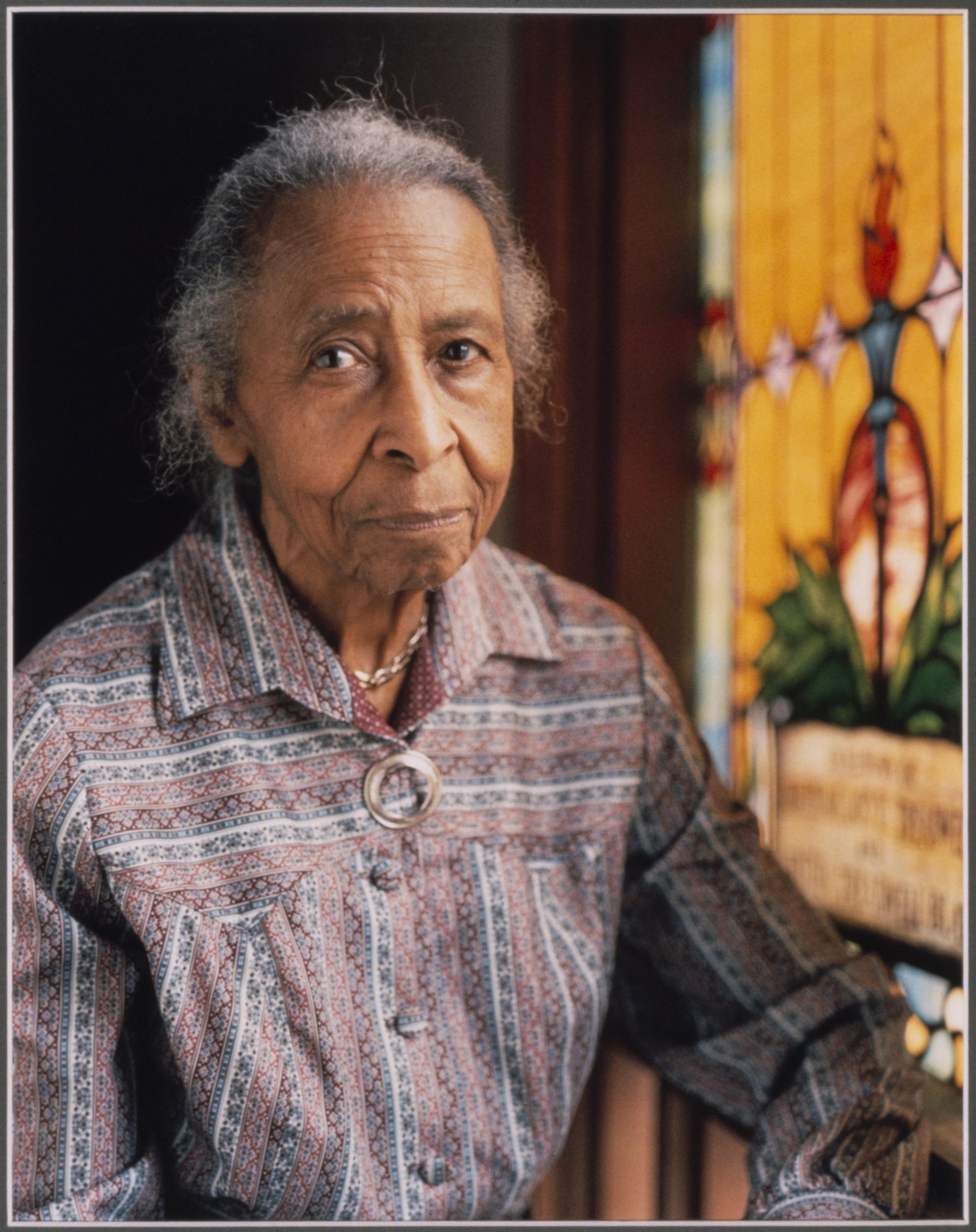
Florence Edmonds

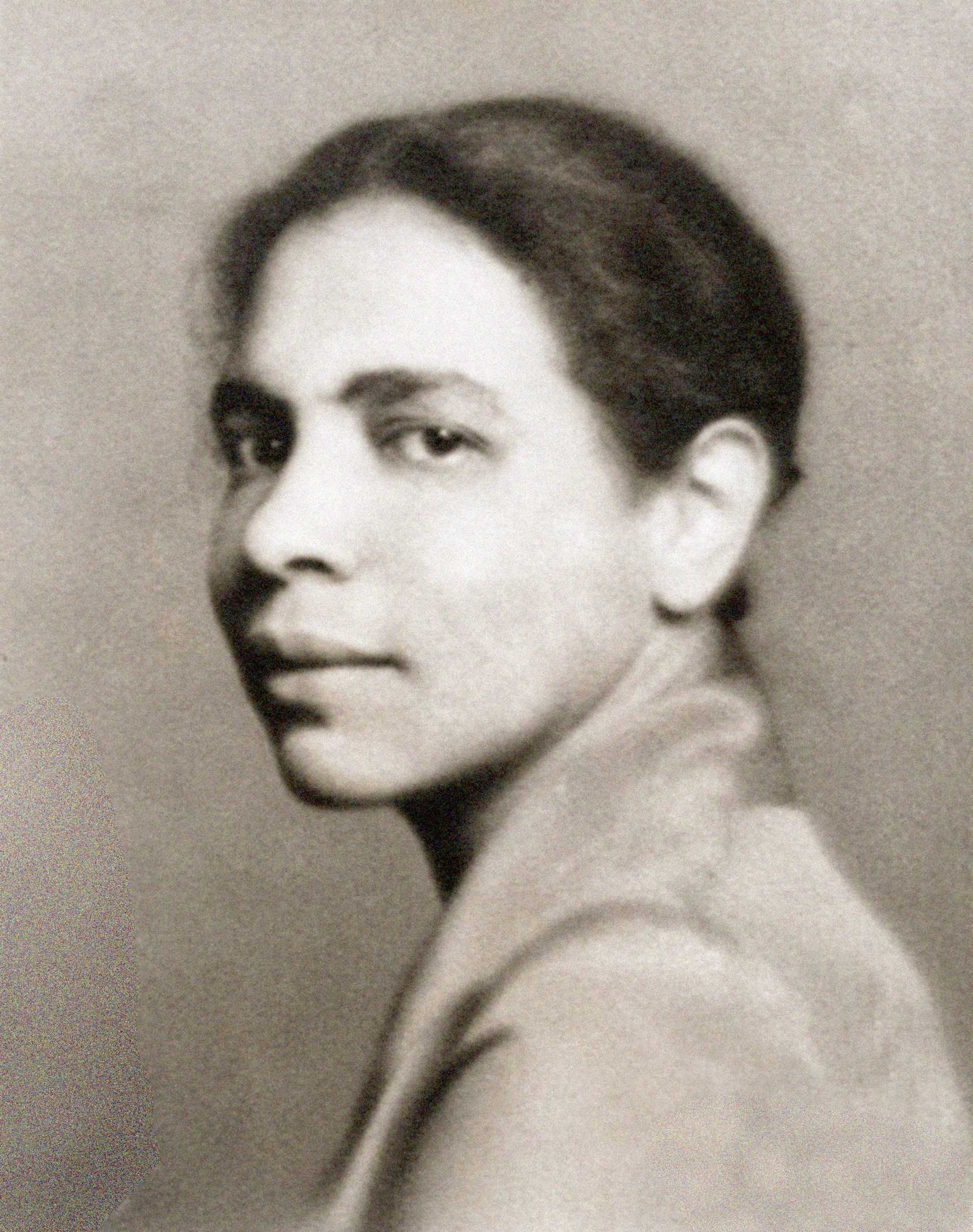
Nella Larsen

- Ianthe Blyden attended in 1946.
- Phyllis Mae Dailey, first African American woman to enter the United States Navy
- Florence Edmonds attended in 1917-1919.
- Mary Elizabeth Carnegie attended in 1932-1936. Former president of the American Academy of Nursing.
- Martha Minerva Franklin took a postgraduate course in 1928.
- Florence S. Gaynor graduated in 1946. Executive director of Sydenham Hospital, and a director at Meharry Medical College.
- Millie Essie Gibson Hale founded Millie E. Hale Hospital in Nashville, Tennessee.
- Lillian Holland Harvey graduated in 1939. Dean of Tuskegee Institute Training School of Nurses.
- Nella Larsen graduated in 1915. Novelist, nurse, librarian. She was involved in the Harlem Renaissance.
- Nancy Leftenant-Colon first black woman allowed to join the desegregated US Army Nurse Corps, 1945.
- Hulda Margaret Lyttle attended in 1913–1914. Dean of Meharry Medical College's School of Nursing.
- Adah Belle Thoms graduated in 1905. Acting director of the school from 1906 to 1923
- Helen Turner Watson graduated in 1939. Professor of nursing at the University of Connecticut.

== See also ==
- Estelle Massey Osborne was an instructor at the school.
- The Harlem Hospital School of Nursing was established in 1923. The second New York City nursing school to accept African-American women.
- List of defunct colleges and universities in New York
- The National Association of Colored Graduate Nurses was established in 1908. Dissolved in 1951.
