= Phyllis Mae Dailey =

American nurse and Navy officer (1919–1976)

- Born: March 12, 1919; New York City, U.S.
- Died: October 31, 1976 (aged 57); New York City, U.S.
- Education: Lincoln School for Nurses; Teachers College, Columbia University
- Military career
- Allegiance: United States of America
- Branch: United States Navy Nurse Corps
- Service years: 1945–1951
- Rank: Lieutenant (junior grade)
- Known for: First African American woman to serve or become a commissioned officer in the United States Navy
- Other work: Nursing educator

Phyllis Mae Dailey (March 12, 1919 – October 31, 1976) was an American nurse and officer who became the first African American woman either to serve in the United States Navy or to become a commissioned Navy officer. An alumna of the Lincoln School for Nurses and Teachers College, Columbia University, she was sworn into the Navy Nurse Corps as an ensign on March 8, 1945. She left the service on May 9, 1951, having earned the rank of lieutenant (junior grade).

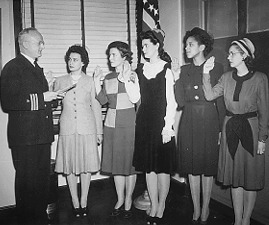
Dailey and four other nurses being sworn into service by Cmdr. Thomas Gaylord, March 8, 1945, in New York (photo from the National Archives)

== Early life and education ==
Dailey was born in New York City to Septimus and Mary Herron Dailey. Her parents had immigrated to America from the British West Indies in 1915. Her father was a carpenter. She graduated from the Lincoln School for Nurses, studied public health at the Teachers College, Columbia University, and worked at a city hospital. After the United States entered World War II, she repeatedly applied to the Army Nurse Corps and Navy Nurse Corps, the latter of which desegregated on January 25, 1945.

== Military service ==
Dailey was sworn into service in the Navy Nurse Corps on March 8, 1945, becoming the first African American woman to serve in the Navy, as well as the first African American woman to become a commissioned Navy officer. Three other African American women—Edith Mazie DeVoe, Helen Fredericka Turner, and Eula Lucille Stimley—also became ensigns in the Navy Nurse Corps during the war. These four were the only Black women out of six thousand nurses who served in the Navy during World War II. In contrast, at the time of Japan's surrender in early September 1945, 479 of the 50,000 Army Nurse Corps were Black, and 6,520 African American women had served in the Women's Army Auxiliary Corps.

While Turner and Stimley left the service by mid-1946, Dailey stayed in the Navy after the war, rising to Lieutenant Junior Grade on April 11, 1948. She was discharged on May 9, 1951, and returned to civilian life.

Dailey was a member of the National Association of Colored Graduate Nurses. She attributed the Nurse Corps' desegregation to the activism of Mabel Keaton Staupers, who fought for the inclusion of Black nurses in the armed forces. First Lady Eleanor Roosevelt also lobbied for integration. Dailey said she "knew the barriers were going to be broken down eventually and felt the more applicants, the better the chances would be for each person."

== Later life ==
Dailey married Headley E. Hanson (January 24, 1916 – August 18, 1995) in January 1947 in New York City. After departing military service, she worked as a clinical nursing instructor for the New York City Board of Education for twenty-four years and lived in Mount Vernon, New York, for twenty-one years. She died at Harlem Hospital after a brief illness at the age of 57, survived by her husband, a son named Robert, and daughters Barbara and Magdalene. Her husband was a motorman who worked for the New York City Transit Authority for thirty-three years before retiring in 1976.
