= Helen Turner Watson =

American nurse and educator (1917–1992)

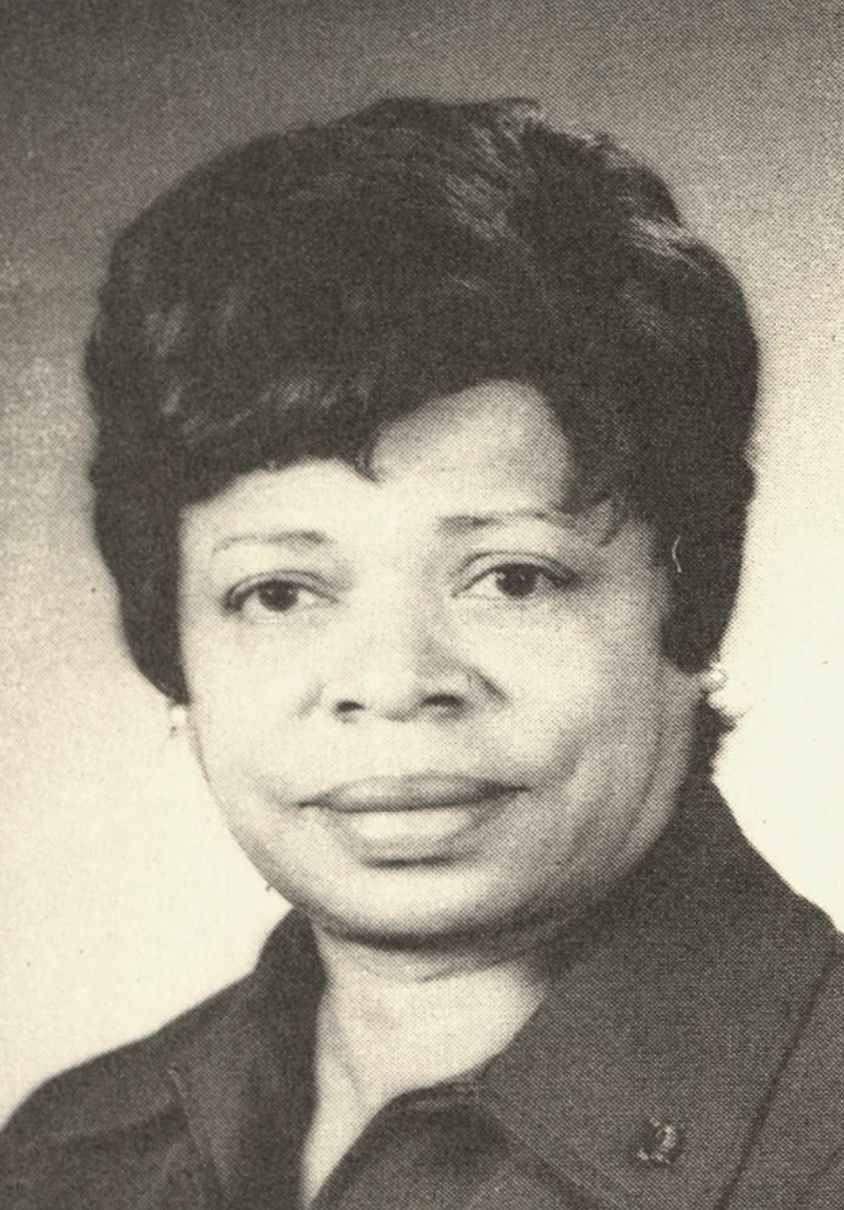
- Watson c. 1976
- Born: Helen Fredericka Turner; July 3, 1917; Augusta, Georgia, U.S.
- Died: September 26, 1992 (aged 75); South Windham, Connecticut, U.S.
- Education: Yale University (MS); University of Connecticut (BS); Lincoln School for Nurses
- Occupations: Nurse, educator
- Employers: University of Connecticut; U.S. Navy Nurse Corps

Helen Fredericka Turner Watson (July 3, 1917 – September 26, 1992) was an American nurse and educator. She was one of the first African American women to receive a commission in the United States Navy, serving as an ensign in the U.S. Navy Nurse Corps from 1945 to 1946. An alumna of the University of Connecticut and Yale University, she became an associate professor at the UConn School of Nursing.

== Early life and education ==
Watson was born in Augusta, Georgia, United States, on July 3, 1917, one of five children of Frederick D. and Helen Gilbert Turner. She grew up in Hartford, Connecticut, where she graduated from Weaver High School in 1935. She attended the Lincoln School for Nurses in New York City and graduated as a registered nurse in 1939.

Watson returned to Hartford to teach in the American Red Cross home nursing and first aid program from October 1939 to January 1941. She also worked as a temporary staff nurse for the Hartford Visiting Nurse Association until October 1941, when she moved to Richmond, Virginia, to study public health nursing on a federal scholarship at the Medical College of Virginia. For two years, she worked as nursing supervisor and community health educator for the Bergen County Tuberculosis and Health Association in Hackensack, New Jersey, while pursuing nursing coursework and fieldwork at Teachers College, Columbia University.

== Military service ==
Watson enlisted in the United States Navy Reserve in New York City on April 20, 1945. She received her officer's commission as ensign in the Navy Reserve Nurse Corps on June 13. She was the second of four African American women to become commissioned officers in the Navy Reserve during World War II. Her newly minted fellow ensigns included Phyllis Mae Dailey of New York City (the first African American woman in history to receive a Navy commission, on March 8), Edith Mazie DeVoe of Washington, D.C., and Eula Loucille Stimley of Centreville, Mississippi. Watson left the Navy in 1946 after the war ended.

== Professional career ==
On leaving the Navy, Watson earned a Bachelor of Science in nursing from the University of Connecticut in 1947 and a Master of Science from Yale University in 1952. Her bachelor's degree focused on public health nursing, while her master's degree focused on mental health nursing in relation to the growth and development of children. Watson worked as a public health and school nursing consultant for the Connecticut State Department of Education from 1948 to 1965. On September 16, 1965, she joined the faculty of the University of Connecticut School of Nursing, where she taught community and child health for eighteen years and achieved tenure at the rank of associate professor. Retiring on June 1, 1983, she received an honorary appointment as Associate Professor Emerita courtesy of the university's board of trustees in 1984.

In addition to her academic duties, Watson served on several statewide commissions. Governor John N. Dempsey appointed her to serve on the State of Connecticut's Committee on the Status of Women and the State Health Coordinating Council. Governor Ella Grasso appointed her to the Commission on Human Rights and Opportunities, Commission on Hospitals and Healthcare (on which she was the sole registered nurse), and Blue Ribbon Committee to Investigate the Nursing Home Industry in Connecticut. Watson also served on the board of directors of the Women's League of Hartford for more than ten years, including five years as president. She was a member of the Connecticut State Nurses Association, Sigma Theta Tau, Phi Lambda Theta, Royal Society of Health, National Organization for Public Health Nursing, American Nurses Association, and American School Health Association.

A former editorial board member of the Journal of School Health, Watson published widely in professional journals. She received the Award for Service to School Children of Connecticut (1961), the National Distinguished Service Award (1962), the Citation for Outstanding Achievement (1963), and the Award for Outstanding Achievements in Nursing Education (1973) from various state and national professional associations.

== Personal life ==
Helen married Harold B. Watson, with whom she had a daughter, Jeannette W. Weldon; a son, Norman S. Watson; and four stepsons, Harold, Richard, Everett, and Kenneth Watson.

Her name was given as Helen Turner Rogers on the University of Connecticut's commencement program of June 1947.

Watson died on September 26, 1992, at the age of 75. Funeral services were held at the First Congregational Church of Willimantic.
