= Angella D. Ferguson =

American pediatrician (1925–2026)

Angella Ferguson
- Born: Angella Dorothea Ferguson; February 15, 1925; Washington, D.C., U.S.
- Died: January 6, 2026 (aged 100); Washington, D.C., U.S.
- Education: Howard University College of Medicine; Bethesda Naval Hospital
- Medical career
- Profession: Doctor
- Field: Pediatrics
- Institutions: Howard University; Freedmen's Hospital
- Research: Physiology

Angella Dorothea Ferguson (February 15, 1925 – January 6, 2026) was an American pediatrician known for her groundbreaking research on sickle cell disease. While studying the normal development of African American children at Howard University, Ferguson noted the high prevalence of sickle cell disease among her patients. A poorly understood disease at the time, sickle cell disease became the subject of Ferguson's studies. Through her subsequent research, she was able to create guidelines on how to diagnose and treat the disease as well as a blood test to detect the disease at birth.

== Early life and education ==
Angella Dorothea Ferguson was born in Washington, D.C. on February 15, 1925, to George Alonzo Ferguson and his wife Mary Burton Ferguson. She was African-American and was one of eight children. Though her father was a high school teacher, had his own architectural firm, and was a U.S. Army reservist, the family struggled financially, especially during the Great Depression. Angella became interested in chemistry and mathematics while attending Cardoza High School, from which she graduated in 1941.

She went on to earn a BS in chemistry from Howard University in 1945, and an MD from Howard University College of Medicine in 1949. At the time there were very few African-American women who were accepted into medical schools. She conducted her internship and residency at Washington Freedman's Hospital and joined the faculty at Howard University in 1953 as an instructor in pediatrics, a position she held until 1959, when she became assistant professor of pediatrics at Freedman's Hospital. She became a full professor at the latter hospital from 1963 to 1990. From 1953 to 1970 she was also an associate pediatrician at Freedman's Hospital. She also completed postgraduate training at Bethesda Naval Hospital in Maryland, where she studied the effects and use of radioisotopes, and obtained a fellowship to do postgraduate work in hematology at Cornell University Hospital.

Concurrently, Ferguson was on the staff of the District of Columbia General Hospital; her tenure there extended from 1963 to 1990. Additionally, she had her own private pediatrics practice in Washington, D.C, where she noticed that most pediatrics research focused on children of European descent. The lack of research on African-American children made it more difficult to provide good care for her patients.

== Research ==
Her early research required her to understand normal development in African American children, but to her surprise no such baseline data existed. In setting out to rectify this gap in knowledge, she made the startling discovery that African American infants learned to sit and stand earlier than infants of European descent. She attributed this trend to the fact that the parents of African American infants often did not have playpens or high chairs for them; hence they learned to sit and stand earlier than their white counterparts.

While collecting data to correlate children's height and weight with age, Ferguson noticed a high prevalence of sickle cell disease among the infants she treated in her practice. In her work she tracked the development of the disease in African American infants. At that time, sickle-cell anemia was a little-known disease, and Ferguson was one of the first researchers to dedicate her studies to sickle cell disease. Through experimentation, she determined that if infants drank a glass of water once a day before age five, the increased blood volume reduced their chances of having a sickle-cell crisis, a condition in which the flow of damaged red blood cells is impeded, causing painful clogging of blood vessels. Ferguson created guidelines for diagnosing sickle cell anemia in children under 12 using a blood test. She also recommended increased use of oxygen during surgery for patients with sickle-cell, since the trauma of surgery increased symptoms. The blood test she developed to detect the disease at birth became a standard test in forty U.S. states by 2010 and remains the standard in most states to this day.

== Administrative career ==
In 1965 Ferguson was given the responsibility of overseeing the design and construction of Freedman's new pediatrics wing, and eventually the renovation of the entire hospital, completed in 1975.

In 1970 she returned to Howard University as head of the University Office of Health Affairs. In 1979 she was promoted to associate vice president for health affairs, a post she held until her retirement in 1990.

== Personal life and death ==
Ferguson married Charles M. Cabaniss, with whom she had two daughters.

Ferguson died on January 6, 2026, at the age of 100.

== Memberships and recognition ==
Ferguson was a member of the National Medical Association, the Society for Pediatric Research, the Society of Nuclear Medicine, and the New York Academy of Sciences. She was the recipient of two Certificates of Merit from the American Medical Association.

== See also ==
- Doris L. Wether
- Mary Styles Harris
