= Ianthe Blyden =

Danish/US Virgin Islands nurse (1899–1984)

- Born: Ianthe Amelia Blyden; April 14, 1899; St. John, Danish West Indies
- Died: June 30, 1984 (aged 85); Saint Thomas, U.S. Virgin Islands
- Occupation: nurse
- Years active: 1916–1969

Ianthe Blyden (April 14, 1899 – June 30, 1984) was a Virgin Islander, born at a time when the islands were held by the Danish. She trained as a nurse and served for fifty-three years at Knud Hansen Memorial Hospital, for thirty-seven of those years she was head nurse. She was instrumental in the development of nursing in the US Virgin Islands and the influence for establishing the island's nursing board.

== Early life ==
Ianthe Amelia Blyden was born on April 14, 1899 in the Danish West Indies. She was the eldest of nine children born to Terecita Blyden, a nurse-midwife, who had come from Saint John. Terecita had been trained by an aunt who had studied the profession in Copenhagen. The family owned a sugar manufactory in Saint John at Annaberg and another at Mary's Point. Blyden completed her schooling through age thirteen, the maximum schooling at the time.

== Career ==
Blyden began her career as a teacher on Saint John at the age of fifteen for a salary of $2.50 per month. After a year, she decided not to pursue teaching and instead went to the Danish Municipal Hospital in Charlotte Amalie to study nursing under the doctors there. In 1916, she began working as a nurse for the monthly salary of $5.00. The following year, the Danish West Indies were sold to the United States, which brought in Navy Nurses to implement a three-year training program. She became a nurse-anesthetist and worked in the pharmacy and laboratory as an assistant. She also acted as a midwife when needed.

In 1932, during the malaria epidemic, she was appointed head nurse, becoming the first native-born islander to hold the post. Climbing the professional ladder, she was made chief nurse, nursing supervisor and finally director of nurses. In 1946, having graduated from the Municipal Hospital School of Nursing, Blyden took a leave from her supervisory duties to complete post-graduate studies in surgical nursing at the Lincoln School for Nurses in The Bronx, New York City. In the early 1950s, soon after the Danish doctor, Knud Hansen died, the old Danish Hospital was replaced with a new facility, named in his honor. In 1952, when the Colonial Council passed the inaugural Nurse Practice Act, Governor Morris de Castro appointed Blyden, Ilva Benjamin, Clarissa Milligan, Ingerborg Nesbitt, and Josephine Singleton for the Board of Nursing. Blyden was the driving force in the formation of the St. Thomas Chapter of the Licensed Practical Nurses Association, which formed in 1956.

Blyden retired in 1969 after having served for fifty-three years in nursing with thirty-seven of those as a head nurse.

== Death and legacy ==
Blyden died on June 30, 1984, in St. Thomas and her services were held at the Memorial Moravian Church.
