= Frances Elliot =

Frances Elliot may refer to:

- Frances Reed Elliot, the first African American woman accepted into the American Red Cross Nursing Service
- Frances Minto Elliot, English writer
