= Adah Belle Thoms =

American nurse (1870–1943)

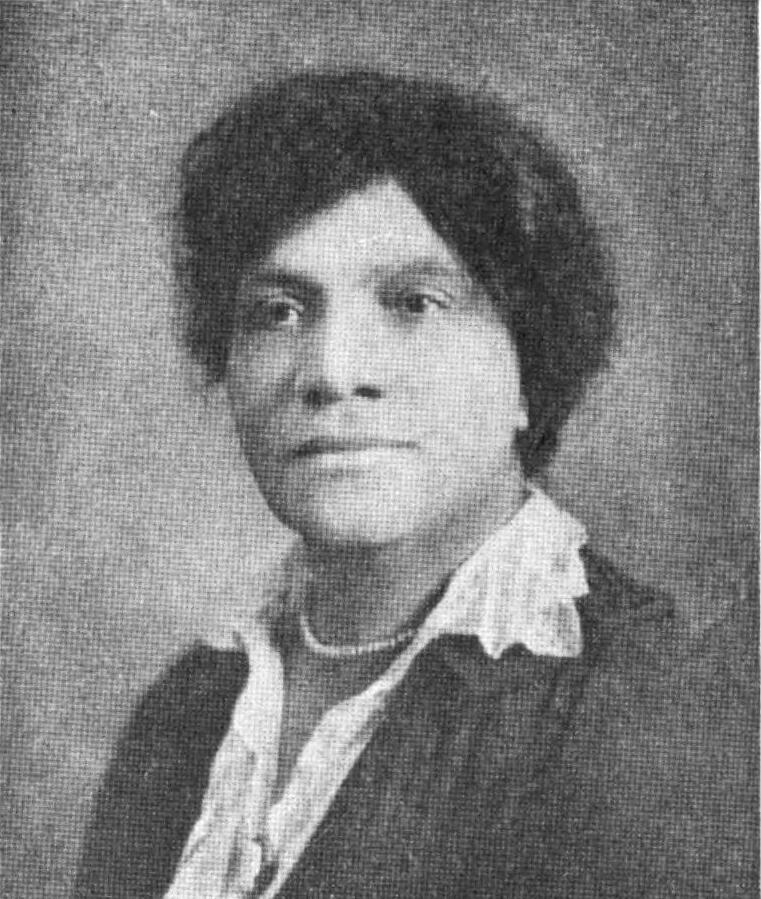
- Born: January 12, 1870
- Died: February 21, 1943 (aged 73)
- Occupation: Nurse

Adah Belle Samuels Thoms (January 12, 1870 – February 21, 1943) was an African American nurse who cofounded the National Association of Colored Graduate Nurses (serving as President from 1916 to 1923), was acting director of the Lincoln School for Nurses (New York), and fought for African Americans to serve as American Red Cross nurses during World War I and eventually as U.S. Army Nurse Corps nurses starting with the flu epidemic in December 1918. She was among the first nurses inducted into the American Nurses Association Hall of Fame when it was established in 1976.

== Biography ==
Thoms was born Adah Belle Samuels in Richmond, Virginia, to Harry and Melvina Samuels.

As a young woman, she married briefly, and kept the surname Thoms. Before she became a nurse, she was a school teacher in Richmond, Virginia. In the 1890s, she went to New York to study elocution and speech at Cooper Union. She then studied nursing at the Women's Infirmary and School of Therapeutic Massage, graduating in 1900 as the only black woman in a class of thirty.

Thoms continued her education at the Lincoln Hospital and Home School of Nursing, a school for black women, graduating in 1905. Although she served as acting director between 1906 and 1923, racist policies prevented her receiving the official title of director.

Thoms became involved in international efforts to advance the nursing profession, attending the International Council of Nurses in 1912.

In the first part of the 20th century, Thoms worked with Martha Minerva Franklin and Mary Mahoney to organize the National Association of Colored Graduate Nurses. The organizing meeting was held at Lincoln Home and Hospital, and hosted by Thoms, in 1907. The organization, founded in 1908 by a group of 52 black nurses, aimed to secure the full integration of black women nurses into the nursing profession. Focused on the American Nurses' Association, nursing education programs, employment opportunities, and equal pay, the organization was ultimately dissolved by president Mabel Keaton Staupers in 1950, after successfully integrating the US Armed Forces (WWII) and the American Nurses' Association (1948).

Thoms served as president of the NACGN from 1916 to 1923, and played a critical role in lobbying the American Red Cross to permit black nurses to enroll during World War I, in order to lead to service in the U.S. Army Nurse Corps. The Surgeon General agreed to limited enrollment of African American nurses in the Army Nurse Corps in July 1918. Enrollments started during the flu epidemic in December 1918.

Thoms was received at the White House by President Warren G. Harding and his wife Florence in 1921, during the National Association of Colored Graduate Nurse Convention in Washington, D.C.

In 1923, she remarried, to Henry Smith, who died within the year.

Adah Belle Samuels Thoms died in New York City, February 21, 1943.

== Nursing profession ==
Thoms moved to Harlem, New York in 1893 to pursue her aspirations to become a nurse. This was mainly because African Americans had better opportunities for advancement up North. Thoms enrolled in a nursing course at the Women's Infirmary and School of Therapeutic Massage as a start to nursing.

In 1903, Thoms entered the program and was offered the position as head nurse of one of the surgical wards in 1904. In 1905, Thoms was hired as the head nurse at the Lincoln Hospital and Home. A year later, she was promoted to superintendent of nurses and acting director and kept the positions until she retired in 1923.

== Civil rights and black feminist activism ==
Thoms served as an acting director of Lincoln Hospital and Home School of Nursing from 1906 to 1923 and was never promoted to full director because of racial discrimination.

In 1908, Adah met Martha Minerva Franklin, who at the time was striving towards holding a conference for 52 graduate black nurses. Franklin wanted the support of Lincoln School for Nurses Alumnae Association, who eventually sponsored the meeting. The idea of establishing an organization for African-American nurses attracted Thoms, leading to the development of the National Association of Colored Graduate Nurses.

Because of Thoms' experience with discrimination, it drove her to start the NACGN with Franklin in order for African-American nurses to achieve higher professional standards and develop leadership among black nurses.

== Recognitions ==
- American Nursing Association, Hall of Fame - Original inductee, in 1976
- Mary Mahoney Medal, 1936, the first recipient of the award from the National Association of Colored Graduate Nurses

== See also ==
- Lincoln School for Nurses
- National Association of Colored Graduate Nurses
- Harlem Hospital School of Nursing
