= Petra Pinn =

American nurse (1881–1958)

- Petra Pinn, from a 1986 book
- Born: Petra Fitzalieu Pinn; February 9, 1881; Zanesville, Ohio, US
- Died: February 21, 1958 (aged 77); Xenia, Ohio, US
- Other names: Petra F. Walker (during marriage 1911-1913)
- Occupations: Nurse, hospital administrator
- Known for: President of the National Association of Colored Graduate Nurses (1923–1924)

Petra Fitzalieu Pinn (February 9, 1881 – February 21, 1958) was an American nurse and hospital administrator, and president of the National Association of Colored Graduate Nurses (NACGN) in 1923 and 1924.

== Early life ==
Petra Pinn was born in Zanesville, Ohio, the daughter of William H. Pinn and Mary Elizabeth (Lizzie) Hicks Pinn. Her father was born in 1840, enslaved on a plantation in Warrenton, Virginia; in adulthood, he worked at a glass factory and was a policeman in Ohio.

Pinn trained as a nurse at the Tuskegee Institute, graduating in 1906, and was founder and president of the nursing program's alumni association.

== Career ==
Pinn began her nursing career in Montgomery, Alabama. From 1909 to 1911, she served as superintendent of nurses and matron at a Red Cross sanitarium and training school in Louisville, Kentucky. She was in private nursing positions for several years, then in 1916 she moved to Palm Beach, Florida, to help open and run Pine Ridge Hospital. She moved to New York City and worked at the Seaview Hospital on Staten Island. In 1931 she sued and won a cash award from a hospital in South Carolina after a contract dispute, though the legal process dragged into 1932. In 1932, she was director of nurse training at Bethune–Cookman College.

She joined the National Association of Colored Graduate Nurses (NACGN) early in her career. She represented the NACGN at the American Nurses Association meeting in Atlanta in 1920. In 1923, she was elected president of NACGN; she resigned the presidency in 1926 for health reasons. She served as treasurer of the organization from 1929 to 1946, and won the NACGN's first Mary Mahoney Award in 1939. She retired from nursing and from NACGN in 1946.

== Personal life ==
Pinn was married in Louisville in 1911, to William D. Walker. They divorced in 1913, and she reassumed her birth name. In retirement, Pinn lived with her sister in Wilberforce, Ohio. She died at a hospital in Xenia, Ohio in 1958, after a stroke, aged 77 years.
