= Archie Alexander =

American architect and engineer

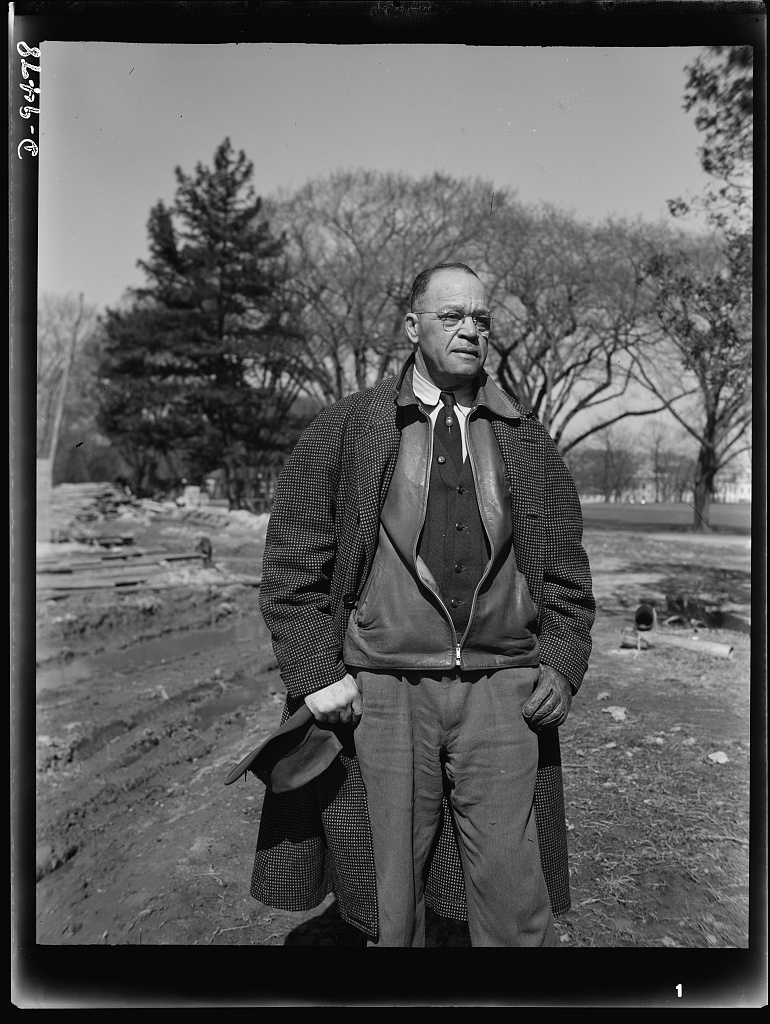

Governor of the United States Virgin Islands
- In office April 9, 1954 – August 31, 1955
- President: Dwight Eisenhower
- Preceded by: Morris de Castro
- Succeeded by: Charles Claunch (acting)

Personal details
- Born: Archibald Alphonso Alexander; May 14, 1888 Ottumwa, Iowa, U.S.
- Died: January 4, 1958 (aged 69) Des Moines, Iowa, U.S.
- Party: Republican
- Spouse: Audra Linzy (m. 1913)
- Education: Highland Park College (attended); Cummins Art College (attended); University of Iowa (BS)

Archibald Alphonso Alexander (May 14, 1888 – January 4, 1958) was an American architect and engineer. He was an early African-American graduate of the University of Iowa and the first to graduate from the University of Iowa's College of Engineering. He was also a governor of the U.S. Virgin Islands.

== Early life and education ==
Alexander was born in Ottumwa, Iowa, to Price and Mary Hamilton Alexander, part of a small African American community. He was the eldest of their nine children. When the family moved to a farm outside Des Moines, Price became head custodian at the Des Moines National Bank. Alexander graduated from Oak Park High School in 1905. He then attended Highland Park College and Cummins Art College before matriculating at the State University of Iowa (later known as the University of Iowa) to study engineering. Not only was Alexander the only African-American student at the University at the time, but he was the first African-American student to graduate from the University of Iowa's engineering program. He graduated in 1912. His professors warned Alexander that it would be difficult for him to find work as an African-American engineer. Alexander was also a football player at the University of Iowa, where he was a three-year starting tackle and earned the nickname "Alexander the Great". Throughout college, Alexander worked multiple part-time jobs to support himself and pay tuition. Alexander was also a member of the predominantly black Kappa Alpha Psi fraternity. During the summer, Alexander worked as a draftsman for Marsh Engineering Company, a Des Moines company that designed many significant bridges. In 1921, Alexander also studied bridge design at the University of London while on a sabbatical. He later obtained his civil engineering degree from Iowa State University in 1925.

== Career ==
=== Engineering and architecture ===
After graduating, Alexander worked as a foreman for Marsh Engineering Company before forming his own engineering company at the age of 26. Alexander's firm, named A. A. Alexander, Inc., initially specialized in bridges. He partnered with Euro-American contractor George F. Higbee for eight years before Higbee's death. After Higbee's death, Alexander ran the company alone for four years. His significant projects during this time included the University of Iowa's heating and cooling system.

In 1926, Alexander was honored with a Harmon award for his distinguished achievement in business and engineering. The same year, he also received the Laurel Wreath Award, Kappa Alpha Psi's highest award for lifetime achievement.

In 1929, he took on his former classmate and football teammate Maurice A. Repass as a junior partner and changed the firm's name to Alexander & Repass. Their first major project was a multimillion-dollar sewage treatment plant in Grand Rapids, Michigan. Their work also focused on many roads and bridges across the nation, including construction of the Whitehurst Freeway and an extension to the Baltimore–Washington Parkway. The firm was hired to build a bridge and seawall at the Tidal Basin in Washington DC, where Alexander brought in an integrated construction crew. Their firm also constructed the Moton Airfield, where the Tuskegee Airmen trained, as well as an apartment building for the National Association for Colored Women. Alexander's firm became so successful Ebony magazine declared it "the nation's most famous interracial business" in 1949. Ultimately, Alexander spearheaded over 300 projects throughout his career.

In 1925, the University of Iowa granted him an honorary master's degree in engineering. Howard University awarded Alexander with an honorary Doctor of Engineering in 1946. Although some sources claim Alexander was awarded the NAACP's prestigious Spingarn Medal, the NAACP does not list him as a recipient.

=== Politics ===
Alexander began his political career in 1932, when he served as the assistant chairman of the Iowa Republican State Committee, a position that he held again in 1940. In 1934, Alexander was appointed as part of an investigative team that looked into economic development possibilities for Haiti. Throughout the 1930s, Alexander was an active member of the Republican Party. He aggressively campaigned for Dwight D. Eisenhower's White House bid in 1952. In addition to his work for the Republican Party, Alexander was also active in African-American organizations. Alexander served as a charter member and the 1944 president of the Des Moines chapter of the NAACP. He was also president of the Negro Community Center Board and a trustee at both Howard University and the Tuskegee Institute.

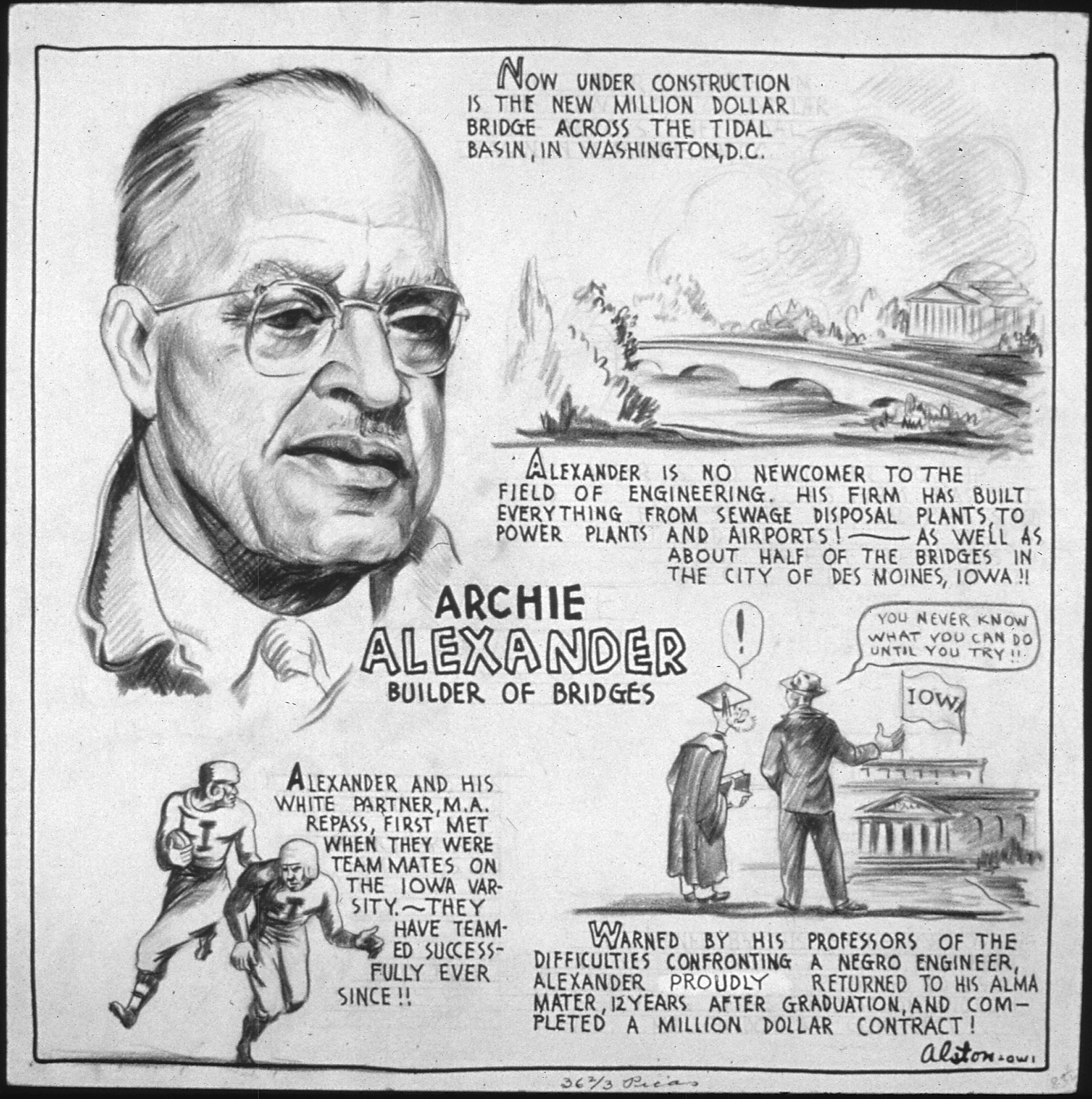
"Archie Alexander - Builder of Bridges" created by Charles Henry Alston

In 1954, Alexander was appointed Governor of the United States Virgin Islands by President Dwight D. Eisenhower. He was the first Republican governor there since the establishment of the civil government. His tenure at the post was short and controversial. In 1955, he was highly criticized for favoring old business partners in contracts for road building on St. Thomas. The United States House of Representatives launched a probe, and he subsequently resigned on August 18, 1955, ostensibly for health reasons.

== Personal life ==
Alexander married Audra A. Linzy in Denver, Colorado, in 1913. They had one child, Archibald Alphonso Jr., who died as a young child.

Alexander died of a heart attack in 1958 in Des Moines, Iowa.

== Legacy ==
Upon the death of his wife Audra Linzy Alexander in 1973, the University of Iowa, Tuskegee Institute, and Howard University received funds for engineering scholarships as stipulated in Alexander's will. Each university received a trust with over 100,000 dollars (approximately $1.5 million in 2009 dollars altogether) for endowed engineering scholarships.

The Archie Alphonso Alexander papers are held at the University of Iowa Special Collections & University Archives.

Political offices
Preceded by Morris de Castro	Governor of the United States Virgin Islands; 1954–1955	Succeeded by Charles Claunch; Acting
