= Estelle Massey Osborne =

African American nurse (1901–1981)

- Born: Estelle Massey; May 3, 1901; Palestine, Texas, United States
- Died: December 12, 1981 (aged 80)
- Education: Columbia University
- Occupations: Nurse, educator
- Spouses: Bedford N. Riddle; Herman Osborne

Estelle Massey Riddle Osborne (May 3, 1901 – December 12, 1981) was an African American nurse and educator. She served in many prominent positions and worked to eliminate racial discrimination in the nursing field.

== Early life and education ==
Estelle Massey was born in Palestine, Texas in 1901, the eighth of eleven children. Despite being uneducated and working in menial jobs, her parents, Hall and Bettye Estelle Massey, sent all of their children to college.

Estelle received a teaching certificate from Prairie View State Normal and Industrial College (now Prairie View A&M University), but decided to move into nursing after she was nearly killed in a violent incident while teaching at a public school. She joined the first nursing class of St. Louis City Hospital #2 (later Homer G. Phillips Hospital), and became a head nurse there after graduating in 1923.

In 1926 or 1927 she moved to New York City, to teach at the Lincoln School of Nursing and the Harlem Hospital School of Nursing. She attended summer sessions at Teachers College, Columbia University, and eventually attended as a full-time student with the aid of a scholarship from the Rosenwald Fund. She received a bachelor's degree in 1930, and a master's in nursing education in 1931, becoming the first African American to do so.

She married Dr. Bedford N. Riddle in 1932.

== Career ==
Estelle Massey Riddle became educational director at Freedmen's Hospital (now Howard University Hospital) in Washington, D.C. In 1934 she worked as a researcher for the Rosenwald Fund, then returned to Homer G. Phillips Hospital in St. Louis to become its first black director of nursing.

In 1943, she was appointed as a consultant to the National Nursing Council for War Service. In this role she recruited student and graduate nurses and acted as a liaison to nursing schools, working to change discriminatory policies. By the end of World War II, 20 new nursing schools had begun admitting black students, the Cadet Nurse Corps had inducted 2,000 black members, and bans on black nurses had been rescinded by both the Army and Navy.

In 1945 she became the first African American instructor at New York University's Department of Nursing Education. In 1954 she became Associate Professor of Nursing Education at the University of Maryland.

In 1972 she taught at Central Nursing School of Lincoln Junior College in Kansas City, Missouri.

== Organization memberships ==
- Member of Alpha Kappa Alpha sorority
- President of the National Association of Colored Graduate Nurses (NACGN), 1934–1939
- American Nurses Association Board of Directors (ANA's first black elected official), 1948–1952
- ANA delegate to the International Council of Nurses, 1949
- National League for Nursing Assistant Director, 1959
- National Council of Negro Women Local Program Committee chair
- Key Women of Greater New York
- National Association for the Advancement of Colored People (NAACP)
- National Urban League

== Awards and recognition ==
- Mary Mahoney Award, 1946
- New York University Nurse of the Year, 1959
- Teachers College Nursing Education Alumni Association honorary life membership, 1976
- American Academy of Nursing honorary membership, 1978
- Estelle M. Osborne Memorial Scholarship established, 1982
- American Nurses Association Hall of Fame, 1984
- New York University annual Estelle Osborne Celebration established, 1991
- Chi Eta Phi Omicron Chapter honorary life membership

== Personal life ==
In 1932, Massey married Dr. Bedford N. Riddle. This marriage ended in divorce, and in 1947 she married Herman Osborne, public relations director of the United Mutual Life Insurance Company. She had no children.
