= Yvette Francis-McBarnette =

American pediatrician

- Born: Yvette Francis; May 10, 1926; Kingston, Jamaica
- Died: March 28, 2016 (aged 89); Alexandria, Virginia
- Education: Hunter College; Columbia University; Yale School of Medicine
- Occupations: Pediatrician, Haematologist
- Known for: Pioneer in the treatment of the sickle cell anaemia
- Spouse: Olvin R. McBarnette
- Parent(s): Clarence and Sarah Francis

Yvette Francis-McBarnette (May 10, 1926 – March 28, 2016) was an American pediatrician and a pioneer in treating children with sickle cell anaemia.

== Early life and education ==
Francis-McBarnette was born in Kingston, Jamaica on 10 May 1926 to schoolteachers Clarence and Sarah Francis. The family moved to New York City when she was a toddler. She graduated from Hunter College High School at the age of 14, then she enrolled at Hunter College and completed a bachelor's degree in chemistry, followed by a master's degree in chemistry at Columbia University. In 1946, aged 19, she enrolled at the Yale School of Medicine - she was the second black woman at the school. Francis-McBarnette completed her paediatrics residency at Michael Reese Hospital in Chicago.

She returned to school in 1978, to complete a residency in internal medicine and a fellowship in hematology at Bronx-Lebanon Hospital Center. This allowed her to continue treating patients that she had originally seen in her pediatric sickle cell anemia screening program.

== Career ==
Francis-McBarnette's first medical position was at Bellevue Hospital in New York City. She later became director of the sickle cell anaemia clinic at Jamaica Hospital Medical Centre in Queens and managed the St Albans Family Medical Center. In 1966, together with colleagues Dr. Doris Wethers and Dr. Lila Fenwick, she started the Foundation for Research and Education in Sickle Cell Disease.

Francis-McBarnette used antibiotics with her patients, with positive results, although the effectiveness was not confirmed until fifteen years later in an article in The New England Journal of Medicine. By 1970 her clinic had screened over 20,000 school children for the disease, placing those with the disease on antibiotics, which some continued to take throughout their lives.

She was invited to join a White House committee focusing on effective management of the disease. The committee's work led to the 1972 National Sickle Cell Anemia Control Act, signed by President Richard Nixon, which used federal funds for screening, counselling, education and research.

== Personal life ==
She married Olvin McBarnette in 1959, and the couple had six children.

In her mid-70s, Francis-McBarnette enrolled in graduate philosophy courses at Hunter College. She also owned a summer home in Oak Bluffs, Martha’s Vineyard, where she and her family spent summers.

== Selected publications ==
- Francis, Y. F. (1972). "Current Status of Sickle Cell Disease and Outlook for Research Programs". J Natl Med Assoc. 64 (6): 549–1032. PMC 2608956.
- Francis, Y. F. (1972). "Current Status of Sickle Cell Disease and Outlook for Research Programs". Journal of the National Medical Association. 64 (6): 549–1032. PMC 2608956.
- "Screening and genetic counseling programs for sickle cell trait and sickle cell anemia". J Am Med Women's Assoc. 29 (9): 406–10. Sep 1974.
- Francis, Y. F.; Worthen, H. G. (Jul 1968). "Hyposthenuria in sickle cell disease". J Natl Med Assoc. 60 (4): 266–70. PMC 2611560. PMID 5661193.
- Francis, Yvette Fay. "Sickle Cell Disease." Collier's Encyclopedia 1997 ed.
