= Lillian Holland Harvey =

Nurse, educator and doctor

Lillian Holland Harvey, Dean of Tuskegee School for Nurses

Lillian Holland Harvey (1912–1994) was an American nurse, educator and doctor known for her contributions to medical education. She was an activist for the equal rights of African Americans. Harvey's accomplishments were achieved at a time in history when both African Americans and women faced extreme discrimination in academics and the medical field. She was seen as a leader in her community and led a successful professional and personal life.

== Education and career ==
Harvey was an African American woman born in the town of Holland, Virginia now known as Suffolk, Virginia. After graduating from high school she moved to New York to attend the Lincoln Hospital School of Nursing. Harvey received her nursing diploma in 1939, going on to study at Columbia University where she eventually graduated and earned her bachelor's degree in the year 1944. Her dedication to further her own knowledge as well as teaching others led to the completion of a master's at Columbia University's Teachers College in 1948. Later, she re-enrolled at Columbia to receive her doctorate degree in 1966.

Established in September 1892, Tuskegee School for Nurses was a historically black nursing school that offered only a three-year nursing program beginning 1908. Harvey became director of nurse training in 1945 and in 1948 became Dean. In 1949 she initiated a process of turning the diploma program into a baccalaureate program. It would be the first of its kind in the state of Alabama. In 1953 nursing students were now able to receive a Bachelor's of Science in Nursing. The program was fully accredited by the National League for Nursing in 1957. Within the program, students could gain hands on experience both in their home state at the John A. Andrew Hospital as well as outside, which included medical practices in Massachusetts, Florida, New York, and Connecticut. Harvey served as the Dean of Nursing at Tuskegee Institute for twenty five years before retiring in 1973. After retirement she was active in the National Negro Business and Professional Women's club. In addition to this, Harvey went on to serve as a member of the Board of Directors of the National League for Nursing. She was involved in multiple distinguished organizations including American Red Cross, the Kellogg Foundation, and the American Journal of Nursing Company. Harvey was also an advisor in the U.S. Public Health Service's committee for Professional Traineeships.

== Accomplishments ==
Throughout her career and afterwards Harvey received much accolade for her contributions. She was a recipient of the Mary Mahoney Award from the American Nurses Association National Awards Program in 1982 and in 1992 the Tuskegee University Board of Trustees named the Nurses Home “Lillian Holland Harvey Hall” in Harvey's honor. In 1999, Harvey was elected into the Alabama Healthcare Hall of Fame. She was also a 2001 Alabama Nursing Hall of Fame Inductee and the Alabama State Nurses' Association had an award set up in her name.

== Civil rights ==
Harvey was involved in civil rights activism and desegregation. During WWII, she used her position as the Dean of the Tuskegee School for Nurses to train black nurses for military service and created opportunities for them to enter the Army Nurse Corps. She worked to desegregate the Alabama Nurses’ Association by attending their meetings, an 80-mile drive from Tuskegee to Montgomery and at these meetings, she was required to sit in a separate section. Despite this discrimination, she still made her voice prominent in these meetings and advocated for nurses and nursing students.

Harvey was also a member of the education committee of the President's Commission for the Status of Women (PCSW). The PCSW, founded by Esther Peterson during the Kennedy administration, focused on the changing social roles of American women in the 1960s regarding employment, home and family life, and civil and political rights143. Peterson ensured that black women were included in the Commission; however, Harvey was the only African American woman on the education committee. The primary purpose of the education committee was to discuss social concerns such as “the need for day care, the value of volunteers, the nature of women’s home life, and preparation for female adulthood." Specifically, Harvey advocated for the improvement of urban settings, and wanted “the African American community to support its own needs."

== Personal life ==
Harvey was married to Baptist minister Reverend Raymond Francis Harvey and together they had three children. Harvey died in 1994 at the age of eighty-two, just two years after her husband.

== Legacy ==
Harvey's leadership impacted the lives of many young African Americans and her dedication as Dean of Nursing influenced progression towards equal opportunity in both education and civil rights.
