= Doris L. Wethers =

American pediatrician (1927–2019)

Doris Louise Wethers
- Born: December 14, 1927; Passaic, New Jersey, United States
- Died: January 28, 2019 (aged 91); Yonkers, New York, United States
- Education: Queens College; Yale University School of Medicine
- Occupation: Pediatrician
- Employer(s): Knickerbocker Hospital; Sydenham Hospital; St. Luke's–Roosevelt Hospital Center
- Known for: Sickle-cell disease research
- Spouse: Garvall H. Booker (m. 1953; died 1996)
- Children: 2

Doris Louise Wethers (December 14, 1927 – January 28, 2019) was an American pediatrician known for her research on sickle-cell disease.

Wethers was born in Passaic, New Jersey on December 14, 1927, to William and Lillian (née Wilkinson) Wethers. She graduated magna cum laude from Queens College in 1948, majoring in chemistry, and earned her M.D. at Yale University School of Medicine in 1952 (becoming the third Black woman to do so), after which Wethers spent ten years as a pediatrician in private practice. Her office was located next to the office of her father, physician William Wethers.

Wethers became the first Black attending physician at St. Luke's–Roosevelt Hospital Center in 1958. She served as medical director for Speedwell Services for Children from 1961 to 1973, and as director of pediatrics and opening sickle-cell anemia programs at Knickerbocker Hospital (1965–1973), Sydenham Hospital (1969–1974), and St. Luke's Hospital (1974–1979). She received a grant for research on sickle-cell disease in 1979.

She conducted research at St. Luke's–Roosevelt Hospital Center and conducted in-patient rounds for medical students learning about sickle-cell disease. Wethers served as director of the hospital's sickle cell program until retiring in 1999.

Wethers also co-founded the Foundation for Research and Education in Sickle Cell Disease with Drs. Yvette Fay Francis-McBarnette and Lila A. Fenwick.

In 1987, Wethers acted as the chairwoman of a panel on sickle-cell screening commissioned by the National Institutes of Health. The panel recommended that all newborn babies, regardless of ethnicity, be tested routinely for sickle-cell anemia; by 2006 this practice had been implemented in all fifty states.

Wethers died after a stroke on January 28, 2019, in Yonkers, New York, aged 91.

== Works ==
- "Doris L. Wethers". Microsoft Academic Search.

== See also ==
- Sickle cell disease
- Angella D. Ferguson
