= Isabel Maitland Stewart =

Canadian nurse

- Born: January 14, 1878
- Died: October 5, 1963 (aged 85)
- Occupation: Nurse

Isabel Maitland Stewart (January 14, 1878 – October 5, 1963) was a Canadian nurse. She was the founder of the Winnipeg General Hospital Nursing Alumnae and member of the first legislative committee that helped establish the Manitoba Association of Graduate Nurses.

== Early life and education ==
Stewart was born on January 14, 1878, the fourth oldest of nine children. She came from a family of Scottish descent, due to the heritage of both her parents. Stewart was born to father Francis Beattie "Frank" Stewart (1840-1914) and mother Elizabeth Farquharson (1845-1919).

== Career ==
Stewart attended and graduated from the Winnipeg General Hospital Training School for Nurses, but was disappointed by the lack of hands-on training and education. She thus enrolled at Columbia University Teachers College and earned a bachelor's and master's degree. Stewart and Mary Adelaide Nutting, the principal of the School of Nursing, led the National League of Nursing's The Standard Curriculum for Schools of Nursing. By 1925, she took over the program after Nutting's retirement, and became the Helen Hartley Jenkins Foundation Professor of Nursing Education and Director of the program. After her retirement, the Teachers College announced a professorship in her name, titled the "Isabel Maitland Stewart Research Professorship of Nursing." In 1928, Stewart directed the first University-sponsored studies in nursing using a research team approach at Lincoln Hospital School of Nursing. What made the survey unique was that it focused on both the nursing process and results of care in terms of patient comfort and safety.

During WW1, Stewart Chaired the Vassar Training program for nurses. She later became a founder of the Winnipeg General Hospital Training School for Nurses alumnae program and a member of the legislative committee that helped establish the Manitoba Association of Graduate Nurses. Her main ambition was to train nursing school teachers. Stewart also Chaired the Education Committee of the International Council of Nurses. By 1944, she was elected vice-president of the American Council on Education. Two years later she received the Finland Medal for Humanitarian Work.

In 1956, she was the recipient of an honorary degree of law from the University of Manitoba. Stewart died in October 1963.

=== Legacy ===
In 1978, Columbia University Teachers College created the Isabel Maitland Stewart Fund. They also started the annual Stewart Conference on Research in Nursing.

== Selected publications ==
The following is a list of selected publications:

- Opportunities in the field of nursing (1930)
- The education of nurses: historical foundations and modern trends
- The foundations of modern nursing in America. Vol. 6, Education of nurses
- A Short History of Nursing (with Lavinia Dock)
- A History of Nursing
