= Charles Kenneth Claunch =

Charles Kenneth Claunch, Sr.
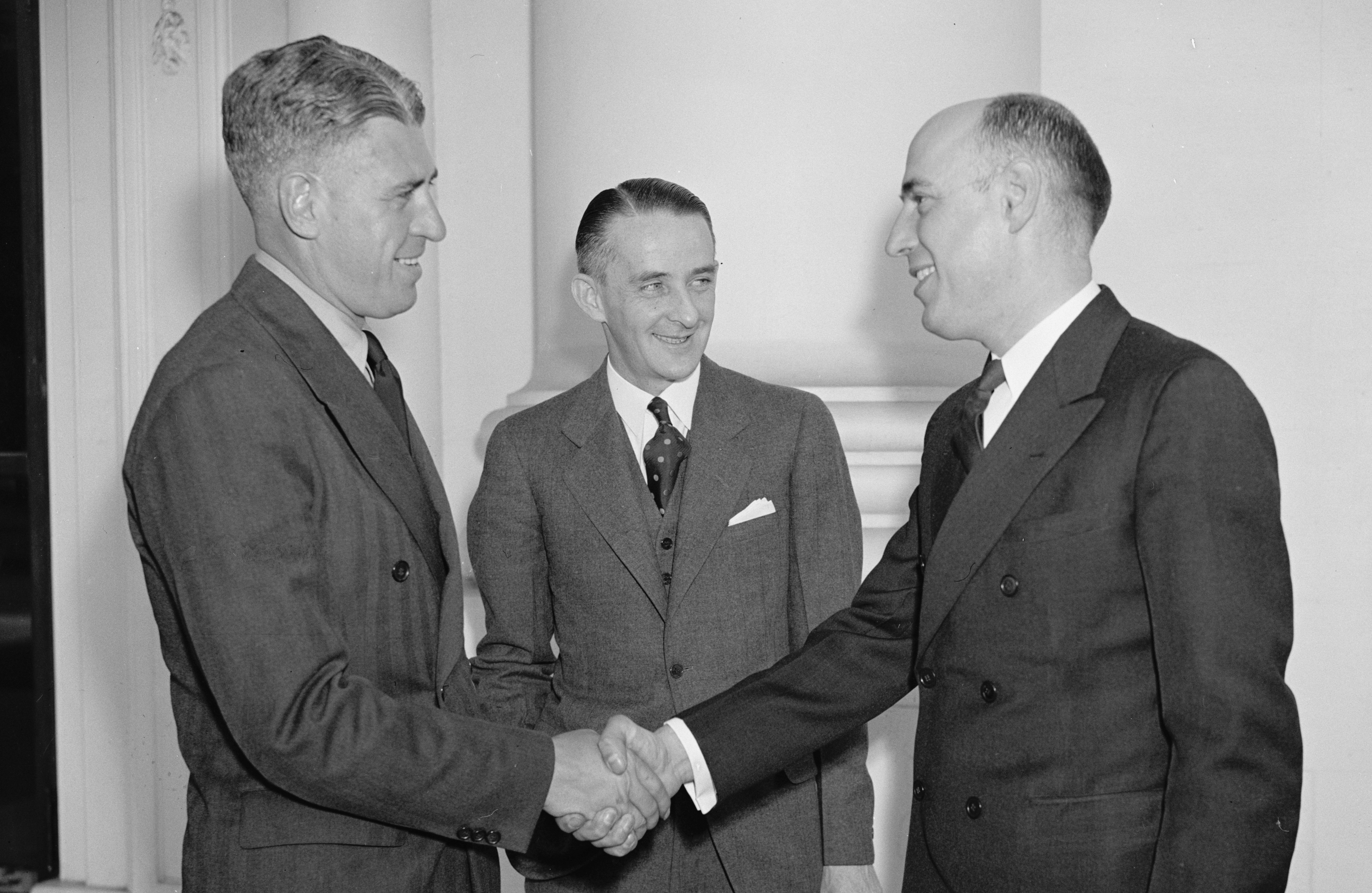
- Claunch (c)
- Born: October 7, 1899; Chicago, Illinois
- Died: November 9, 1978 (aged 79); Ormond Beach, Florida
- Occupation: Politician

Charles Kenneth Claunch, Sr. (October 7, 1899 – November 9, 1978) was an usher for the White House who was appointed as Government Secretary to the United States Virgin Islands and was briefly acting-Governor in 1955 after a scandal.

== Biography ==
Claunch was born in Chicago, Illinois, and joined the United States Navy in 1918 where he was assigned to the White House as an assistant to a naval aide. In 1938, with a rank of chief petty officer, he resigned from the Navy to accept a position as an usher in the White House. In 1943, his wife committed suicide.

He was appointed Government Secretary, a position in the territorial government equivalent to Lieutenant Governor of a state, on March 25, 1954. After a scandal and the resignation of Governor Archie Alexander, Claunch was made acting-Governor from August 17 to October 31, 1955. He was reportedly offered the position of full Governor, but declined. The Washington Post reported that he was the only white man to have served under Alexander's government. He resigned in 1957. He died on November 9, 1978, in Ormond Beach, Florida.

== See also ==
Preceded by Archibald A. Alexander	Governor of the U.S. Virgin Islands; 1955; Acting-Governor	Succeeded by Walter A. Gordon
