= Nancy Leftenant-Colon =

American nurse (1920–2025)

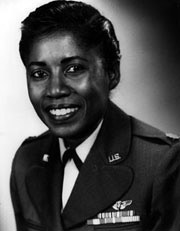
- Leftenant-Colon circa 1940s
- Born: Nancy Leftenant; September 29, 1920; Goose Creek, South Carolina, U.S.
- Died: January 8, 2025 (aged 104); Amityville, New York, U.S.
- Occupation: Nurse

Nancy Leftenant-Colon (September 29, 1920 – January 8, 2025) became the first African American in the regular United States Army Nurse Corps in March 1948 after it was desegregated.

== Life and career ==
Leftenant was born September 29, 1920, in Goose Creek, South Carolina, near Charleston. Her parents were Eunice and James Leftenant and she was one of their 12 children. Her father was the son of a freed slave. The family moved to New York in 1923 and built their own home in Amityville, Long Island. She hyphenated her husband's name after they married, to Leftenant-Colon. She died in Amityville, New York on January 8, 2025, at the age of 104.

She finished high school in 1939 and then trained at the Lincoln School for Nurses in the Bronx and then worked in a local hospital. In January 1945 she was allowed to join the United States Army Nurse Corps as a Second Lieutenant reservist and was initially assigned to Lowell Hospital in Massachusetts. In 1946 she was promoted and assigned to 332nd Station Medical Group in Ohio on Lockbourne Army Air Base. One notable incident was when the local hospital would not treat a black woman who had gone into premature labor. Leftenant-Colon and a flight surgeon managed the delivery of the 3 pound weight premature baby at the air base and the child survived.

In 1952, Leftenant-Colon became a flight nurse in the US Air Force. She was assigned overseas, including during the Korean and Vietnam wars. She was aboard the first medical evacuation flight into the French outpost during the battle of Dien Bien Phu. She reached the rank of major and in 1965 retired from the military and her post as Chief Nurse at McGuire Air Force Base, New Jersey. She continued to work, as a school nurse in Amityville Memorial High School until 1984.

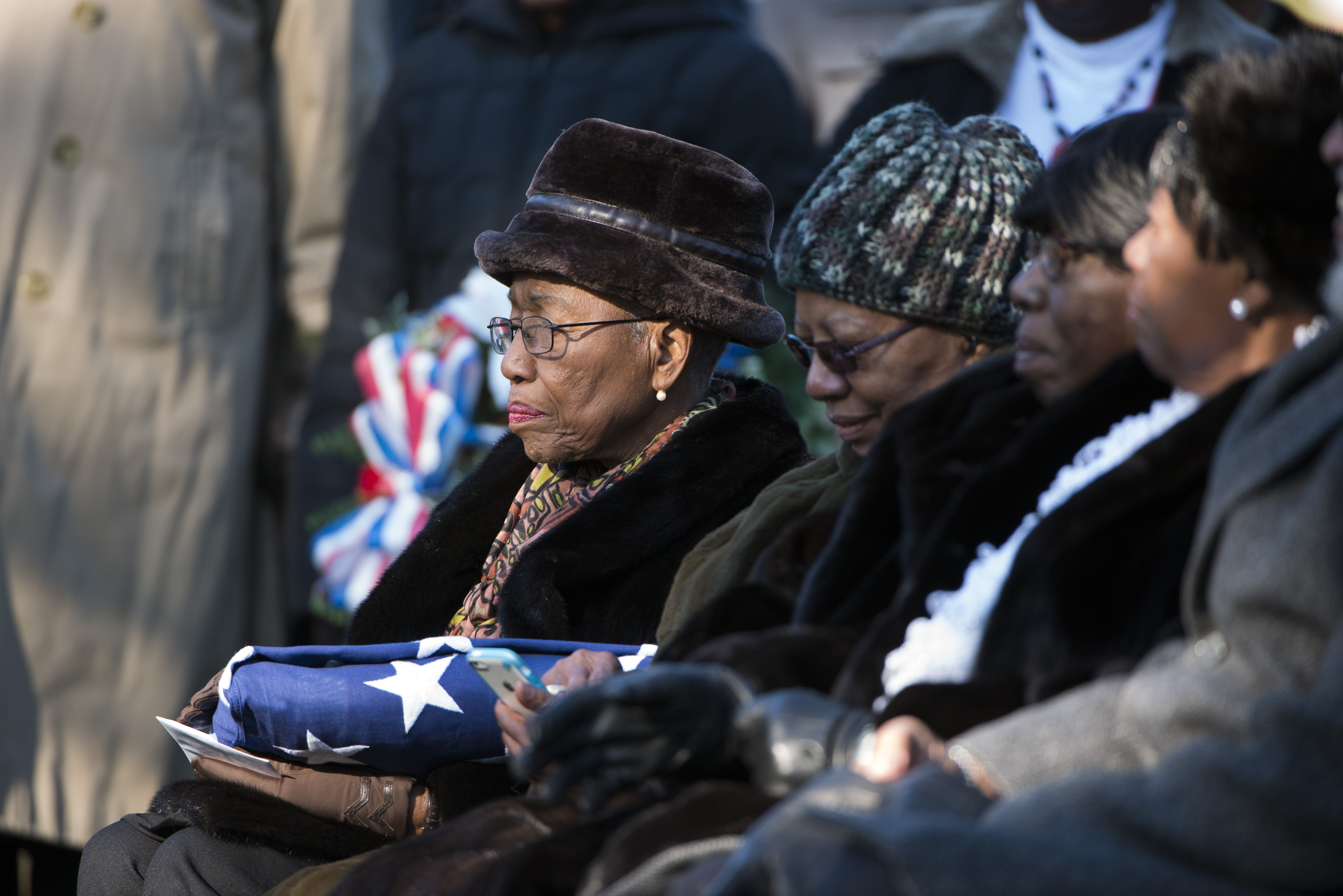
Leftenant-Colon (left) in 2016

Leftenant-Colon was awarded an honorary Doctorate of Humanities from Tuskegee University and an honorary Doctorate of Humane Letters from University of Mount Saint Vincent in New York. In 1989, she was the first woman national president of the Tuskegee Airmen Inc. One of her brothers had been a pilot in the Tuskegee Airmen who was killed in a mid-air collision and four other siblings were also in the military. In 2018, a construction of a new media center at Amityville High School was announced, named after Leftenant-Colon.

== Sources ==
- New York Times obituary
