= Lila Fenwick =

American lawyer (1932–2020)

- Born: May 24, 1932; Manhattan
- Died: April 4, 2020; Manhattan
- Education: Harvard Law School, Barnard College, London School of Economics
- Occupations: Lawyer, human rights defender
- Employer: United Nations Human Rights Committee (1960s–1973)

Lila Althea Fenwick (May 24, 1932 – April 4, 2020) was an American lawyer, human rights advocate, and United Nations official. She was the first black woman to graduate from Harvard Law School.

== Early life and education ==
Fenwick was born in Manhattan, New York City, on May 24, 1932. Her parents, John and Hilda Fenwick, were immigrants to the United States from Trinidad. She earned a bachelor's degree in history from Barnard College in 1953, before enrolling at Harvard Law School. A student in the class of 1956, Fenwick matriculated into the school's fourth class that admitted women. She then continued her studies at the London School of Economics.

== Career ==
During her career, Fenwick was a private practice lawyer in the Bronx, and chief of the U.N. Human Rights Section, focused on indigenous peoples, migration, gender, race, and religious discrimination issues. She retired from the United Nations in 1973, before her section's headquarters moved to Geneva. She also co-founded the Foundation for Research and Education in Sickle Cell Disease with Doris Wethers and Yvette Fay Francis-McBarnette. Harvard's Black Law Students Association offers a Ruffin-Fenwick Trailblazer Award, named for Fenwick and for George Lewis Ruffin.

== Personal life ==
Fenwick died at her home in Manhattan on April 4, 2020, from complications of COVID-19, at the age of 87.
