= Florence S. Gaynor =

US Nurse and Hospital administrator

Florence Small Gaynor (October 29, 1920 – September 16, 1993) was a nurse and hospital administrator, who was the first black woman to head a major teaching hospital in the United States.

== Early life and education ==
Born in Jersey City, New Jersey, she graduated Lincoln High School at the age of 15 and applied to Jersey City Medical Center to study nursing, but was rejected as they did not admit Blacks, instead studying nursing at Lincoln Hospital, graduating in 1946. Later in her career, Gaynor received her Bachelor of Science in Nursing and her Master of Science in public health at New York University, and studied the Scandinavian health system at the University of Oslo in 1965.

== Career ==
After graduating as a nurse from Lincoln Hospital, Gaynor began working at Queens General Hospital. She then worked for the New York City's Health Department and then as head nurse at Francis Delafield Hospital in Washington Heights and as a school nurse with the Board of Education in Newark.

Gaynor began working in hospital administration at Lincoln Hospital and became assistant administrator in 1970. In 1971 she was selected from a field of 20 candidates, the rest of them men, to become the executive director of Sydenham Hospital, making her the first black woman to head a major teaching hospital in the United States. In 1972 she accepted a position as executive director of Martland Hospital in Newark, a 600-bed teaching hospital, and then became a director at Meharry Medical College in Nashville from 1976 to 1980, followed by a director position at the West Philadelphia Community Mental Health Consortium in Philadelphia from 1980 to 1984. For her final two years before retiring, she worked as a school nurse, in Los Angeles.

On September 16, 1993, Gaynor died of a sudden brain hemorrhage at the age of 72.
