= Carrie E. Bullock =

American nurse

Carrie E. Bullock (c. 1887 – December 31, 1962) was an American nurse. She served as the president of the National Association of Colored Graduate Nurses (NACGN) and founded their official newsletter.

== Biography ==
Bullock was born in Laurens, South Carolina and raised by her grandparents who were former slaves. Bullock attended the Presbyterian Missionary School in Aiken, South Carolina. In 1904, she graduated from the Scotia Seminary in Concord, North Carolina. She taught school for two years in South Carolina before she enrolled in nurses' training school at Dixie Hospital in Hampton, Virginia. She soon transferred to Provident Hospital in Chicago and graduated from nursing training in 1909. That same year, she joined the Chicago Visiting Nurses Association. In 1919, she was promoted to supervisor of the black nurses in the Chicago association. In 1926, she became the supervisor of the Dearborn section. In 1940, she was awarded the first of two 30 year service pins for her work at the Visiting Nurses Association. When she reached 40 years of work, she was awarded a gold watch. She retired from the Visiting Nurses Association on June 1, 1956.

Bullock was active as a volunteer in the National Association of Colored Graduate Nurses (NACGN). She organized the annual meeting of NACGN in Chicago in 1923. She was elected vice-president of NACGN at the Chicago meeting. By the end of the 1920's Bullock also helped set up a grant from the Rosenwald Fund to train one black nurse per year. Bullock was the NACGN president from 1927 until 1930. She worked to increase communication in the black nursing community. In 1928, Bullock founded the NACGN's newsletter, the National News Bulletin, which she edited. In 1938, she was awarded the Mary Mahoney Award for outstanding achievement in nursing and human services by NACGN.

After Bullock retired from nursing, she continued to work as a volunteer at Provident hospital. She also worked with children at the Grace Presbyterian Church. She died on December 31, 1962, in Billings Hospital.
