= Hulda Margaret Lyttle =

American nurse educator and hospital administrator

Hulda Margaret Lyttle Frazier (1889–August 7, 1983) was an American nurse educator and hospital administrator who spent most of her career in Nashville, Tennessee at Meharry Medical College School of Nursing and affiliated Hubbard Hospital. Lyttle advocated for the modernization and professionalization of African American nurses' training programs, and improved practice standards in hospitals that served African Americans.

Lyttle was the first African American to pass the State of Tennessee's nursing license exam.

== Early life and education ==
Hulda Margaret Lyttle was born in Nashville, Tennessee to David and Rebecca Lyttle in 1889.

In 1910, Lyttle enrolled in the first class at George W. Hubbard Hospital's Training School for Nurses, later known as the School of Nursing at Meharry Medical College. In 1913, Lyttle successfully completed her training—along with Rhonda A. Pugh and Lula Woolfolk—and became a member of the school's first graduating class. In 1914, Lyttle attended Lincoln Hospital School of Nursing in New York City, one of the few schools that enrolled African American nursing students, where she earned a six-month training certificate.

Lyttle earned a bachelor of science degree from Tennessee Agricultural and Industrial State College In 1938. In 1939 she began a fellowship from the Rockefeller Foundation to study nursing school organization and administration at the University of Toronto School of Nursing.

== Nursing career ==
After finishing at Lincoln Hospital School of Nursing, Lyttle took a temporary position at Southern University's School of Nursing as Supervisor of Nursing. In 1915, her work at Southern University ended, Lyttle returned to Nashville and passed the Tennessee State Board Examiners nursing licensing exam.

She became the Director of the Hubbard Training School of Nursing and in 1923, she was appointed Superintendent of Hubbard Hospital. In 1931, Meharry Medical College and Hubbard Hospital moved to a large campus in northern Nashville.

In 1938, Lyttle was named dean of the newly named, School of Nursing, which had higher acceptance standards. In 1938, Meharry School of Nursing was accredited by the State University of New York. Lyttle retired from Meharry in 1943.

After retiring from Meharry, Lyttle spent a year at United Service Organizations (USO) in North Carolina. She later moved to Houston, Texas, where she was to manage a recently inaugurated school of nursing. In 1948 Lyttle took a position at University of California as the administrator of the School Health Programs.

Lyttle relocated to in Hot Springs, Arkansas to take the position of Superintendent at. National Baptist Bath House Hospital.

== Nursing organizations ==
=== Lambda Pi Alpha Sorority ===
Lyttle organized the first Lambda Pi Alpha Sorority in 1930 at Meharry Medical College School of Nursing. It was granted a charter by the State of Tennessee in 1932. By 1931 there were seven chapters located across the United States in Nashville, Tennessee, Atlanta, Georgia, Kansas City, Missouri, Indianapolis, Indiana, and New Orleans, Louisiana.

=== National Association for Colored Graduate Nurses ===
In 1936, Lyttle was elected first vice president of the National Association of Colored Graduate Nurses. In 1939 she was elected president of the organization's southern region.

== Later life ==
Lyttle married S. M. Frazier in May 1954 and the couple relocated to Miami, Florida.

=== Later education ===
In 1958 Lyttle received a vocational certificate from Florida's State Department of Education. In 1959 she took extension courses at Florida Agricultural and Mechanical University and received a teaching certificate from the state of Florida in 1961.

=== Recognition ===
In June 1946, the student nurses' residence at Meharry was named Hulda Margaret Lyttle Hall. It was recognized on the National Register of Historic Places in 1998 as a building of historical interest for its architecture and relevance as African American heritage landmark. In 2009 Meharry received a one million dollar grant from U.S. Department of Interior American Recovery and Reinvestment Act for repairs and restoration.

== Death and legacy ==
Lyttle died at Cedars of Lebanon Medical Center in Miami on August 7, 1983.

== List of academic writings ==
- School for Negro Nurses: At the George W. Hubbard Hospital and Meharry Medical College Nashville, Tennessee. Hulda M. Lyttle American Journal of Nursing Vol. 39, No. 2 (Feb., 1939), pp. 133–138.
