= Morris Fidanque de Castro =

Morris de Castro

Governor of the United States Virgin Islands
- In office October 21, 1949 – April 9, 1954; Acting: October 21, 1949 – March 4, 1950
- Preceded by: William H. Hastie
- Succeeded by: Archie Alexander

Personal details
- Born: February 5, 1902 Panama City, Panama
- Died: December 9, 1966 (aged 64) Christiansted, U.S. Virgin Islands, U.S.
- Party: Democratic

Morris Fidanque de Castro (February 5, 1902 – December 9, 1966) was an American politician who served as Governor of the United States Virgin Islands.

== Early life ==
De Castro was born in Panama City, Panama. Although he was Jewish, de Castro attended Roman Catholic High School of St. Thomas. His father was merchant David de Castro and his mother was Adah Fidanque. Immediately after graduating high school, de Castro obtained a job working as a clerk in the island's sanitation office. Over the years, de Castro remained in government and gradually rose through the ranks until he was appointed as the Commissioner of Finance in 1934.

In 1939, de Castro was briefly made acting governor while Lawrence William Cramer was attending hearings in Washington, D.C.. This role usually fell to the government secretary, such as Robert Herrick in 1935, but de Castro given the position instead. During his brief tenure, the United States Virgin Islands was honored by an "unofficial" state visit by Frederik IX of Denmark, then still the Crown Prince, and his wife, Ingrid of Sweden. Over the years, de Castro continued to be a prominent choice whenever an acting governor was necessary.

In 1944, he was promoted from Commissioner of Finance to an assistant to Governor Charles A. Harwood. In 1945, he was made government secretary and held that position until he was appointed full governor by President Harry S. Truman on February 28, 1950. (He was inaugurated March 4.) Though he was aware that he was under consideration for the position (he had been again made acting governor in the interim), he did not campaign for it though he indicated that he would take it, if offered. De Castro's appointment was considered by many as a symbol that the United States wanted increased self-government for its territories.

== Governor of the United States Virgin Islands ==
As governor, de Castro worked to increase the self-sufficiency of the islands. Almost immediately after his appointment, he signed a law that stiffened penalties and enforcement for discrimination in the territory, largely in response to a growing problem of private "clubs" and resorts which increasingly catered exclusively to mainland whites, rather than locals. He also campaigned with the federal government to allow the territory to keep the tax revenue collected on the export of rum. Previously, this had been collected by the federal government to offset the territory's old debts. He also sought to allow the territory to elect its own governor.

However, during his term, de Castro was forced to make concessions which were not universally popular. In 1953, he rescinded his previous remarks that the territory should elect its own governor. Instead, he clarified that it should only elect its own governors when they were self-sufficient, and not sooner. De Castro also worked to revamp the territorial's treasury. Under the old system, taxes collected in Saint Thomas could not be used to help those in Saint Croix, and vice versa. He pushed for a single unified treasury that could benefit all of the islands. This position was unpopular due to the locals not wanting the wealth of Saint Thomas being used to shore up the poorer islands.

De Castro also worked to boost tourism and industries on the island. During his term, he passed an 8-year property tax exemption for manufacturers and hotel owners, to allow industry to grow.

In 1954, de Castro resigned as governor. He was given the Department of the Interior's Distinguished Service Medal in recognition of his efforts. However, instead of retirement, he returned to work in the financial department of the territory for subsequent governors. At his death in 1966, he was the budget director for Governor Ralph M. Paiewonsky.

== See also ==
- List of minority governors and lieutenant governors in the United States

Political offices
Preceded by William H. Hastie	Governor of the United States Virgin Islands; 1949–1954; Acting: 1949–1950	Succeeded by Archie Alexander
