= Mary Styles Harris =

American geneticist

- Born: June 26, 1949 (age 77); Nashville, Tennessee, U.S.
- Education: Lincoln University, Cornell University, University of Georgia
- Known for: Sickle cell disease research
- Scientific career
- Fields: Genetics
- Workplaces: Spelman College

Mary Styles Harris (born June 26, 1949) is an American biologist and geneticist, president of Harris & Associates in Atlanta, Georgia, and owner of Biotechnical Communications, which produced the television documentary "To My Sister...A Gift for Life."

Hari's media productions spotlight health issues of African Americans. These include campaigning for the need for the early detection of breast cancer, the genetics of sickle-cell anemia and greater understanding of diabetes-related concerns. Other topics explored include AIDS, cervical cancer, colon cancer, hypertension and prostate cancer.

Harris has been an advocate for bridging the gap in transparency in public health education between government officials and scientists so that important health information is made available to the public.

== Early life ==
Harris was born in Nashville, Tennessee to George and Margaret Styles, while her father was earning his medical degree from the city's Meharry Medical College. Harris mother, Margaret, earned a degree in business administration at Tennessee State University.

Soon after Harris was born the family moved to her father's hometown of Miami, Florida, where her parents built up her father's medical practice. However, Harris's father died in 1958 when Harris was nine years old.

== Education ==
Harris was one of the first African Americans to enroll at Miami Jackson High School, graduating twelfth in her class of 350 in 1967.

She became one of the first women to enroll at Lincoln University in Pennsylvania, spending most of her time with pre-med students. She then turned down a place at the University of Miami Medical School, to pursue a research career.

After graduating from Lincoln University in 1971, Harris enrolled at Cornell University where she studied molecular genetics, supported by a Ford Foundation Doctoral Fellowship. Harris earned her doctorate in 1975 and was a research associate, studying the virology of tumors, in the medical school at Rutgers University from 1975 to 1977.

== Career ==
After graduating from Cornell, Harris was awarded a post-doctoral fellowship by the National Cancer Institute. She went onto the New Jersey University of Medicine and Dentistry where she researched the genetic composition of viruses.

In 1977, Harris became the executive director of the Sickle Cell Foundation of Georgia. In this role, she was responsible for raising money for sickle cell research - a condition mainly affecting people of African descent - and for educating the public on the disease. For her work, she received a National Science Foundation Science Residency Award in 1979. This led to a series of documentaries on science and medicine and, in 1980, Harris won the Glamour Magazine's Outstanding Working Woman Award at an award ceremony hosted by President Carter at the White House.

Harris later became the Director of Genetic Services for the Georgia Department of Human Services, with the mandate of influencing public health policies in the state and across the nation. She served as director for three years after which she worked for two years as a project-coordinator of genetic screening of newborn infants, and an assistant professor at Morehouse College in 1978 and Atlanta College from 1980 to 1981.

In 1987, Harris founded Biotechnical Communications, which creates audiovisual educational materials on health topics. Harris has produced television and radio shows, and hosts a call-in radio show, Journey To Wellness: African American Health Radio and developed a documentary, To My Sisters... A Gift For Life, focusing on breast cancer in African American Women.

Harris's work focused on sickle cell anemia and genetic screening, particularly in African American communities. She later founded Biotechnical Communications to improve science communication and health education for underrepresented communities.

== Personal life ==
Harris married Sidney Harris, a Morehouse graduate, shortly after she obtained her doctoral degree. They were both admitted to Cornell University and moved to Ithaca, New York where he had been accepted into a graduate engineering program and she worked at the university's genetics research center. Mary and Sidney Harris have one daughter.

== Awards ==
- 1979–80: Governor's Advisory Council on Alcohol and Drug Abuse
- 1979–80: Women's Forum of Georgia
- 1979–80: Georgia Human Genetics Task Force
- 1979–80: Congressional Black Caucus Health Brain Trust; Georgia Board of Regents, University of Georgia
- 1979–80: board member, CDC Foundation
- 1979–80: Scientist in Residence for WGTV Channel 8
- 1980: Glamour Magazine's Outstanding Working Woman Award
- 1979: National Science Foundation Science Residency Award
- 1977: Public health Association, American Society for Human Genetics
- 1971: Ford Foundation Doctoral Fellowship

== Sources ==
- Krapp, Kristine M. (1999). Notable Black American scientists. Detroit: Gale Research. pp. 349 pages. ISBN 0-7876-2789-5.
- Henderson, Ashiya N (2001). Who's Who Among African Americans. Detroit: Gale Group. ISBN 0-7876-3635-5.
- American Men and Women and Science. 16th edition (New York: McGraw-Hill), p. 521.
- Blacks in Science and Education. Vivian O. Sammons. (Washington, D.C.: Hemisphere Publishers), 1989. p. 112–113.
