= Edith DeVoe =

American nurse

- 13th Annual Meeting of the National Council of Negro Women, in Washington, DC, on October 12, 1948
- Born: Edith Mazie DeVoe; October 24, 1921; Washington, D. C., U.S.
- Died: November 17, 2000 (aged 79) Laurel, Prince George's County, Maryland
- Buried: Quantico National Cemetery
- Allegiance: United States of America
- Branch: United States Navy
- Service years: 1940–1960

Edith DeVoe (October 24, 1921 – November 17, 2000) was an American nurse. She was the second Black woman admitted to serve in the United States Navy Nurse Corps during World War II, the first Black nurse to be admitted to the regular Navy, and the first Black nurse to serve in the Navy outside the mainland United States.

== Early life ==
Edith Mazie DeVoe was born on October 24, 1921 in Washington, D. C. to Sadie Frances (née Dent) and Joseph Edward DeVoe. Both of her parents were employed in government service, and the family consisted of four children, Elizabeth, Edith, Joseph, and Sadie. Her brother died in 1934, and both of her sisters became nurses.

DeVoe completed her primary education at Randall Junior High and Dunbar High School.

She enrolled in nursing school with her sister Elizabeth at the Freedman's Hospital nursing school, graduating in 1942. She supplemented her education with public health nursing courses in Richmond, Virginia at the St. Philip School of Nursing.

== Career ==
DeVoe began her career working for the Visiting Nurse Association. On 18 April 1945, one week after the first Black Navy nurse, Phyllis Mae Dailey, was assigned to active duty, DeVoe was commissioned as an ensign in the United States Navy Reserve. She was assigned to her first active duty on 13 June 1945, and served for two years during World War II at the Boston Navy Yard. In mid-1947, she was assigned to the Naval Mine Warfare Test Station, in Solomons, Maryland. On 6 January 1948, DeVoe was transferred to the Navy Nurse Corps and assigned to the Navy Communication Annex Dispensary in Washington, D. C., as the first Black nurse in the regular navy.

In March 1948, when Congress was deliberating on whether women should permanently become part of the military, Adam Clayton Powell Jr., Harlem's Representative to the House, argued that the Nurses' Corps should be permanent, and that the military should be fully desegregated. He emphasized that DeVoe was the only Black nurse serving the 19,337 Black servicemen in the Navy.

In 1949, DeVoe earned the rank of lieutenant (junior grade) and was assigned to the St. Albans Naval Hospital in the Queens borough of Long Island.

The following year, she became the first Black nurse assigned to a duty station outside the U.S. mainland, when she was sent to the Tripler Army-Navy Hospital, one of the few medical centers serving multiple service branches. Her assignment was to assist with the evacuees and injured serving in the Korean War.

On May 1, 1952, DeVoe became a full lieutenant, and in August was transferred to the naval hospital in Pasadena, California.

She was in a car accident in 1955, while serving at the Oakland Naval Hospital. On 1 April 1956, she was placed on the temporary disabilities list. She returned to duty and retired from military service in 1960 in Oakland, returning to Washington, D.C.

== Death and legacy ==
DeVoe died from lung cancer on November 17, 2000, at Cherry Lane Nursing Center in Laurel, Prince George's County, Maryland. She was buried at Quantico National Cemetery in Triangle, Virginia.
