= National Association of Colored Graduate Nurses =

Professional organization for African American nurses

The National Association of Colored Graduate Nurses (NACGN) was a professional organization for African American nurses founded in August 1908 in New York City to support and elevate African American nurses in the United States during an era of racial segregation and discrimination in healthcare. The organization aimed to improve professional standards, provide educational opportunities, and promote the inclusion of Black nurses in public and private institutions.

Over the decades, the NACGN played a critical role in advancing the status of Black nurses in the United States. It established national headquarters, organized regional networks, and published bulletins to unite and inform its members. By the mid-20th century, the organization had helped thousands of African American nurses gain access to military service, including roles in both the Army and Navy Nurse Corps during World War II. Its leadership, including figures such as Adah B. Thoms and Mabel K. Staupers, shaped the professional landscape for Black nurses and expanded opportunities in clinical and academic settings.

The NACGN's efforts contributed to the eventual integration of the American Nurses Association and the broader movement for civil rights in healthcare.

== Foundation ==
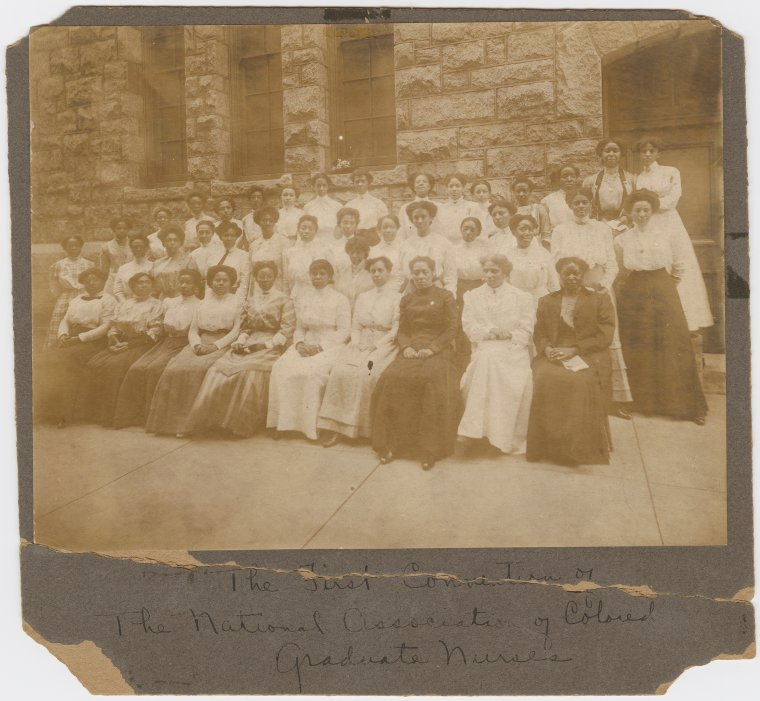
The first convention of the National Association of Colored Graduate Nurses, Boston, 1909

In the 20th century, there was prominent segregation within hospitals. A notable example of this race discrimination within healthcare was in North Carolina. Hospitals within the states allowed 110 hospital beds per 1,000 white Americans and 1 hospital bed per 1,000 African Americans. African American nurses experienced struggle in entering the healthcare field alongside the black citizens who had limited access. Before the NACGN, the AAUSC (The Antecedent to the American Nurses Association) was founded in 1897. This organization consisted of a variety of Nurses from exclusive nursing schools and worked towards improving the field of nursing. 4 African American alumni were included in this organization. The requirements for becoming a part of this alumnae association, as well other alumni associations, became increasingly less achievable for African American nurses. In 1906, Connecticut nurse Martha Minerva Franklin surveyed African American nurses to see what challenges they faced as a group. Franklin determined that the prestigious American Nurses Association was technically open to African American members, but many State Nurses Associations refused to admit black members. State-level membership was required to join the American Nurses Association and thus, many qualified African American nurses were barred from full membership in the national association.

In 1908, fifty-two nurses, including Martha Minerva Franklin and Adah Belle Thoms, met in New York City and decided to start the NACGN. The first registered black Nurse in the U.S., Charlotte Rhone, was part of the meeting that founded the NACGN. This gathering led to the establishment of a central headquarters, supported by a grant from the Rosenwald Fund and office space provided by Miss Belle Davis, Director of the National Health Circle for Colored People. Franklin was elected president at the first meeting. Rhone was then elected as national secretary of the organization at this meeting.

As they left the meeting they had three main goals: "to advance the standards and best interests of trained nurses, to break down discrimination in the nursing profession, and to develop leadership within the ranks of black nurses." To do this, the acting presidents of the NACGN not only actively fought for integration by other means but also attended the annual ANA conference to bring awareness to the topic. In 1912, the NACGN had 125 members. By 1920, that number has risen to 500. The NACGN started to expand to other states as well. In 1921, Carrie Early Broadfoot and 4 other black Nurses from North Carolina attended the 14th NACGN convention in Washington, D.C. The five that attended then went on to start the NCACGN (North Carolina Association of Colored Graduate Nurses). Their first exclusive state meeting was in 1923.

Adah Belle Thoms was the first treasurer of the NACGN before taking over the presidency of the organization in 1916. Thoms established a national jobs registry to help black nurses find employment and established the association's first headquarters. During World War I, Thoms campaigned for the American Red Cross to admit African American nurses. This was important because the American Red Cross was the only avenue into the United States Army Nurse Corps. According to Jane Delano, chair of the National Committee on Red Cross Nursing Service, the Red Cross was willing to admit black nurses, but the Surgeon General was not. Nurse Frances Reed Elliot was enrolled in the Red Cross in July 1918 but was not immediately assigned. It took the 1918 flu pandemic and the resulting nurse shortage to finally integrate the United States Army Nurse Corps. In December 1918, eighteen African American nurses were appointed to the United States Army Nurse Corps. They were assigned to Camp Grant and Camp Sherman with full rank and pay. Although the patients were not segregated and the nurses were assigned to all services, the African American nurses were housed separately from the white nurses.

Carrie E. Bullock was NACGN president from 1927 to 1930. Bullock worked to increase communication and community among black nurses. In 1928, she founded and edited the NACGN's official newsletter, The National News Bulletin.

Mabel K. Staupers became the first paid executive secretary of the NACGN in 1934. Staupers' most important accomplishment was the further integration of US military nurses. In 1946, Staupers resigned and her replacement Alma Vessels John was hired. She shepherded the organization until its dissolution in 1951.

From 1934 to 1939, Estelle Massey Osborne was NACGN's president.

== World War II ==
Initially, the War Department announced that there would be no black nurses called to serve the United States Army Nurse Corps. Staupers and other activists petitioned for the rights of black nurses and served on the NACGN Special Defense Committee. In January 1941, the Surgeon General of the Army announced a quota of fifty-six black nurses to work at the black military installations at Camp Livingston and Fort Bragg. After making this statement, the Surgeon General completely disregarded what was promised to the NACGN, black nurses being able to contribute to the war. Staupers continued to campaign for greater inclusion, meeting with Eleanor Roosevelt, white nursing groups, military leaders, and black advocates. One of the loyal, firm supporters of changing the quota was Dr. Mary Meleod Bethune. By 1943, the number of black nurses serving in the armed forces had increased from 56 to 160. By the end of the war, the War Department was drafting all qualified nurses, regardless of race. As a result of these efforts, around 400 African American nurses served in the Army Nurse Corps, with deployments in the European theatre, Burma-India theatre, and the South Pacific. Black nurses were also accepted into the Navy Nurse Corps, marking a step toward integration in military medical services.

In 1943, Congresswoman Frances P. Bolton (R-OH) introduced a bill to create government grants for nursing programs in order to increase the number of trained nurses available during World War II. The Bolton Act (1943) forbid discrimination and brought about an increase in the number of black nursing students in the country.

Professional organizations slowly began to increase membership opportunities for black women. In 1942, the National League of Nursing Education changed its by-laws to allow applicants barred from state leagues to directly join the national organization. Follow the national change, several state Leagues of Nursing Education began admitting black members. By the end of World War II there were only 2.9 percent black nurses (compared to blacks making up 10 percent of the population) or eight thousand registered black nurses in the United States.

== Integration with the American Nurses Association ==
During the civil rights movement in the late 1940s and 1950s more nursing schools were accepting black applicants. Estelle Osborne wrote in the Journal of Negro Education that in 1941, 29 United States nursing schools had a nondiscrimination policy and by 1949 that number was up to 354. In 1949, the members of the National Association of Colored Graduate Nurses unanimously voted to accept a proposed merger with the American Nurses Association. NACGN membership voted the NACGN out of existence in 1951.

== Impact and legacy ==
By its tenth anniversary in 1944, the NACGN headquarters served nearly 11,000 graduate nurses and students. With around 220 affiliated organizations, the association operated as a hub of information and support for Black nurses across the country. The National Medical Association acknowledged NACGN as a vital ally in the broader effort to improve the status and professionalism of African American medical workers.

== Notable members ==
- Carrie E. Bullock
- Frances Reed Elliot
- Martha Minerva Franklin
- Hulda Margaret Lyttle
- Mary Eliza Mahoney
- Petra Pinn
- Mabel Keaton Staupers
- Adah Belle Samuels Thoms
- Laura Holloway Yergan

== See also ==
- National Black Nurses Association
