= Sydenham Hospital =

Former hospital in New York City

Coordinates: 40°48′35.5″N 73°57′13″W

Sydenham Hospital was a healthcare facility in Harlem, Manhattan, New York, which operated between 1892 and 1980. It was located at 124th Street and Manhattan Avenue.

== History ==
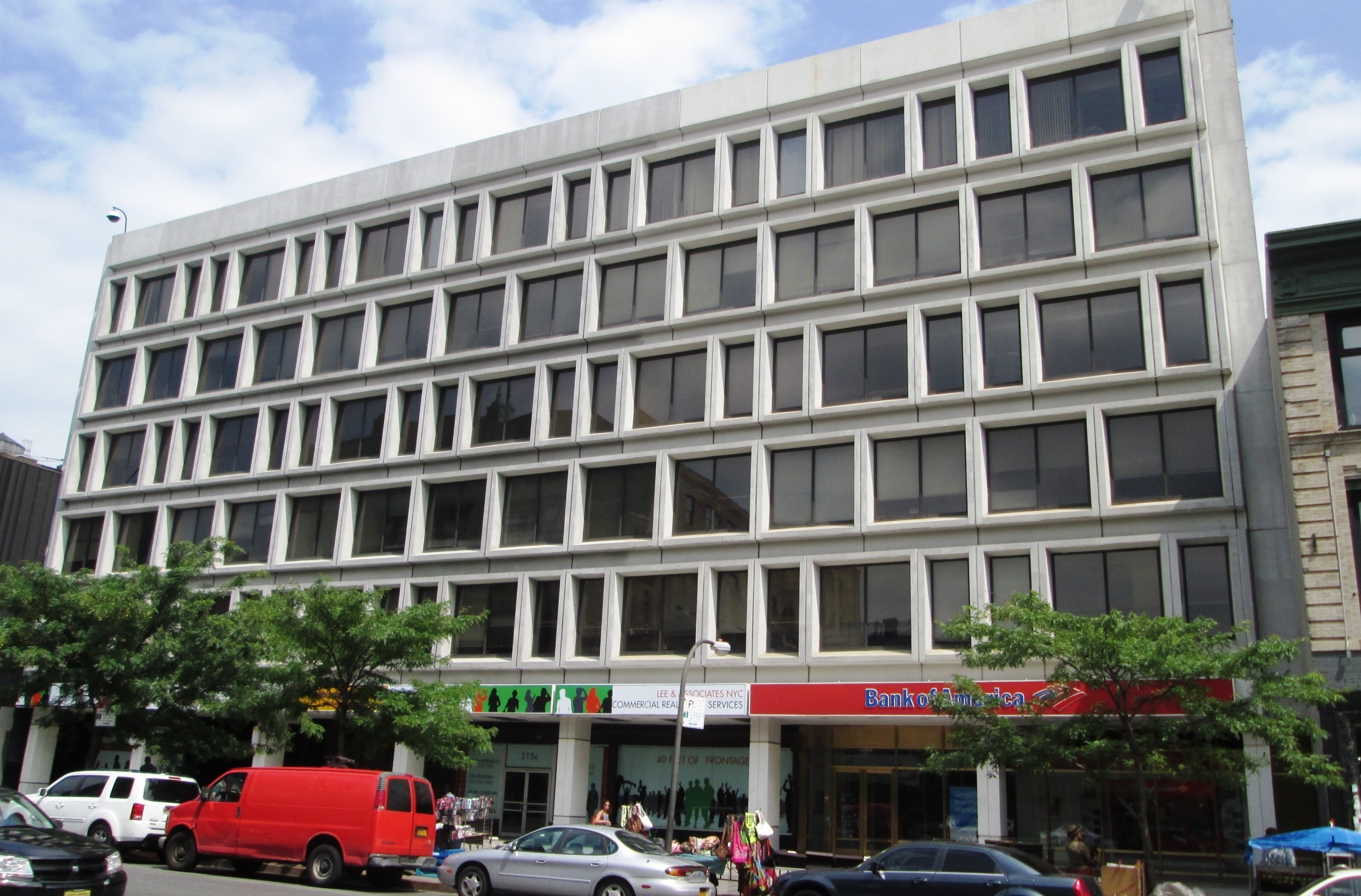
The Sydenham Hospital Clinic at 215 West 125th Street was built in 1971 as the "Commonwealth Building" and was designed by Hausman & Rosenberg.

Sydenham opened in 1892, occupying nine houses on 116th Street near 2nd Avenue as of 1911 serving mostly African American patients. Around 1924 the hospital moved to a new 200-bed building at the intersection of West 125 Street and Lenox Avenue. In 1944 the staff doctors were all white despite serving a mostly African American community. Soon after, it was the first hospital to have a full desegregated interracial policy with six African American trustees and twenty African Americans on staff. It was New York City's first full-service hospital to hire African-American doctors, and later became known for hiring African American doctors and nurses when other nearby hospitals would not.

Because of its relatively small size, Sydenham continually faced more financial problems than most private hospitals, and on March 3, 1949, control of it was taken by New York City and it became part of the municipal hospital system. However, in a new practice for the municipal hospital system, the city continued to allow Sydenham's private physicians to hospitalize their patients there. In 1971 Florence Gaynor became the first African American woman to head a major teaching hospital, taking over as executive director of Sydenham Hospital during a financial crisis.

During the severe economic troubles for New York city, the administration of Mayor Ed Koch in December 1978 formulated a tentative plan for an additional 10% reduction in funding for municipal hospitals, and closing or dramatically shrinking services at four hospitals, including Metropolitan Hospital Center in East Harlem and Sydenham. The cuts were a response to the prominent pressure that healthcare costs exerted on the municipal budget while the federal and New York state governments dithered over the escalating expense of healthcare. New York City was particularly vulnerable to healthcare costs because New York State uniquely required localities to pay 25 percent of Medicaid costs within their borders. Care to the uninsured through the city's hospital system ”accounted for more than half the budget gap for most of Koch’s mayoralty.” The administration feared that the municipal hospital system alone was "the one agency that could plunge us back into a fiscal crisis," according to Deputy Mayor Robert F. Wagner III. Sydenham was the smallest of the city's municipal hospitals with 119 beds and the most costly to operate. According to government studies, the daily cost of patient care at Sydenham was $382.40 ($1,194.40 in 2021 dollars), about $100 more per day ($312.34 in 2021 dollars) than at Bellevue Hospital, the city's flagship facility.

=== Closing ===
Koch saw the hospital closings and reorganization as steps to take control of healthcare costs and, in the bargain, deliver better services. But the hospital meant more to the community than just healthcare due to its place in history in the fight against segregation. Also, the threat of closing Sydenham came only months after the closing of Arthur C. Logan Memorial Hospital, also a Harlem institution and the only African American charitable hospital in the city. Furthermore, of the four municipal hospitals slated for closure, none were situated in predominantly white areas. However, the Civil Rights Office of the U.S. Department of Health, Education and Welfare certified the Koch reorganization plan as without discriminatory effect.

In January 1979, the Committee for Interns and Residents staged a one-day walkout of doctors at municipal hospitals to protest the cuts, and were often supported on picket lines by hospital workers from District Council 37 of AFSCME. A “Coalition to Save Sydenham” supported legal efforts to stop the closing, organized public rallies and lobbying of elected officials, and helped publicize research to demonstrate the need for the hospital. (In 1977 the federal government designated Harlem a medically underserved area, with Joseph A. Califano Jr., the United States Secretary of Health, Education and Welfare, calling it a “health disaster area".)

In the spring of 1980, as Sydenham was about to be shut down, angry demonstrators stormed the hospital, and initiated an occupation that lasted 10 days under a so-called “People’s Administration.”

On June 24, 1980, city, state and federal officials proposed a plan they said would improve healthcare in Harlem by keeping Metropolitan Hospital open with improvements and converting Sydenham to a drug, alcoholism and outpatient clinic. Community activists rejected that plan and, in November 1980, Sydenham's doors were closed for good, while Metropolitan Hospital was saved.

Although unsuccessful, the demonstrations raised the profile of Sydenham among people who had previously never heard of the hospital. Nurse and Health Activist Ebun Adelona said the closure of Sydenham became a “symbol” for Black people throughout New York to revitalize communities, improve health, and exercise political power. In 1998 Sharon Lerner asserted that “The Sydenham blunder paved the way for today's more clandestine approach to hospital downsizing, in which the city reduces its contribution to the Health and Hospitals Corporation and the agency is thereby 'forced' to make cuts to the public hospitals.”

Historians and healthcare experts have observed that the closing of historically black hospitals was an unintended consequence of the Civil Rights Act of 1964 and the enactment of Medicare in 1965. White hospitals were obliged to desegregate and Black patients followed Black physicians into previously all-white hospitals, but white patients did not cross over to historically black hospitals. The result was the decline of historically black hospitals from 124 institutions in 1944 to only 10 by 1989.

== Physicians ==
- Ethelene Crockett, M.D., Michigan's first Black woman certified in OBG, did her residency at Sydenham Hospital.
- Peter Marshall Murray
- Doris L. Wethers

== Deaths ==
- William Christopher Handy (1873–1958), bronchial pneumonia.

== See also ==
- Basil A. Paterson
