= Mary Eliza Mahoney =

African American nurse (1845-1926)

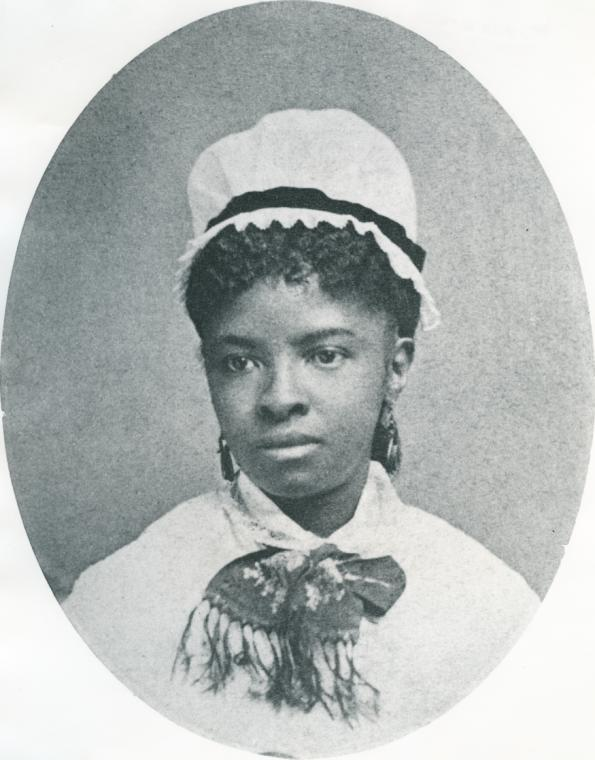
- Born: May 7, 1845^{†} Dorchester, Massachusetts, US
- Died: January 4, 1926 (aged 80); Boston, Massachusetts, US
- Education: New England Hospital for Women and Children
- Occupation: Nurse
- Known for: First African American woman to complete nurse's training in the U.S.

Mary Eliza Mahoney (May 7, 1845 – January 4, 1926) was the first African American to study and work as a professionally trained nurse in the United States. In 1879, Mahoney was the first African American to graduate from an American school of nursing.

In 1908, Martha Minerva Franklin and Adah B. Thoms, two of Mahoney's colleagues, met in New York City to found the National Association of Colored Graduate Nurses (NACGN). Mahoney, Franklin, and Thoms worked to improve access to educational and nursing practices and to raise standards of living for African American registered nurses. The NACGN played a foundational role in eliminating racial discrimination in the registered nursing profession. An increase in the acceptance of Black women into medical positions, as well as the integration of the NACGN with the American Nurses Association, prompted the dissolution of the organization in 1951.

Mahoney was inducted into the American Nurses Association Hall of Fame in 1976 and the National Women's Hall of Fame in 1993.

== Early life and education ==
Mary Eliza Mahoney was born on May 7, 1845, in Dorchester, Massachusetts, the daughter of freeborn parents, Charles Mahoney, Sr. of Maryland and Mary Jane (Stewart) Mahoney of Nova Scotia. Mahoney was the second of four children.

From an early age, Mahoney was a devout Baptist and churchgoer and attended the People's Baptist Church in Roxbury. At the age of 10, Mahoney was admitted into the Phillips School, one of the first integrated schools in Boston, where she studied from first to fourth grade. The Phillips School curriculum included teachings on values including morality and humanity alongside general subjects including English, history and mathematics. This style of instruction is believed to have influenced Mahoney's early interest in nursing. Mahoney knew from a young age that she wanted to be a nurse, possibly due to seeing immediate emergence of nurses during the American Civil War. Black women in the nineteenth century faced systemic barriers to formal training and career opportunities as licensed nurses. Nursing schools in the American South rejected applications from African American women, whereas further North, though the opportunity was still severely limited, there was greater chance at acceptance into training and graduate programs. Mahoney was admitted into a sixteen-month program at the New England Hospital for Women and Children (now the Dimock Community Health Center) in 1878 at the age of thirty-three, alongside thirty-nine other students. Her sister, Ellen Mahoney, attended the same nursing program for a time but did nor receive a degree. The criteria the hospital used in the student selection process emphasized that the forty candidates would be "well and strong, between the ages of twenty-one and thirty-one, and have a good reputation as to character and disposition". Out of a class of forty, Mahoney and two white women were the only students to complete the program and receive their degree. It is presumed that the administration accepted Mahoney, despite not meeting the age criteria, because of her connections to the hospital through prior work as a cook, maid, and washerwoman there when she was eighteen. Mahoney worked nearly sixteen hours daily for the fifteen years that she worked as a hospital laborer.

Mahoney's training required that she spend at least one year in the hospital's various wards to gain universal nursing knowledge. The intensive program consisted of long days with a 5:30 AM to 9:30 PM shift, which required Mahoney to attend lectures and lessons and to educate herself through instruction of doctors in the ward. These lectures consisted of nursing in families, physiological subjects, food for the sick, surgical nursing, child-bed nursing, disinfectants, and general nursing. Outside the lectures, students were taught bedside procedures, such as taking vital signs and bandaging. In addition, Mahoney worked for several months as a private-duty nurse. The nursing program allowed students to earn a weekly wage, ranging from 1 to 4 dollars, after their first two weeks of work. For many of the nurses these wages were insufficient, as they struggling financially and giving back 25% of their wages for financial assistance to the hospital. Three quarters of the program consisted of the nurses working within a surgical, maternity or medical ward with six patients they were responsible caring for. The last two months of the extensive 16-month long program required the nurses to use their newfound knowledge and skills in environments they were not accustomed to; such as hospitals or private family homes. After completing these requirements, Mahoney graduated in 1879 as a registered nurse alongside two colleagues — the first Black person to do so in the United States. Mahoney was the first Black person to register with the Nurses Directory at the Massachusetts Medical Library.

Mahoney’s guiding motto was "Work more and better the coming year than the previous year."

== Career ==
After receiving her nursing diploma, Mahoney worked for many years as a private care nurse, earning a distinguished reputation. She worked for predominantly white, wealthy families. The majority of her work was with new mothers and newborns, in New Jersey, with occasional travel to other states. During the early years of her employment, African American nurses were often treated as household servants rather than professionals. Mahoney emphasized her preference to eating dinner alone in the kitchen, distancing herself from eating with household help, to further distinguish the relation between the professions. Mahoney also lived alone in an apartment in Roxbury where she spent time reading and relaxing, while also attending church activities with her sister. Families who employed Mahoney praised her efficiency in her nursing profession. In an article in the American Journal of Nursing in 1954, one patient was quoted as saying, "I owe my life to that dear soul." Mahoney's professionalism helped raise the status and standards of all nurses, especially minorities. Mahoney was also known for her skills and preparedness. As Mahoney's reputation quickly spread, she received private-duty nursing requests from patients in states in the north and south east coast.

Of the many goals that Mahoney had, one was to change the way patients and families thought of minority nurses. Mahoney wanted to abolish any discrimination in the nursing field. Being an African American woman in a predominantly white society, she often experienced discrimination. In Massachusetts particularly, it was difficult for African American nurses to find work following graduation, due to the limitations of either working in African American homes or working in white homes that already had African American employees in household work. She believed that all people should have the opportunity to pursue their dreams without racial discrimination. It is said that Frederick Douglass, a prominent African American abolitionist and formerly enslaved person of the time, was distantly related to Mahoney, which became one of the influences in her active participation against the repercussions of slavery and racial discrimination against minorities in the United States.

In 1896, Mahoney became one of the original members of the then-predominantly white Nurses Associated Alumnae of the United States and Canada (NAAUSC), which later became the American Nurses Association (ANA). In the early 1900s, the NAAUSC did not welcome African American nurses into their association. In response, Mahoney co-founded a new, more welcoming nurse's association, with help of Martha Minerva Franklin and Adah B. Thoms. In 1908, she became co-founder of the National Association of Colored Graduate Nurses (NACGN). This association did not discriminate against anyone and aimed to support and congratulate the accomplishments of all outstanding nurses, and to eliminate racial discrimination in the nursing community. The association also strived to commemorate minority nurses on their accomplishments in the registered nursing field. In 1909, Mahoney spoke at the NACGN's first annual convention, which became the first time that Martha Minerva Franklin and Adah Belle Thoms met Mahoney in person. The NACGN struggled in their early stages with only 26 nurses in attendance of their first national convention. In her speech, she recognized the inequalities in her nursing education, and in nursing education of the day. The NACGN members gave Mahoney a lifetime membership in the association and a position as the organization's chaplain.

From 1911 to 1912, Mahoney served as director of the Howard Colored Orphan Asylum for Black children in Weeksville, Brooklyn. The asylum served as a home for freed colored children and the colored elderly. This institution was run by African Americans. Here, Mary Eliza Mahoney finished her career, helping people and using her knowledge however she knew best.

In 1954, a former Professor of Nursing at Teachers College at Columbia University, Mary Ella Chayer, wrote of Mahoney:

This nurse was an outstanding student of her time, an expert and tender practitioner, an exemplary citizen, and an untiring worker in both local and national organizations. She was a sound builder for the future, a builder of foundations on which others to follow may safely depend.

== Later life and death ==
In retirement, Mahoney was still concerned with women's equality and a strong supporter of women's suffrage. She actively participated in the advancement of civil rights in the United States. In 1920, after women's suffrage was achieved in the U.S., Mahoney was among the first women in Boston to register to vote, at age 76.

In 1923, Mahoney was diagnosed with breast cancer and battled the illness for 3 years until she died on January 4, 1926, at the age of 80 at New England Hospital for Women and Children, where she had trained. Her grave is located in Woodlawn Cemetery in Everett, Massachusetts. In 1968 Helen Sullivan Miller, a recipient of the Mary E. Mahoney Medal, spearheaded a drive to establish a proper monument, with the support of the American Nurses Association and Chi Eta Phi, an American sorority for registered professional nurses and student nurses. Mabel Staupers, another Mahoney Medal recipient, designed the stone.

== Awards and honors ==
In recognition of her outstanding example to nurses of all races, the NACGN established the Mary Mahoney Award in 1936. When NACGN merged with the American Nurses Association in 1951, the award was continued. Today, the Mary Mahoney Award is bestowed biennially by the ANA in recognition of significant contributions in advancing equal opportunities in nursing for members of minority groups.

Mahoney was inducted into the American Nurses Association Hall of Fame in 1976. She was inducted into the National Women's Hall of Fame in 1993.

Other honors include:

- Mary Mahoney Memorial Health Center, Oklahoma City
- Mary Mahoney Lecture Series, Indiana University Northwest
- Honoring Mary Eliza Mahoney, America's first professionally trained African American nurse. House of Representatives resolution, US Congress, April 2006 H.CON.RES.386
- The Mary Eliza Mahoney Dialysis Center is a stop on the Boston Women's Heritage Trail.

== Notes ==
According to Mary E. Chayer of Teacher's College, Columbia University, an unverified report gave Mary Eliza Mahoney's birth date as April 16, 1845 in Roxbury. Other sources list her date of birth as May 7, 1845.
