= Frances Reed Elliott =

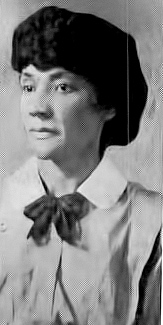
- Frances Reed Elliott Crisis Magazine 1918
- Born: 1892; Shelby, North Carolina, U.S.
- Died: 1965 (aged 72–73)
- Education: Knoxville College; Freedman's Hospital Training School for Nurses
- Known for: African American Red Cross Nurse

Frances Reed Elliott (1892–1965) was the first African American woman accepted into the American Red Cross Nursing Service. She earned this recognition on July 2, 1918.

== Early life ==
Elliott was born in Shelby, North Carolina into an illegal interracial marriage of an African-American Cherokee share cropper and the daughter of the plantation owner. Tragedy struck and her father had to flee. By the age of five both of her parents were dead. In the foster care system, her education was sporadic at best, but she honed her own reading and writing skills despite having no teacher.

== Education and early career ==
Elliott graduated Knoxville College at the age of 25 and took a teaching career to pay for further education. But Elliott longed "to be a nurse and help little children." Elliott entered the Freedman's Hospital Training School for Nurses in Washington, D.C. in 1910. The final exams in 1913 were given to students based on race; the exam for the white nurses was considered the hardest and most highly esteemed. Elliott demanded that she take the exam with the white students and became the first African-American to D.C. to pass the exam.

Her first job was as a private-duty nurse. Later, she worked at Provident Hospital in Baltimore, Maryland, and completed additional courses at Columbia University.

== American Red Cross ==
Though she had been initially refused to the Red Cross on the basis of race she persevered and was accepted in 1918 as the first African American in the Red Cross Nursing Service.

However, this was hardly the end of the discrimination faced by Elliott. When World War I came she signed up for and was refused by the Army Nurse Corps. Her white colleagues were all automatically rewarded Red Cross pins that allowed them to transfer to the Corps and help with the war effort. Elliott's pin arrived late and displayed "1A" designating her as the first African-American nurse and thus unable to join. The A system stayed in effect until 1949. Elliott refused to be defeated and contributed to the war effort through nursing soldiers in Tennessee, but was never able to go overseas.

Frances Reed Elliott had numerous contributions to the Red Cross, serving as the director of nurses training in Tuskegee, Alabama, and organizing the first training school for African-American nurses in Michigan. She managed prenatal, maternal and child health clinics in Detroit and ran a commissary at the Ford Motor plant during the depression to provide workers with food. She also established a nursery in Michigan that was so successful she caught the attention of Eleanor Roosevelt who raised funds for the center.

== Death ==
Scheduled to be honored by the Red Cross for her service to others throughout her lifetime, Elliott died nine days before her ceremony in 1965. Elliott was buried at Rosehill Cemetery, Eaton Rapids, Eaton County, Michigan.
