= Martha Minerva Franklin =

African-American nurse

Martha Minerva Franklin

Martha Minerva Franklin (October 29, 1870 – September 26, 1968) was an African-American nurse, one of the first people to campaign for racial equality in nursing.

== Early life ==
Franklin was born in New Milford, Connecticut, to Mary E. Gauson and Henry J. Franklin. She had a sister, Florence, and a brother, William. Her father had been a soldier in the Union Army during the Civil War. Franklin graduated from Meriden Public High School in 1890 as one of few African American members of her class. In 1895, she moved to Philadelphia to attend the Women's Hospital Training School for Nurses. She graduated in December 1897 and as the only African American member of her graduating class.

After graduation, Franklin returned to Meriden and began doing in-home private duty nursing. In the early 1900s, Franklin moved to New Haven and became involved in the city's black social organizations.

== Nursing activism ==
In the fall of 1906, Franklin began to study the status of black nurses. She mailed more than 500 letters to black nurses, superintendents of nursing schools, and nursing organizations in order to gain a wider perspective on the experiences of African American nurses. Franklin determined that the prestigious American Nurses Association was technically open to African American members, but many State Nurses Associations refused to admit black members. State-level membership was required to join the American Nurses Association and thus, many qualified African American nurses were barred from full membership in the national association.

Franklin sent 1,500 letters to black nurses, suggesting a national meeting. Adah Belle Samuel Thoms hosted the meeting at the Lincoln Hospital and Home in New York City. Fifty-two nurses attended this first meeting to form the National Association of Colored Graduate Nurses (NACGN) and Franklin was elected president. Three goals were set out in the initial meeting of the NACGN: improve training for black nurses, reduce racial inequality in the nursing profession, and cultivate leaders from within the black nursing community.

The NACGN received early support from the National Medical Association, a black physicians' group. The NACGN was invited to hold their meetings in tandem with the National Medical Association and articles written by nurses were published in the National Medical Association's journal.

In 1951, the NACGN merged with the American Nurses Association.

== Career ==
Franklin moved to New York City in 1928 and graduated from a six-month postgraduate course at Lincoln Hospital. Through this course, Franklin became a registered nurse and began working as a public school nurse. Between 1928 and 1930, Franklin studied public health nursing at Teachers College, Columbia University, but did not complete a degree.

== Later life and death ==
Franklin retired and moved to New Haven. She died at the age of 98 in 1968. She is buried in Walnut Grove Cemetery.

== Posthumous honors ==
In 1976, Franklin was inducted into the ANA's Nursing Hall of Fame.

In 2009, she was inducted into the Connecticut Women's Hall of Fame.
