= Mabel K. Staupers =

American nurse and activist

Mabel Keaton Staupers
- Born: Mabel Elouise Doyle; February 27, 1890; Barbados
- Died: September 30, 1989 (aged 99); Washington, DC, United States
- Education: Freedmen's Hospital School of Nursing
- Known for: Nursing administration at Booker T. Washington Sanatorium, advancing the status of African American nurses
- Spouses: James Max Keaton (m. 1917, divorced) Fritz C. Staubers (m. 1931; died 1949)
- Awards: Spingarn Medal 1951; American Nurses Association Hall of Fame 1996
- Scientific career
- Fields: Nursing

Mabel Keaton Staupers (February 27, 1890 – September 30, 1989) was a Barbadian born American pioneer of the nursing profession. Being faced with racial discrimination after graduating nursing school, Staupers became an advocate for racial equality in nursing in the United States. She is best known for her leadership in the National Association of Colored Graduate Nurses (NACGN) and for helping end the racial restrictions against black nurses in the United States military during World War II.

Staupers also did work in public health, caring for African American tuberculosis patients in Harlem. In 1961, she published a book on the integration of African American nurses in the United States.

== Early life and education ==
Staupers was born February 27, 1890, in Barbados, West Indies. In 1903, at the age of thirteen, she emigrated to the United States, Harlem, New York, with her parents, Pauline and Thomas Doyle and received American citizenship in 1917. She began attending Freedmen's Hospital School of Nursing in Washington, DC, in 1914, where she graduated with honors in 1917. After graduation, like most graduate nurses, she worked as a private duty nurse.

== Early career and public health ==
While working as a private nurse in Washington, DC and New York, Staupers helped establish the Booker T. Washington Sanatorium, in 1920. It was the first inpatient center of its kind in Harlem and was founded to care for African Americans with tuberculosis, at a time when other hospitals refused Black medical experts privileges or staffing positions. Staupers became superintendent for the Booker T. Washington Sanatorium from 1920 to 1921. In 1921, Staupers was granted a fellowship at the Henry Phipps Institute in Philadelphia. In the same year following her fellowship, 1922, she was asked to conduct a survey of the needs of the Harlem community related to health. She used her influence and management skills and became executive secretary of the Harlem Committee of the New York Tuberculosis and Health Association, a position she held for twelve years.

== Involvement in the National Association of Colored Graduate Nurses ==
During the year 1934, Staupers became the executive secretary of the National Association of Colored Graduate Nurses (NACGN), and the main goal of the association was to advance the status of African American nurses, most of whom were barred from nursing schools and professional associations in a number of states.

In December 1935, Staupers attended a gathering of African American women leaders, organized by Mary McLeod Bethune to establish the National Council of Negro Women. In 1938, Staupers helped organize a national biracial advisory committee to spread awareness about the goals of the NACGN. In 1946, Staupers decided to step down from her position as executive secretary after 12 years in this position. In 1948, the hard work of the NACGN had finally opened the American Nurses Association (ANA) to the membership of Black nurses. In 1949, she became president of the NACGN, and together the members voted to disassemble the association as they had completed their goals. Staupers, along with the president of NACGN, Estelle Masse Riddle (Osborne), led the struggle of Black nurses to win full integration into the American nursing profession. Staupers was a great organizer and an astute political tactician whose focus was social change.

== World War II advocacy for integration ==
The major social change led by Staupers and something she is known for today, is playing a crucial role in the desegregation of the military's nursing corps during World War II. During World War II Staupers fought for the inclusion of Black nurses in the Army and Navy as the executive secretary of the National Association of Colored Graduate Nurses (NACGN). She wrote that "Negro nurses recognize that service to their country is a responsibility of citizenship."

At the time, the Army had a strict 56 Black nurse quota to enter the service, and the Navy did not permit any Black nurses, and it enforced segregated practices for those who were already in the service. This upset Staupers because she knew Black nurses could help with the shortage of nurses in the military. She sent many letters to state officials and even first lady Eleanor Roosevelt. Someone who was friends to the both of them, Anna Arnold Hedgeman, eventually set them up to meet by encouraging Roosevelt to meet with Staupers. In 1944, Staupers met with Eleanor Roosevelt in her Washington Square apartment in New York City to discuss what Staupers had to say about the military not allowing Black nurses into their ranks. This meeting led to suggestions by Mrs. Roosevelt to high ranking officials within the military for the inclusion of Black nurses.

In early 1945, Staupers attacked the hypocrisy of Surgeon General Norman T. Kirk's plan to draft white women as nurses instead of admitting qualified Black nurses to meet the shortage of nurses in the military. Staupers publicly challenged Surgeon General Norman T. Kirk at the Hotel Pierre in New York City while he was addressing a large crowd. She stood up as he was speaking and questioned him, asking him why colored nurses are not accepted into the military if there is such a large nurse shortage. The story of this encounter made national headlines predominantly in Black newspapers.

On January 9, 1945, the announcement of the Draft Nurse Bill caused a mass public outrage across the country. Staupers took advantage of this and began reaching out to all kinds of groups across the country, including women's advocacy groups, fellow Black nurses, as well as the National Nursing Council for War Service (NNCWS), to support the integration of Black nurses into the military by sending telegrams to President Roosevelt. She also teamed up with the executive secretary of the NNCWS, Elmira Wickenden, to make a statement advocating for the positive impact integration of Black nurses would have on the military. After the mass amounts of telegrams sent to the White House their hard work had finally paid off. On January 20, 1945, Surgeon General Norman T. Kirk announced that the Army Nurses Corps had been opened to all applicants regardless of race. This accomplishment was another reason for the NACGN to disassemble, as they felt their goals, for the most part, had been met.

== Awards and accolades ==
In 1947, the NACGN awarded Staupers with the Mary Mahoney Medal for her exemplary service in the nursing profession.

In 1951, the NAACP honored Staupers with the Spingarn Medal in recognition of her efforts on behalf of Black women workers.

In 1967, the Mayor of New York at the time, John Lindsay, granted Staupers a citation of appreciation for her work as a leader and for being a model citizen.

In 1970, her alma mater, Howard University (formally known as Freedmans Hospital), awarded her the Alumni Award for her outstanding efforts in nursing and community service.

On June 15, 1996, 7 years after her death, she was inducted into the ANA Hall of Fame, the award was accepted by her sister Dr. Dorothy Harrison.

== Publications ==
In 1961, Staupers published a book titled, No Time for Prejudice: A Story of the Integration of Negroes in Nursing in the United States. This book illustrated the story of struggles and triumphs and the endeavors of Staupers and others to desegregate the profession of nursing in the United States.

== Personal life ==
In 1917, the same year she graduated from nursing school, Staupers married Dr. James Max Keaton. A divorce ended this marriage. In 1931, she remarried to a man named Fritz C. Staupers, who, like Mabel, was a Barbadian American. He later died after 18 years of marriage in 1949.

After retirement, Staupers moved to Washington DC, with her sister Dr. Dorothy Harrison. Where she spent the rest of her time until her death. Staupers died on September 30, 1989, aged 99.
