= Airline meal =

Meals served to airliner passengers

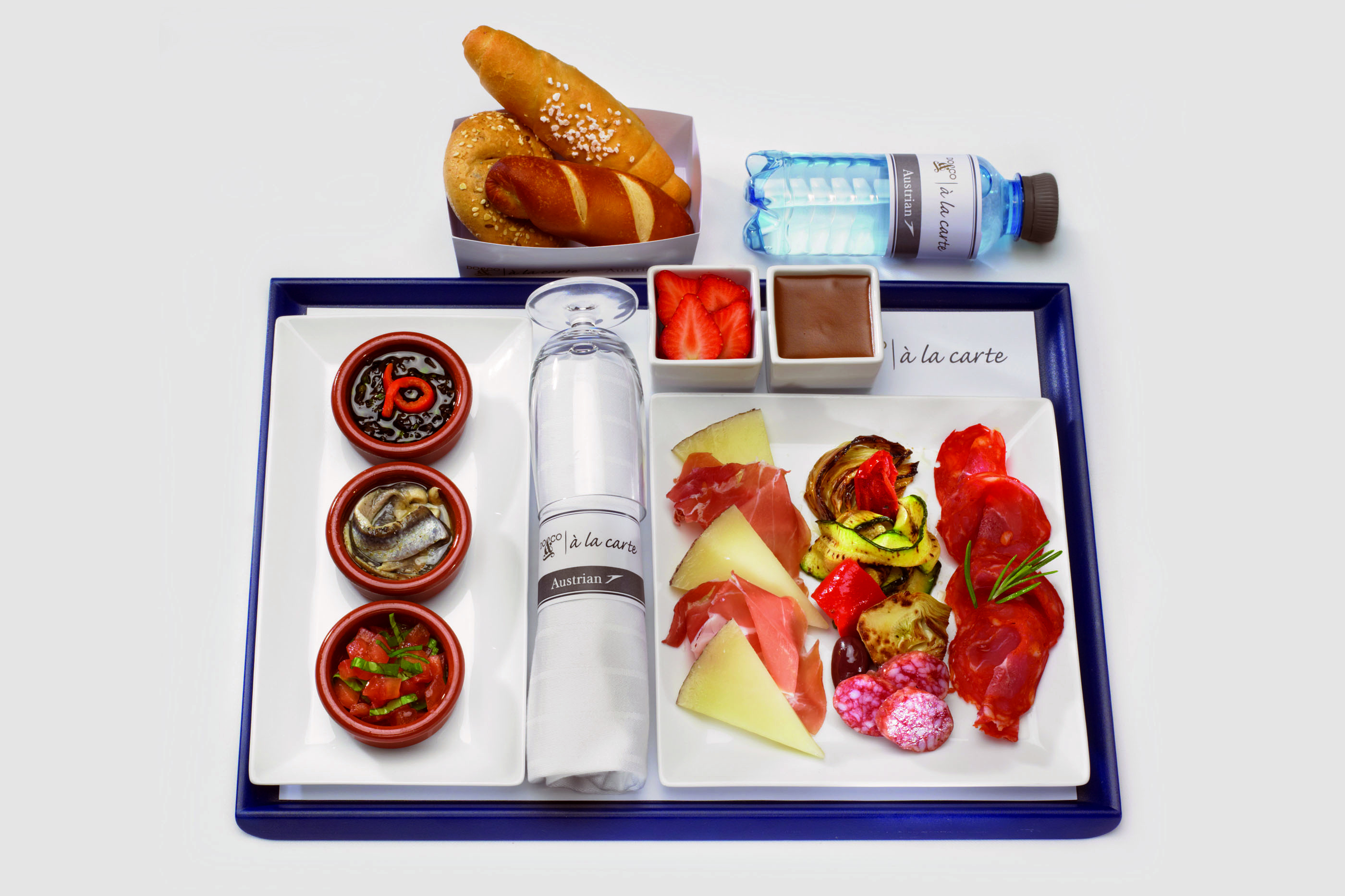
A Do & Co à la carte meal as served aboard Austrian Airlines flights

An airline meal, airline food, or in-flight meal is a meal served to passengers on board a commercial airliner. These meals are prepared by specialist airline catering services and are normally served to passengers using an airline service trolley.

These meals vary widely in quality and quantity across different airline companies and classes of travel. They range from a simple snack or beverage in short-haul economy class to a seven-course gourmet meal in a first class long-haul flight. The types of food offered also vary widely from country to country, and often incorporate elements of local cuisine, sometimes both from the origin and destination countries. When ticket prices were regulated in the American domestic market, food was the primary means by which airlines differentiated themselves.

== History ==
=== 1920s: Unheated meals in the early days ===
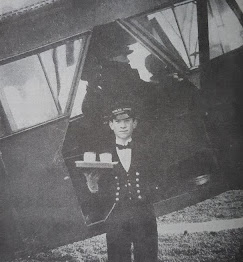
Daimler Airways' first attendant, Jack Sanderson, serving juice to passengers boarding a De Havilland

Daimler Airway pioneered the service of light refreshments. Their flight attendant, also known as the cabin boy, would procure food from the local markets before preparing and serving them in lunch boxes. Planes would often have to land at destinations even where no passengers were boarding or disembarking, just so that passengers could have their meals while the plane was being refuelled. At this early stage of aircraft meal service, the only heated refreshments were coffee and tea.

The first airline meals were served by Handley Page Transport, an airline company founded in 1919, to serve the London–Paris route in October of that year. Passengers could choose from a selection of sandwiches and fruit. In-flight menus were not often changed, as the low frequency of air travel meant that passengers would be less likely to notice the similarity of food served.

Only chewing gum was served on the inaugural Pan Am flight in 1929, in order to prevent airsickness. Flights in this era of air travel were extremely noisy and uncomfortable, with passengers often anxious about flying for the first time.

In the late 1920s, Western Air Express was one of the first airlines to serve in-flight meals in the United States, beginning with flights between Los Angeles and San Francisco. Food served included fried chicken, cake, fruits and sandwiches. Mealtimes served as a distraction from the unpleasant flight experience and helped ease nerves.

=== 1930s: Romanticising in-flight dining ===
Dining areas got increasingly spacious, providing passengers with the freedom to move around and mingle while having their meals and for that reason, the 1930s were described as the "most romantic" era of air travel. Aircraft lounges were elaborately designed, accompanied with posh chinaware and white tablecloths.

United Airlines set up the first dedicated in-flight catering kitchen. Based in Oakland, California, this initiative provided passengers with a choice of either scrambled eggs or fried chicken as the main course. At the same time, improvements in flight technologies and aircraft capabilities posed a new set of problems for meal service. Flying at higher altitudes meant that eggs took a longer time to cook, and bread would spoil much faster.

Pan Am is known to be the first airline to heat food in-flight, on board a Sikorsky S-42. The delivery of bigger aircraft like the Boeing 247s and Douglas DC-3s meant more space for hot stoves and fridges to be fitted on board. Such an upgrade of the flight experience was a way to differentiate themselves from competitors.

=== 1940s: Rise of the pre-packed meal ===
New aircraft built after the end of World War II were more advanced than those of the early 1940s, but food heating and service technology had not quite caught up. However, passengers came to expect food to be served on almost every flight, even on ultra short-haul ones between nearby cities. One Eastern Airline flight crew recalled having to serve sandwiches and drinks within the twenty-minute flight between Washington DC to Richmond, Virginia.

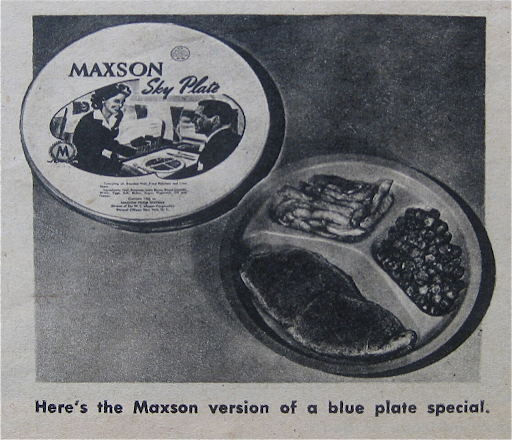
William Maxson's brainchild, the Sky Plate, could be frozen and then heated up mid-flight.

WWII US Navy veteran and founder of the W. L. Maxson Corporation William Maxson introduced the idea of heating up frozen food in-flight, parallel to the post-war surge in the development of refrigerators. His famous 'sky plate' was first meant as an option for naval troops to have hot meals, but soon found its way into Pan Am as a legitimate way of serving pre-made food. Pan-Am started serving pre-made frozen meals, which in turn inspired the TV dinners sold in American supermarkets, and these are still offered today in modern-day commercial flights for economy class. The service of frozen food was well-received and encouraged by airline management, since it greatly reduced food waste when flights were cancelled.

In 1946, the number of flyers increased to the point where flight attendants had to serve twice the number of passengers in two-thirds the amount of time. There was increasing pressure to serve food fast during meal service as flight times gradually became shorter. Passengers were expected to consume their meals quickly, especially when tray tables had to be stowed for landing.

=== 1950s: Class differentiation and the flight attendant as familiar icon ===
The cabin galley began to develop, and passengers came to expect their meals to be served from the back of the aircraft. Newer jetliners had at least three galleys, with at least one serving each travel class. Airlines would sometimes offer special menus on special occasions. For example, when the British royal family came to Australia in 1954, Qantas passengers were served fish topped with hollandaise sauce and lamb cutlets paired with potatoes.

In 1958, the International Air Transport Association (IATA) officially recognised economy as a distinct travel class. This gave rise to what is known as the 'sandwich war', where IATA issued an agreement with airlines that they were only allowed to serve simple and low-cost food in economy class. European and North American airlines interpreted this ruling differently, the latter serving conventional sandwiches, while the former group of airlines offered more elaborate open faced sandwiches, featuring expensive ingredients like asparagus and ox tongue. After rounds of meetings and negotiations, IATA ruled that sandwiches should not be overly elaborate and should look more like what airlines in the US serve. Eventually, airlines did begin serving higher-quality food to economy class passengers due to increased competition.

The 1950s was also a decade where the female flight attendant began to be seen as an icon of air travel, particularly through the imagery of flight attendants as 'waitresses in the air'. Japan Airlines (JAL) would serve American dishes such as roast chicken and pineapple salad, alongside a few 'exotic' Japanese foods on board their Tokyo-San Francisco route. The decision to serve American style meals was made by JAL's upper management in order to cater to the tastes of foreign passengers.

=== 1960s: Rapid industrialisation ===
As jets began to fly at higher altitudes, in-flight meal caterers faced the problem of decreased taste bud sensitivity amongst passengers. The low humidity in cabins would affect passengers' sense of smell, thus affecting ability to taste. Thus, menus with stronger tasting food and beverages had to be devised and served. Cheaper wines were found to be tastier than more expensive varieties when consumed at cruising altitude.

Cathay Pacific was one of the first international airlines to pivot from solely serving traditional cuisines, which were long seen as comfort food for the stress and unfamiliarity of travel. The airline had shark fin soup, kangaroo tail soup and even flaming baked Alaska on its menu. Aviation observers note that Cathay might have had the liberty to make this decision due to its non-membership in the IATA. Regardless, the Hong Kong carrier has since stopped serving and shipping shark fin on board their flights.

In 1969, the Boeing 747 jetliner was introduced to commercial aviation. 362 passengers were serviced by a total of six galleys. Rolling carts also made their maiden appearance— and although these carts were first thought to increase the efficiency of meal service, the increased number of passengers meant that there was no significant decrease in meal service times.

Rapid industrialisation also forced airlines to come up with strategies to serve the greatest number of passengers in the shortest possible time. Economy classes across the board switched from glassware to plastic to minimise the need for washing and cleaning, while smaller, bite-size food like sandwiches were frequently served so that passengers would finish their meals quicker.

=== 1970s: Budget offerings, celebrity chefs and transnational foodways ===
In the 1970s, business class started to be seen as a travel class of its own, with airlines often adopting unique sets of cutlery and plating services to distinguish it from economy class. At the same time, budget airlines began to increase in popularity as a low-cost travel option. Meals were usually not served unless pre-ordered and paid for, although packets of peanuts would usually be distributed to passengers. Southwest Airlines started this practice of serving peanuts mid-flight, although the budget carrier removed this option in 2018, after concerns over peanuts being an allergen surfaced.

Air France and British Airways were well known for their lavish first class offerings, with caviar, foie gras and champagnes being the norm to be served. Both airlines operated the Concorde supersonic airliner where passengers received menus created by celebrity chefs (who even occasionally prepared food in-flight) with 3-6 courses including lobster and truffles served upon Damask table linen with Wedgewood and/or Royal Dalton china, paired with a wine selection from the airline's 12,000-bottle wine cellar. Thanks to the near-lack of turbulence at the heights that Concorde operated, “flight attendants could balance trays with 15 glasses and walk along the 16-inch-wide aisle without a ripple”. The meal service upon Concorde along with the faster trip justified the high ticket prices (a round trip was $1,500 in 1976 and $12,000 in 2003) as well as offsetting the tight legroom and limited permitted luggage that passengers were afforded on Concorde.

The spread of transitional trade enabled in-flight caterers to streamline their food production facilities. Ingredients from different parts of the world would be flown into a centralised kitchen for cooking and packing, then transported to another city and loaded on board an outbound flight. Pan Am was one such airline, with kitchens in resource-rich cities like New York, San Francisco, and Tokyo.

In 1973, French airline Union de Transports Aériens became the first air carrier to engage a chef to improve their in-flight menu. French chef Raymond Oliver was tasked by the airline to overhaul their menus in light of the altered taste buds at high altitudes. Oliver increased the amount of salt, sugar and oil used in their recipes, resulting in an almost immediate improvement in taste.

=== 1980s–present: Ongoing security and cost issues ===
High air travel demand has meant that airlines have been forced to find new ways to cut costs. In 1987, Robert L. Crandall, the president and chairman of American Airlines reportedly saved the company up to $40,000 a year just by removing a single olive from their first class meals.

In 2006, a plot to set off explosives on board ten transatlantic flights using homemade explosives was uncovered. This led to liquids measuring more than 100 mL being banned from all flights, forcing passengers to purchase pricier beverages at the airport and on board the aircraft.

In 2016, British Airways scrapped the service of the second meal in premium economy and economy class for all short-haul flights. Passengers had to make do with snacks or purchase an extra meal should they get hungry.

International airlines have been working with celebrity or Michelin-star chefs to further elevate the mid-air dining experience. Examples include American Airlines' partnership with restaurateur and judge on the Food Network cooking game show Chopped Maneet Chauhanon their first and business class menus, and Singapore Airlines' Book the Cook, where passengers flying in the premium classes have the option to choose their meals from selections created by the airline's panel of chefs.

The COVID-19 pandemic saw in-flight dining become an experience of nostalgia, as people bought set meals to dine on the ground. In 2020, Singapore Airlines hosted diners on their grounded A380s, as part of the "Discover Your Singapore Airlines: Restaurant A380 @ Changi" experience. Tickets sold out within 30 minutes of its launch. Since 1 July 2023, there is a vending machine at Shonai Airport that offers microwavable frozen dishes served on All Nippon Airways Co. (ANA)'s international routes, with locals buying eighty percent of these meals.

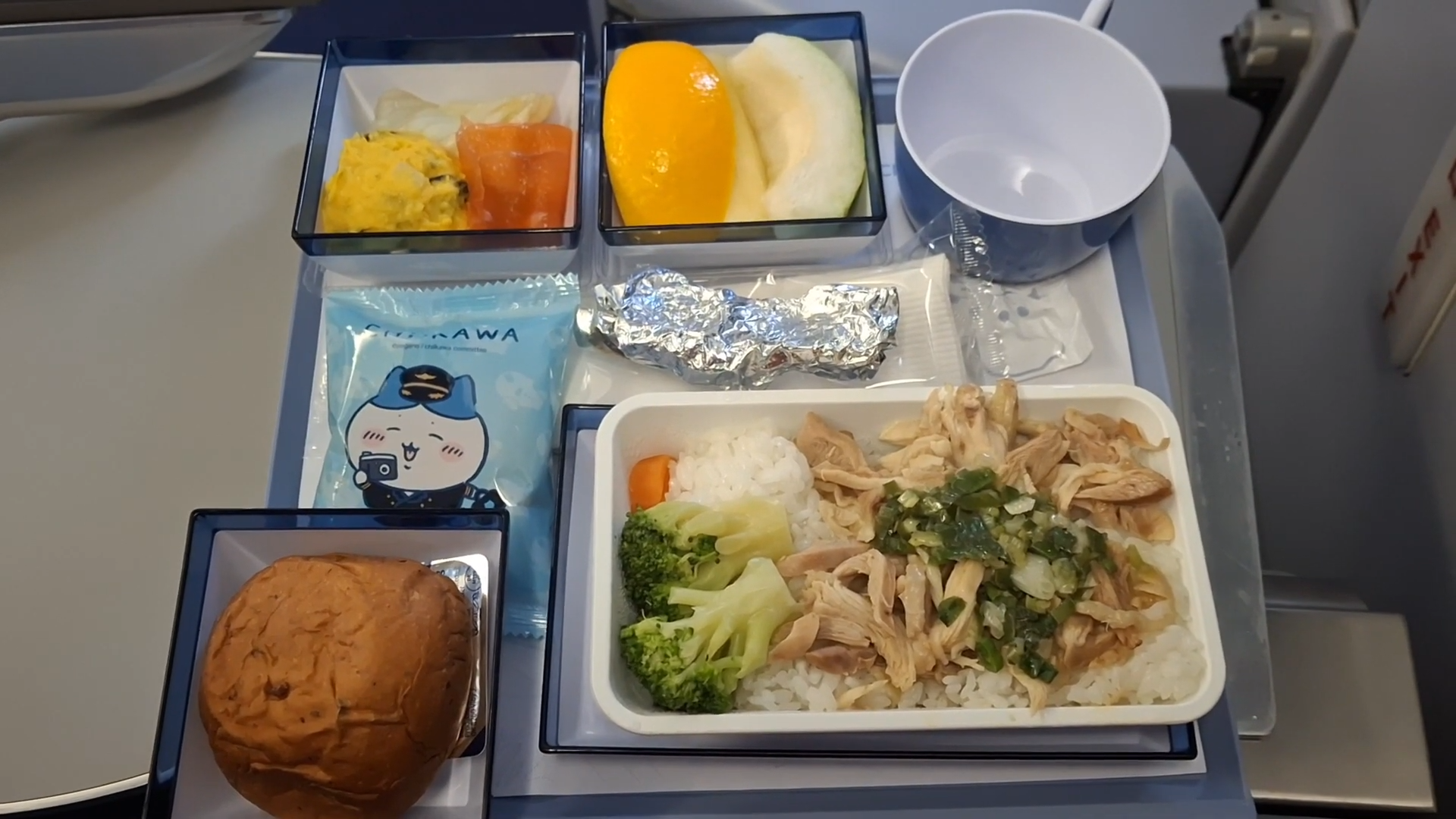
A meal served on a short-haul China Airlines flight

== Contents ==
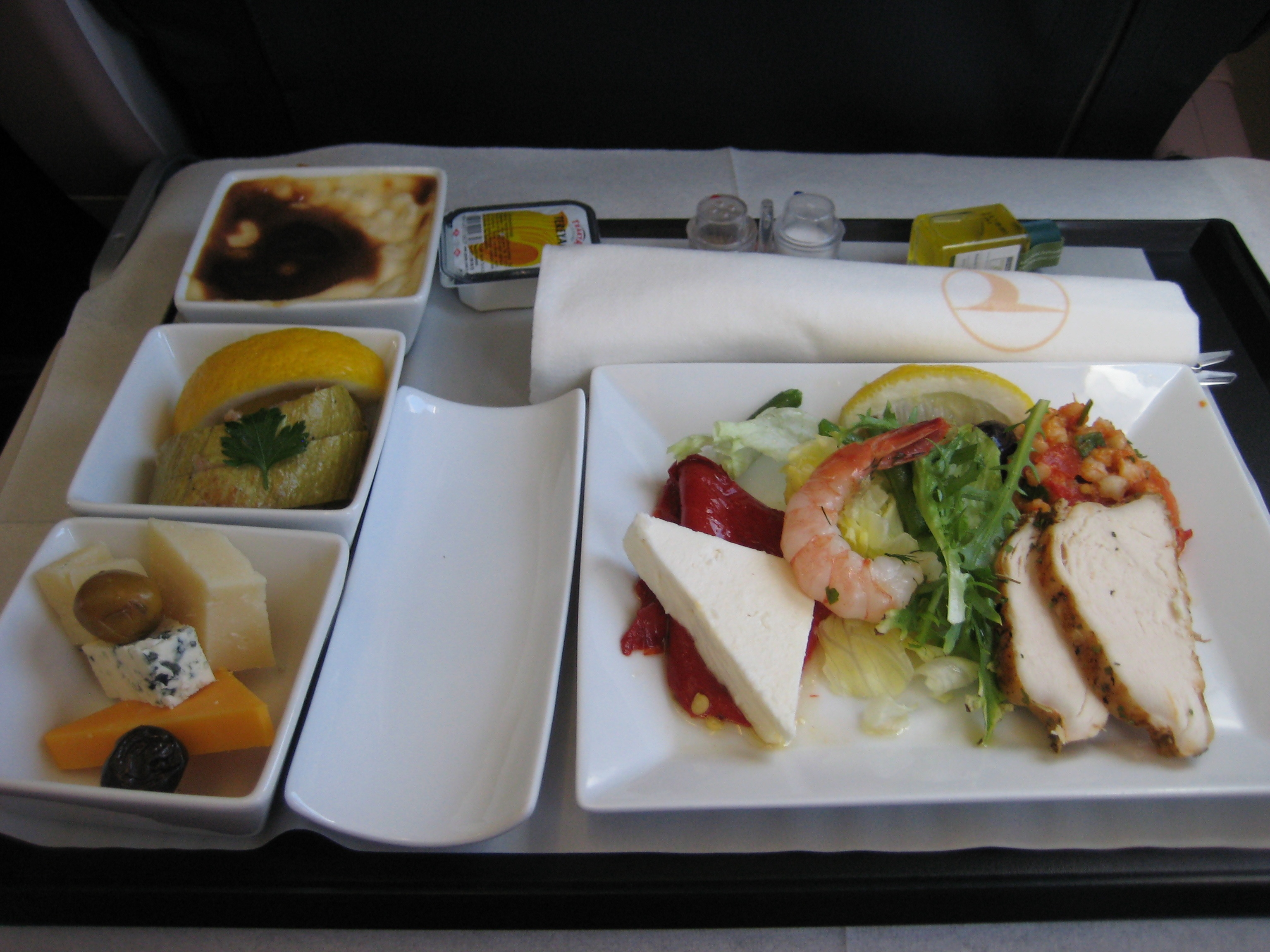
Turkish Airlines Business class meal on an Istanbul to Cairo flight

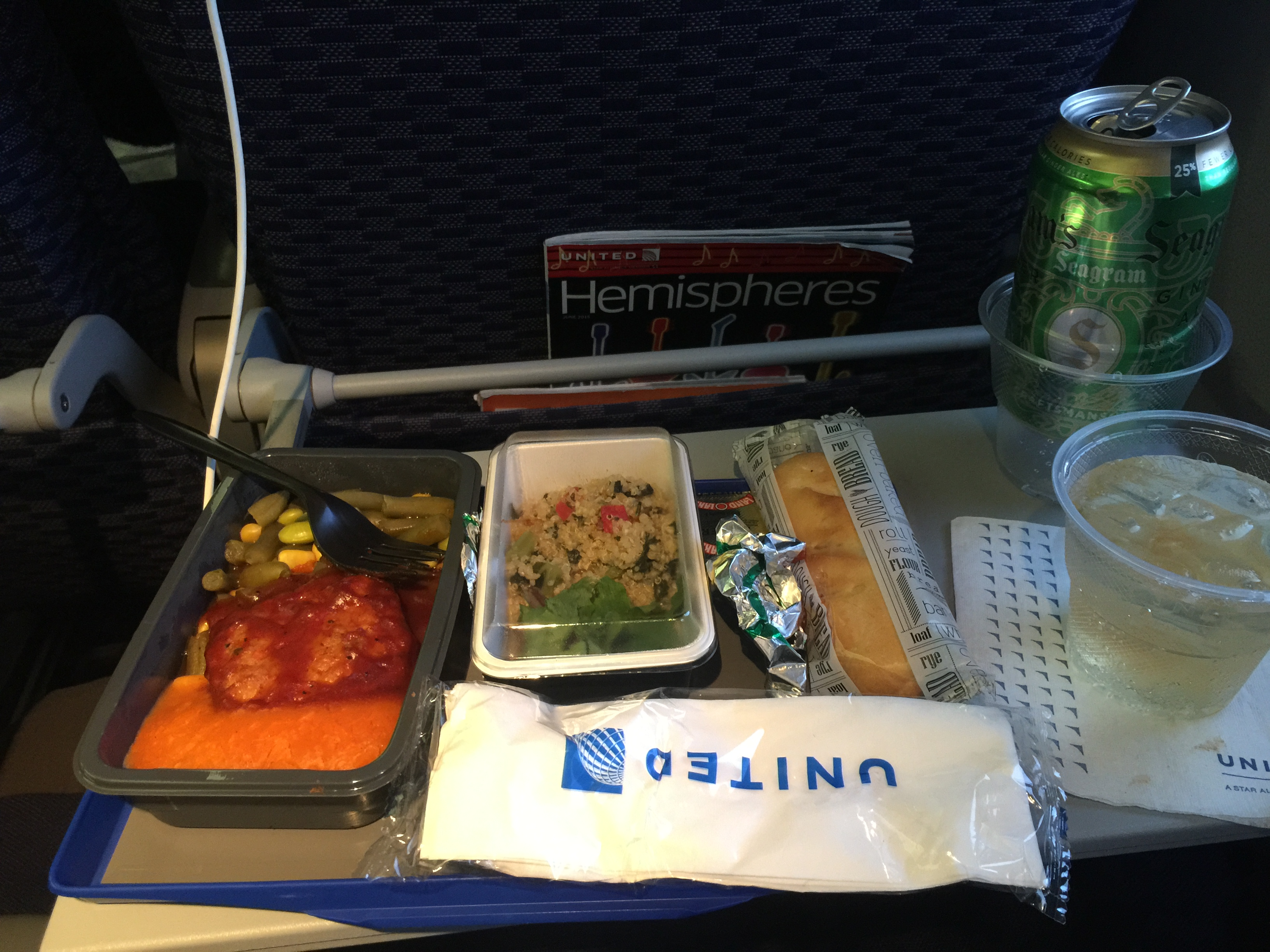
A United Airlines international economy meal from Washington, DC to Zürich

The type of food and service varies depending upon the airline company and class of travel. In economy class, they typically consist of pre-packaged frozen meals in plastic disposable containers (similar to TV dinners sold in supermarkets) that are heated up and are served on trays from the airline service trolley, all in order to speed up meal service due to the large numbers of passengers. Depending upon the airline, as well as length of the flight, several buy-on-board options including premium meals (subject to availability and may require preorder) may be purchased by economy passengers. Premium economy meal service varies between different airlines, usually still delivered upon a tray but on plates/bowls which are later washed/reused, and having a higher quality than economy, which may include some fresh fruit/vegetables, and perhaps a premium entrée similar to business class. In first and business classes, meals are typically served in multiple courses, with a tablecloth, metal cutlery, plates, and glassware, with service similar to that delivered by a waiter in a fine-dining restaurant (akin to 1930s in-flight dining), usually eschewing the tray and trolley of economy class.

The airline dinner typically includes meat (most commonly chicken or beef), fish, rice, noodles or pasta; a salad or vegetable; a small bread roll (with butter); and a dessert. Condiments (typically salt, pepper, and sugar) are supplied in small sachets or shakers. Often the food is reflective of the culture of the country the airline is based in or the country that the airplane is destined for (e.g. Indian, Japanese, Chinese, or Western meals).

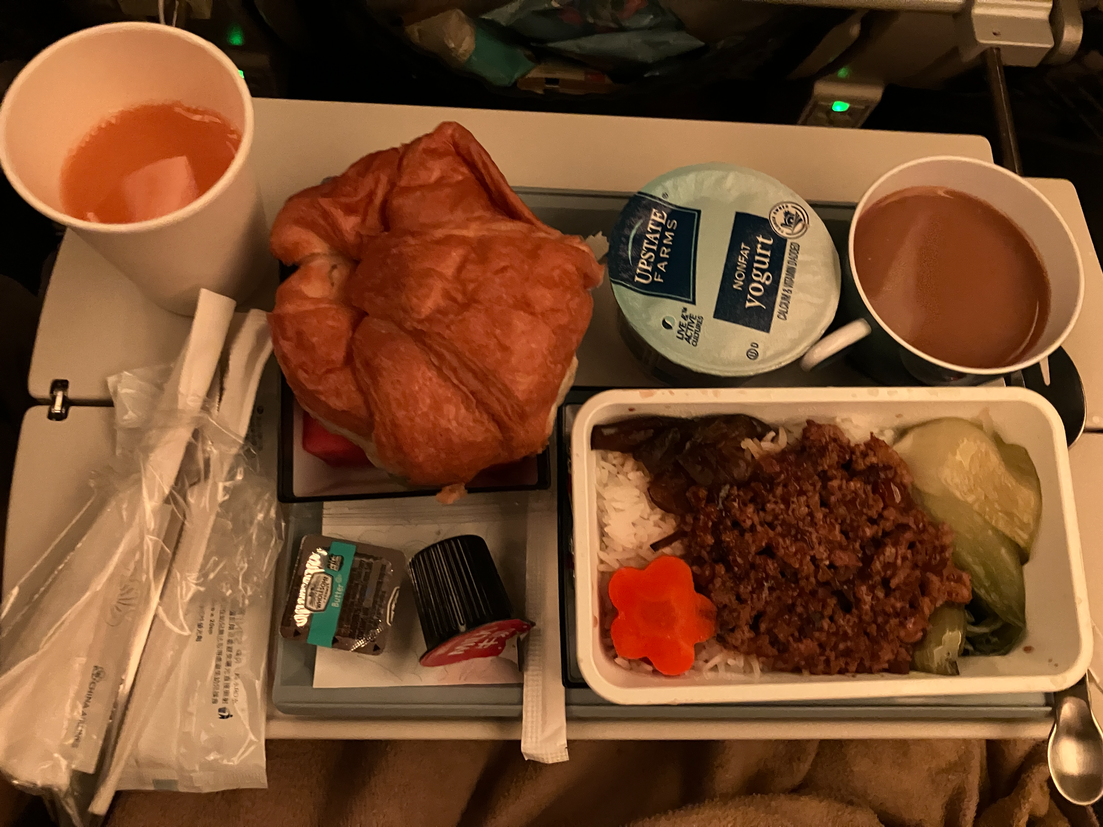
Braised pork rice served on a flight from Seattle to Taipei

Caterers usually produce alternative meals for passengers with restrictive diets. These must usually be ordered at least 24 hours in advance, sometimes when buying the ticket. Some of the more common examples include:

- Cultural diets, such as Turkish, French, Italian, Chinese, Japanese, Korean, or Indian style.
- Infant and baby meals. Some airlines also offer children's meals, containing foods that children will enjoy such as baked beans, mini-hamburgers, and hot dogs.
- Medical diets, including low/high fiber, low fat/cholesterol, diabetic, peanut free, non-lactose, low salt/sodium, low-purine, low-calorie, low-protein, bland (non-spicy), and gluten-free meals.
- Religious diets, including kosher, halal, and Hindu, Buddhist, and Jain vegetarian.
- Vegetarian meals, typically further defined as either lacto-ovo or vegan meals. These meals may follow a particular cuisine such as Asian cuisine or Western cuisine.

=== Halal food ===
For several Islamic and Middle Eastern airlines, in accordance with Islamic customs, all classes and dishes on the plane are served a Muslim meal with Halal certification – without pork and alcohol. While Emirates, Etihad Airways, Oman Air, and Qatar Airways provide bottles of wine to non-Muslim passengers, the cabin crew does not deliver alcoholic beverages lest they violate Islamic customs unless those non-Muslim passengers specifically request it. Turkish Airlines does not serve any meals with pork or lard, but especially during international flights, alcoholic beverages are served upon request. Because Iran and Saudi Arabia apply strict Sharia regulations, those countries' airlines, e.g. Iran Air, Mahan Air, and Saudia, do not deliver pork or alcoholic beverages, and all flights to or from Iran or Saudi Arabia regardless of their operating airline are prohibited from serving either. However, Garuda Indonesia serves alcoholic beverages (whiskey, beer, champagne, and wine) upon request.

=== Kosher food ===
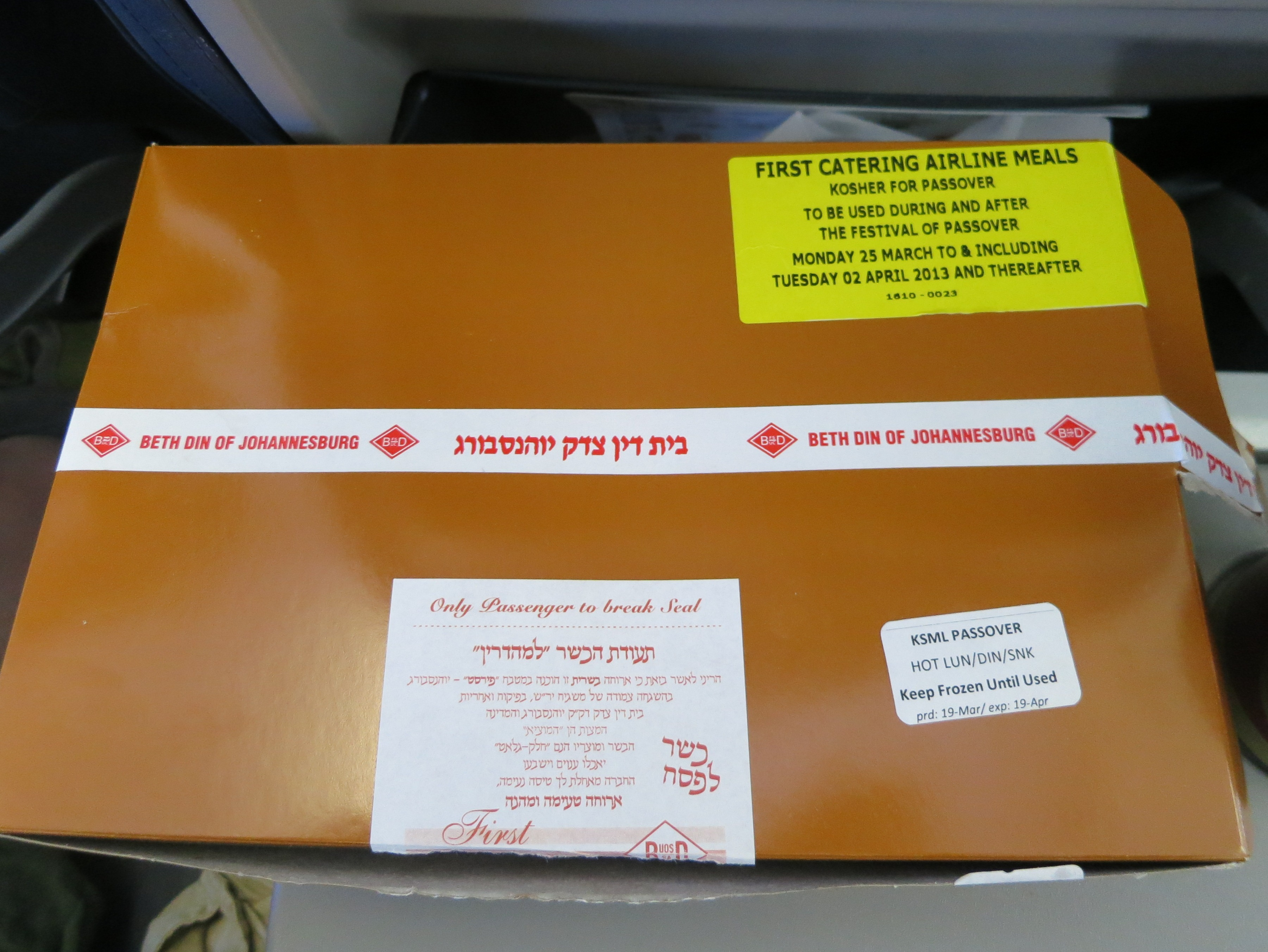
Inflight kosher meal approved by the Beth din of Johannesburg

In the case of Israeli airlines El Al, Arkia, and Israir, all meals served are kosher-certified by Rabbis. Even at destinations outside Israel, sky chefs must be supervised by rabbis to make kosher meals and load their planes. Many other airlines also supply kosher-certified meals, which they buy in from outside certified providers and are supplied to the passengers sealed. These may contain food in double-wrapped foil containers which can be heated up in the plane oven, alongside non-kosher food, without breaking the appropriate dietary laws.

=== Cutlery and tableware ===
Before the September 11, 2001 attacks, first class passengers were often provided with full sets of metal cutlery. Afterward, common household items were evaluated more closely for their potential use as weapons on aircraft, and both first class and coach class passengers were restricted to plastic utensils. Some airlines switched from metal to all-plastic or plastic-handled cutlery during the SARS outbreak in 2003, since the SARS virus transfers from person to person easily, and plastic cutlery can be thrown away after use. Many airlines later switched back to metal cutlery. However, some airlines such as Singapore Airlines, Qatar Airways, Japan Airlines, Emirates, Garuda Indonesia, Lufthansa and Swiss International Air Lines continue to use metal utensils even in economy class as of 2019.

Some airlines also made the switch to plastic cutlery in economy class to recover costs resulting from passenger theft, of which metal cutlery tends to be a common item targeted.

In May 2010, concerns were raised in Australia and New Zealand over their respective flag carriers, Qantas and Air New Zealand, reusing their plastic cutlery for international flights between 10 and 30 times before replacement. Both airlines cited cost saving, international quarantine, and environmental as the reasons for the choice. Both have also said that the plastic cutlery is commercially washed and sterilized before reuse. Reusing plastic tablewares though is a regular practice among many airliners and food caterers.

For cleanliness, most meals come with a napkin and moist towelette. First and business class passengers are often provided with hot towels, as well as tablecloths.

=== Breakfast ===
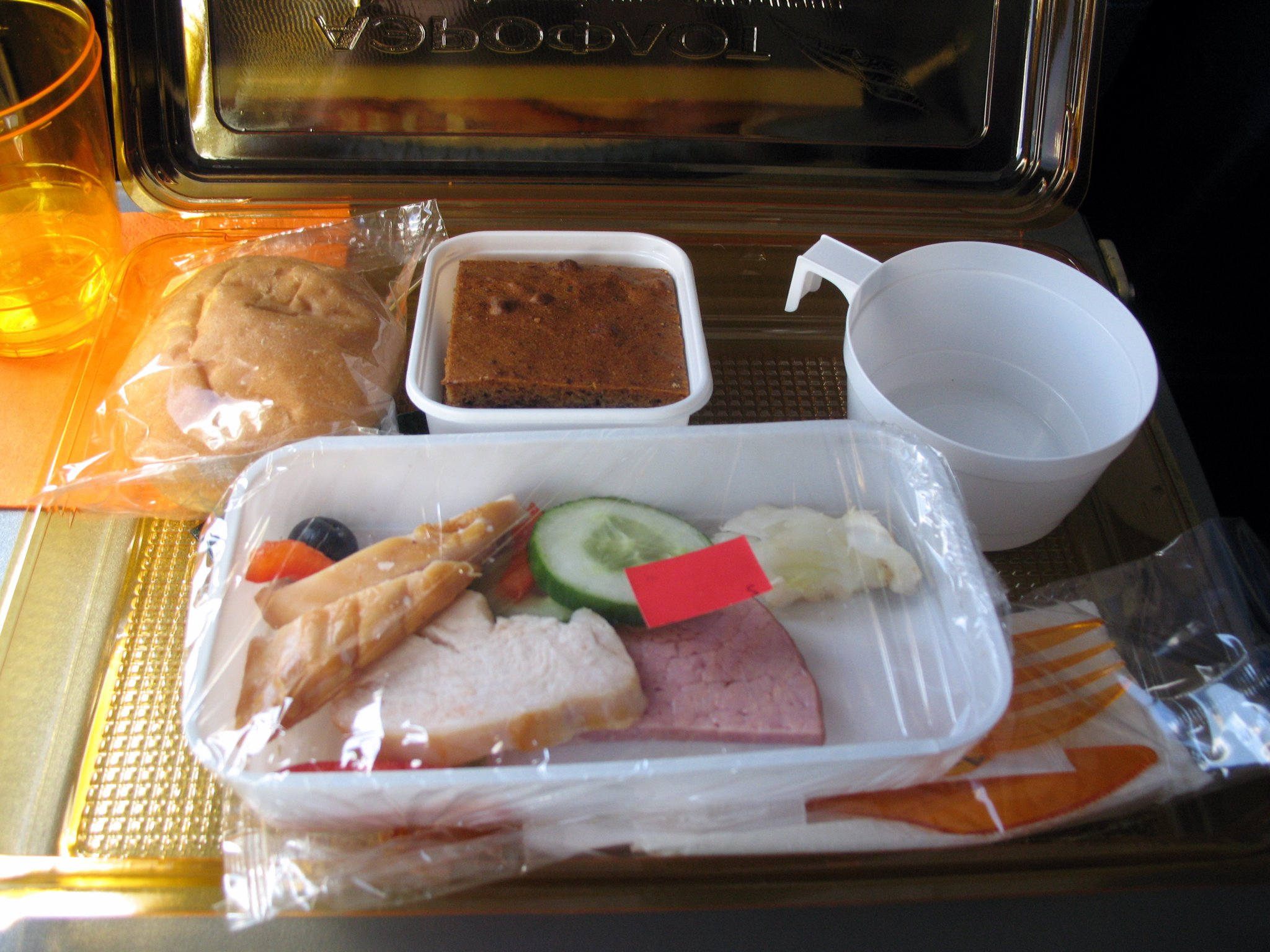
Breakfast served on a short-haul Aeroflot flight

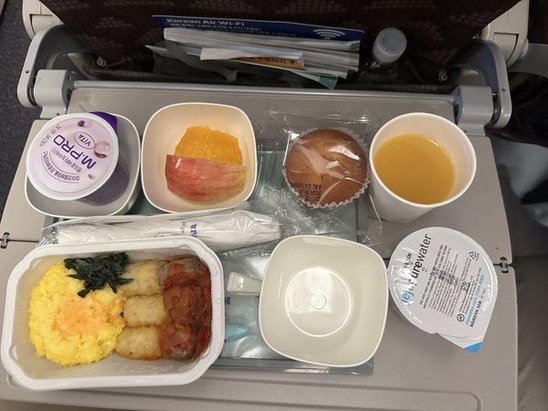
A western-style breakfast served on a Korean Air flight

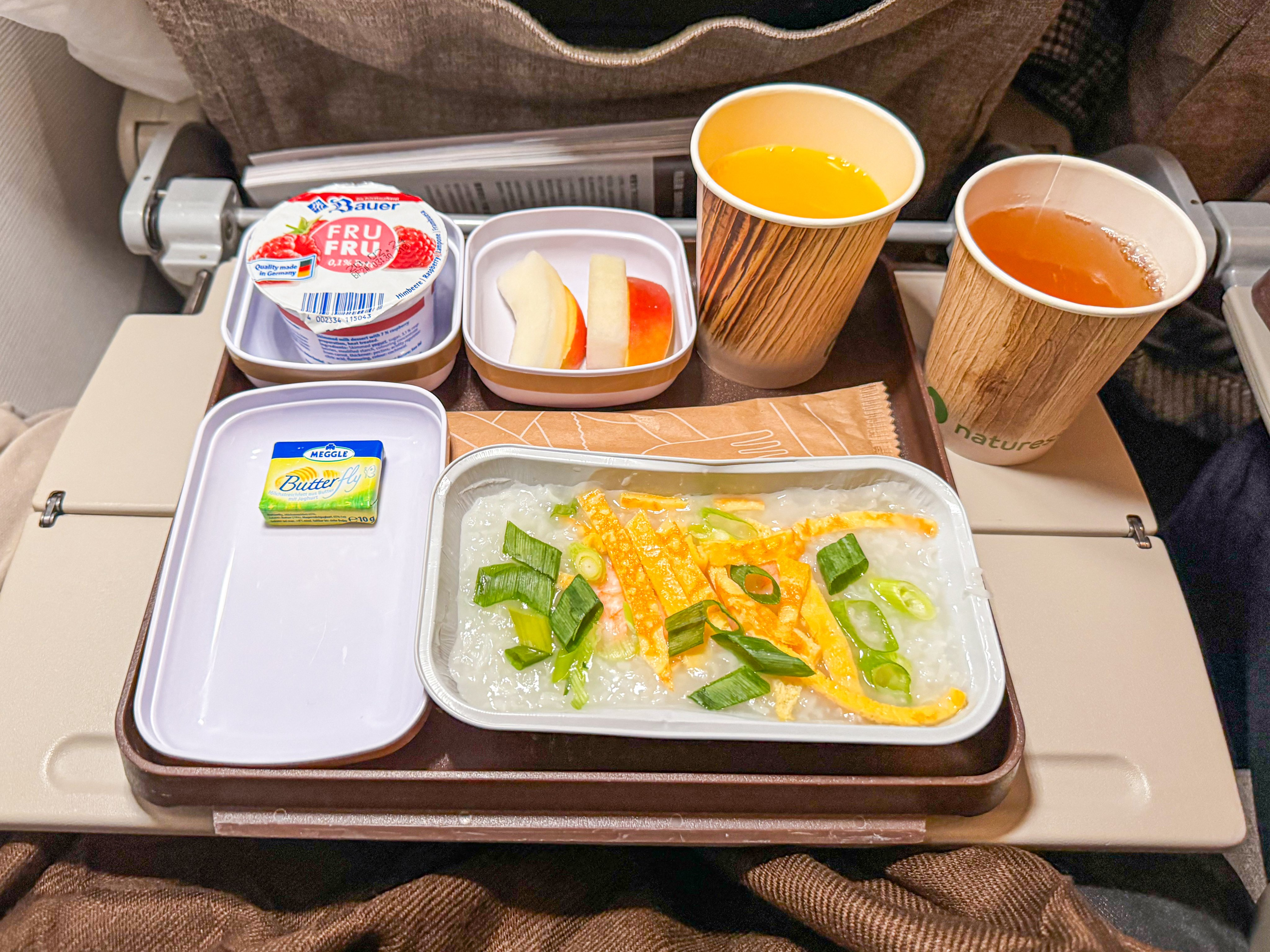
Chinese-style breakfast congee served on a China Eastern Airlines flight from Frankfurt to Shanghai

During overnight and morning flights a cooked breakfast or smaller continental-style may be served. On long-haul flights (and short/medium haul flights within Asia) breakfast normally includes an entrée of pancakes or eggs, traditional fried breakfast foods such as sausages and grilled tomatoes, and often muffins or pastries, fruits, and breakfast cereal on the side. On shorter flights a continental-style breakfast, generally including a miniature box of breakfast cereal, fruits and either a muffin, pastry, or bagel. Coffee and tea are offered as well, and sometimes hot chocolate.

== Cost ==
Food on board a flight is usually free on full-service Asian airlines and almost all long-distance flights, while they might cost extra on low-cost airlines or short-haul European full-service airline flights. Quality may also fluctuate due to shifts in the economics of the airline industry.

On long-haul international flights in first class and business class, most Asian and European airlines serve gourmet meals, while legacy carriers based in the US tend to serve multicourse meals including a cocktail snack, appetizer, soup, salad, entrée (chicken, beef, fish, or pasta), cheeses with fruit, and ice cream. Some long-haul flights in first and business class offer such delicacies as caviar, champagne, and sorbet (intermezzo).

The cost and availability of meals on US airlines has changed considerably in recent years, as financial pressures have forced some airlines to either begin charging for meals, or abandon them altogether in favor of small snacks, as in the case of Southwest Airlines. Eliminating free pretzels saved Northwest $2 million annually. Nowadays, the main US legacy carriers (American, Delta, and United) have discontinued full meal service in economy class on short-haul US domestic and North American flights, while retaining it on most intercontinental routes; and at least one European carrier, Icelandair, follows this policy on intercontinental runs as well.

As of 2018, all four major U.S. legacy airlines now offer free snacks on board in economy class. United re-introduced free snacks in February 2016. From April 2016, American fully restored free snacks on all domestic flights in economy class. Free meals will also be available on certain domestic routes. Delta and Southwest have already been offering free snacks for years.

Air China has reported that each domestic flight's meal requires RMB50 (US$7.30) while international flights require RMB70 (US$10). However, this figure varies from airline to airline, as some have reported costs to be as low as US$3.50. Air China is also minimizing costs by loading only 95% of all meals to reduce leftovers and storing non-perishable foods for emergencies.

In 1958, Pan Am and several European airlines entered into a legal dispute over whether certain airline food sandwiches counted as a "meal".

== Preparation ==
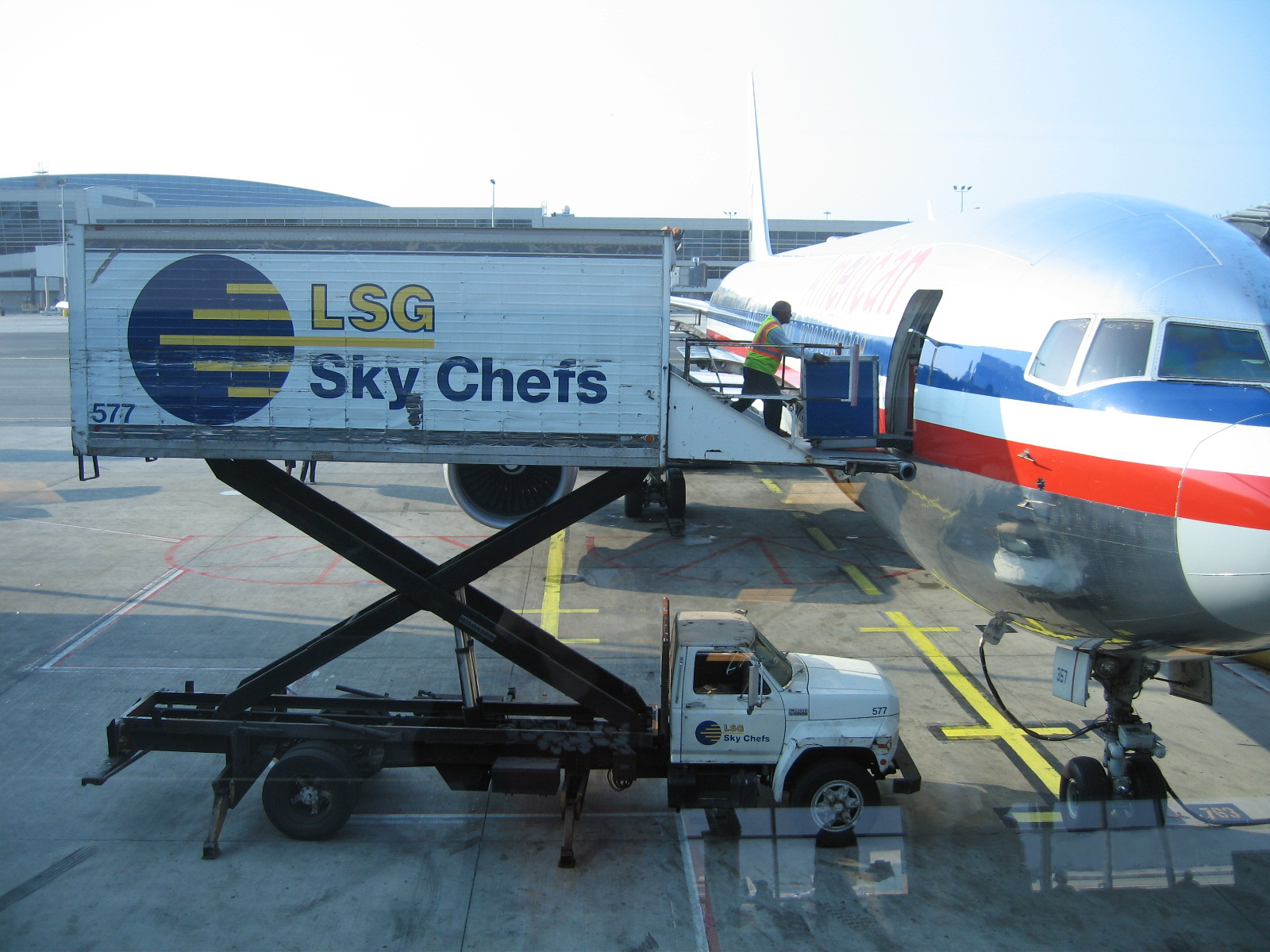
Food being delivered to an American Airlines Boeing 767

Most airline meals are prepared on the ground before take-off, though some are prepared at cruising altitude. Guillaume de Syon, a history professor at Albright College who wrote about the history of airline meals, said that higher altitudes alter the taste of the food and the function of the taste buds; according to de Syon the food may taste "dry and flavorless" as a result of the pressurization and passengers, feeling thirsty due to pressurization, may drink alcohol when they ought to drink water. Tests have shown that the perception of saltiness and sweetness drops 30% at high altitudes. The low humidity in airline cabins also dries out the nose which decreases olfactory sensors which are essential for tasting flavor in dishes, so as a result, airline meals tend to be more thoroughly seasoned to increase their flavour.

=== Food safety ===
Food safety is paramount in the airline catering industry. A case of mass food poisoning amongst the passengers on an airliner could have disastrous consequences. For example, on February 14, 1992, shrimp tainted with cholera was served on Aerolíneas Argentinas Flight 386. An elderly passenger died and other passengers fell ill. For this reason catering firms and airlines have worked together to provide a set of industry guidelines specific to the needs of airline catering. The World Food Safety Guidelines for Airline Catering is offered free of charge by the International Flight Service Association.

On 18 May 2011, on an American Airlines Barcelona to JFK flight, 73-year-old Othon Cortes died due to Clostridium perfringens, with food prepared by LSG Sky Chefs.

== Different meals for pilots ==
A February 1975 flight where Japanese Coca-Cola salesmen and their wives, who were being rewarded by their company with a visit to France stopped over at Ted Stevens Anchorage International Airport. Ham and cheese omelets had been brought onboard for breakfast, which made 196 passengers ill, on the flight from Tokyo to France. This 1975 Japan Air Lines food poisoning incident is the reason why airline pilots and co-pilots do not eat the same food as the passengers. Prof Stanley Mohlers and Kenneth N. Beers of Wright State University Medical School in Dayton, Ohio believed that food poisoning was an untrivial risk for airline crew.

== See also ==
- Ekiben, a variety of bento box associated with train stations and rail travel in Japan
- Dnata
- Do & Co
- Gategroup
- Kosher airline meal
- LSG Sky Chefs
- Singapore Airport Terminal Services (SATS)
- Frozen meal
- Space food
