= Boonshoft School of Medicine =

School of Wright State University in Dayton, Ohio, US

Coordinates: 39.777935°N 84.061760°W

- Type: Public medical school
- Established: 1973
- Parent institution: Wright State University
- Dean: Dr. Raj Mitra
- Academic staff: 391
- Students: 430
- Location: Dayton, Ohio, U.S.
- Campus: Suburban
- Website: medicine.wright.edu

The Boonshoft School of Medicine, also known as Wright State University School of Medicine, is an accredited medical school at Wright State University. It is located in Dayton, Ohio, United States and serves the Miami Valley region of southwestern Ohio. The school was renamed in 2005 in honor of Oscar Boonshoft who gifted $28.5 million to further medical education, research, and scholarship.

== History ==
Wright State University School of Medicine was established by the Ohio General Assembly in 1973 after Congress passed the Veterans Administration Medical School Assistance and Health Manpower Training Act, which provided financial support for establishing five new U.S. medical schools. The VA awarded the school a $19.5 million, seven-year grant for faculty support and facilities. Other major founding donors included Mrs. Virginia Kettering, who contributed $1 million in unrestricted funds, and the Fordham Foundation, which provided $500,000 for a medical library.

The school's charter class began studies in 1976 and graduated in 1980. Since then, more than 2,820 physicians have graduated from the School of Medicine.

In 2005, the school changed its name to the Wright State University Boonshoft School of Medicine in recognition of the Oscar Boonshoft family, which gave Wright State's largest philanthropic gift to the medical school.

In 2009, the school became the first medical school in the United States to debut its own medical student-produced radio program, dubbed Radio Rounds.

== Education ==
=== Curriculum ===
The Boonshoft School of Medicine is accredited by the Liaison Committee on Medical Education (LCME). In 2021, Wright State University's Boonshoft School of Medicine implemented a curriculum consisting of 19.5 months of basic science training followed by 45 months of clinical training. Students take the USMLE Step 1 exam at the end of their basic science training before transitioning to clinical curriculum. Instead of operating a university-based hospital for clinical training, Wright State is affiliated with five major teaching hospitals in the Greater Dayton area and has formal affiliation agreements with more than 25 other health care institutions in the Miami Valley.

The Boonshoft School of Medicine also offers combined degree programs, including:

- MD/MBA
- MD/MPH
- MD/MS
- MD/PhD

==== Major teaching affiliates ====
The school's major teaching affiliates include:

- Dayton Children's Hospital
- Dayton Veterans Affairs Medical Center
- Miami Valley Hospital
- Kettering Medical Center
- Wright-Patterson Medical Center

Apart from the above list, the medical school also has 26 other minor affiliates.

=== Research ===
The school houses National Centers of Research Excellence including the National Center for Medical Readiness, the Lifespan Health Research Center, which houses the nation’s largest and oldest study of human growth and development, the Wright State University and Premier Health Partners Neuroscience Institute at Miami Valley Hospital, and the Center for Interventions, Treatment, and Addictions Research. In fall 2007, five researchers associated with the Neuroscience Institute won a prestigious Program Project Grant from the National Institute of Neurological Disorders and Stroke. The $4.8 million grant is the first Program Project Grant Wright State University has received. In the fiscal year of 2010, Wright State University received 610 research awards for a total of $94,111,241. Federal grants were received from the Department of Health and Human Services and various National Institutes of Health, the Department of Defense, NASA and the Department of Education.

The Department of Community Health at Boonshoft School of Medicine ranks 10th out of 129 accredited M.D.-granting U.S. medical schools for the total amount of research funding it has received from the National Institutes of Health in the area of Public Health and Preventive Medicine.

The National Center for Medical Readiness (NCMR), housed at the Boonshoft School of Medicine, is a response organization for large scale emergencies, such as a weather disaster, terrorist attack or hazmat situation. The Center was established by the Wright State University Boonshoft School of Medicine Department of Emergency Medicine and has been certified as a National Disaster Life Support Foundation (NDLSF) Regional Training Center.

== Notable people ==
=== Faculty ===
- Siva S. Banda – aerospace engineer
- Kenneth N. Beers – NASA physician
- Mary Anne Frey - NASA physician
- Alireza Marandi – physician
- Jerrold S. Petrofsky – physician
- Charles H. Roadman II – Air Force Surgeon General
- Rosalyn Scott – the first African-American woman to become a thoracic surgeon

=== Alumni ===
- Mark E. Green – American politician, physician, and retired U.S. Army Major
- Richard Scheuring – NASA Flight surgeon
