= Radio Rounds =

- Today's Stories. Tomorrow's Doctors.
- Genre: Medical Talk Show
- Running time: 30 min
- Country of origin: United States
- Language: English
- Home station: WYSO, WWSU
- Hosted by: Avash Kalra; Lakshman Swamy; John Corker; Sam Roberto; Teresa Lee
- Created by: Avash Kalra
- Executive producers: Shamie Das; Yojan Patel; Sarah Buckingham
- Recording studio: Dayton, Ohio
- Original release: 2009 – present
- Website: http://www.radiorounds.org

Radio Rounds is a medical radio talk show produced and hosted entirely by medical students.

With an official tagline stating "Today's Stories / Tomorrow's Doctors" and targeting an audience that includes the general public, medical students, and physicians, Radio Rounds is the first radio program in the United States produced entirely by medical students.

Created in 2008 by medical student Avash Kalra and founded as a 501(c)(3) nonprofit organization by Kalra, Lakshman Swamy, and Shamie Das, Radio Rounds premiered on April 12, 2009. Since that time, Radio Rounds has featured over 100 guests, including Pulitzer Prize winners, decorated global health workers, and even a former U.S presidential candidate. By hosting guests such as world-renowned physician and author Rachel Naomi Remen and NBA Team Physician of the Year Brian Cole (Chicago Bulls), the show has focused on showcasing qualities of medicine such as humanism and empathy and has created a dialogue about the practice of medicine from different perspectives.

Radio Rounds airs every Sunday afternoon from 12 p.m. to 12:30 p.m. ET, via live streaming audio on the program's website, and on National Public Radio (NPR) affiliate station WYSO. Free podcasts of each episode are also available on iTunes, and those can be accessed via the show's website, www.radiorounds.org, or by searching the iTunes Store for "Radio Rounds."

== History ==
Radio Rounds was founded in 2008, and after several months of preparation and marketing, the program premiered on April 12, 2009.

With medical students Avash Kalra and Lakshman Swamy as the original hosts, the premiere episode broke the all-time WWSU record for online listenership, and the show was subsequently featured in a front page story of the following week's The Guardian, Wright State University's student newspaper. A transcribed interview with Kalra and Swamy was later published in the Spring/Summer 2009 edition of Vital Signs, a magazine produced for the Boonshoft School of Medicine. In it, Kalra explained his motivation for wanting to create the show, saying,

"Part of the culture of medicine involves medical students listening to and learning from mentors. So, we thought, why not do something like that on a weekly basis, but in a fun and engaging way?"

Added Swamy,

"Doctors seem to appreciate the idea of talking about medicine, creating a dialog about what makes the practice of health care so unique. This idea is one of the core visions of the project—to create a forum for the discussion of physicianhood itself."

Season Two of Radio Rounds premiered on August 9, 2009. The second season of Radio Rounds, which featured a lineup of accomplished physician-authors, concluded on December 6, 2009 with a special interview with Pulitzer Prize–winning author Tracy Kidder. Another Season Two highlight was a unique live-audience talk show at a regional American Medical Students Association conference, in which Kalra, Swamy, and Das interviewed U.S. Congresswoman Jan Schakowsky.

Season Three of Radio Rounds consisted of 13 episodes in the late winter and early spring of 2010. The third season of the show also marked the debut of host John Corker, a medical student at the Wright State University Boonshoft School of Medicine.

Season Four of the program premiered in August 2010 and included several landmark moments, including the celebration of the show's 50th episode. In addition, the cast of hosts expanded to include medical students Teresa Lee, Adam Deardorff, John Mark Mclain, and Casey McCluskey. In addition, Yojan Patel joined the Radio Rounds team as a producer of the show.

Seasons Five and Six aired in 2011, and Season Seven is scheduled to premiere in January 2012.

== Format ==
Each episode of the show is 30 minutes and features an interview with at least one special guest, either live in the studio or via telephone. Guests include physicians, medical school admissions directors, students in different stages of their medical education, and other health care leaders.

Beginning with Episode 412 (i.e. the 12th episode of Season Four), the show began opening with a short "teaser clip" of the episode's featured guest. The structure of the program has evolved over time but traditionally features three segments: a short "intro," the featured interview, and an "outro" in which the hosts discuss topics related to the interview.

Beginning with its 11th episode, which aired on August 23, 2009, Radio Rounds began opening with a new theme song, entitled "Rounding on the Radio." The song is performed by Robert Mikan, Meera Menon, Cole Budinsky and Kevin Gulley—all medical students at the Boonshoft School of Medicine.

An additional feature that was included during Season Three episodes was a weekly "Residency Insights" segment, featuring short interview clips with residency program directors from around the country. This feature was added by the show's production team in order to give medical students additional exposure to future career possibilities.

Other interactive features of the show have included a mystery diagnosis "case of the week," medical headlines, live listener emails, website polls, and a song of the week.

== Guests ==
Guests during the first six seasons of the show have included:

- Dr. Rachel Naomi Remen, author of New York Times bestseller Kitchen Table Wisdom: Stories That Heal
- Dr. Elissa Ely: Psychiatrist, Op-Ed Columnist for The New York Times and The Boston Globe, Former National Public Radio Contributor
- Tracy Kidder: Pulitzer Prize winning American author of Mountains Beyond Mountains: The Quest of Dr. Paul Farmer, A Man Who Would Cure the World and his latest book Strength In What Remains
- Dr. Martin Makary: Chair of Gastrointestinal Surgery and Director of the Johns Hopkins Center for Surgical Outcomes Research. Dr. Makary serves in leadership roles for the United Nations World Health Organization and is a regular medical guest on CNN.
- Dr. Stephen Bergman (a.k.a. Samuel Shem): Professor of Psychiatry at Harvard Medical School and author of The House of God
- Dr. Sandeep Jauhar: Director of the Heart Failure Program at Long Island Jewish Medical Center. He writes regularly for The New York Times and The New England Journal of Medicine and is the author of Intern: A Doctor’s Initiation.
- Dr. Evan Lyon: Internist, Editor of the Journal of Health and Human Rights, Physician for Partners in Health organization.
- Dr. Robert Marion: Professor of Pediatrics and Obstetrics and Gyneclogy at the Albert Einstein College of Medicine in the Bronx, New York, Author of six published books, including The Intern Blues and Learning to Play God: The Coming of Age of a Young Doctor.
- Dr. Michael Collins: Practicing orthopedic surgeon in Illinois, Author of Blue Collar, Blue Scrubs and Hot Lights, Cold Steel
- Dr. Harlan Selesnick: Team physician for the NBA's Miami Heat and the physician for the 2000 Gold Medalist U.S Men’s Olympic Basketball Team in Sydney, Australia
- Dr. Walter Hartwig: author of "Med School Rx: Getting In, Getting Through, and Getting On with Doctoring"
- Dr. Christine Montross: a psychiatrist at Brown University and author of the 2007 book entitled "Body of Work: Meditations on Mortality from the Human Anatomy Lab"
- Dr. Kevin Pho: the creator and author of KevinMD.com, the web’s leading physician blog with over 21,000 RSS subscribers and 16,000 Twitter followers
- Dr. Steven Novella: Director of Neurology at Yale University and host of The Skeptics' Guide to the Universe
- Dr. Jon Andrus: Deputy Director for the Pan American Health Organization (PAHO), part of the World Health Organization (WHO)
- Dr. James Rohack: American Medical Association (AMA) Past-President
- Governor Howard Dean, M.D.: Family physician by training, former Governor of Vermont, and 2004 U.S. Presidential candidate
- Margaret Edson: Pulitzer Prize–winning playwright of Wit
- Dr. Michael Barratt: Mission specialist with the NASA Space Shuttle Program
- Thomas Goetz: Author of The Decision Tree: Taking Control of Your Health in the New Era of Personalized Medicine and executive editor of Wired
- Travis Roy: Spinal cord injury survivor and founder of the Travis Roy Foundation
- Dr. Peggy Wilmoth: 2009-10 Robert Wood Johnson Health Policy Fellow on assignment with Speaker of the House of Representatives, Nancy Pelosi; Nursing professor at the University of North Carolina – Charlotte; Brigadier General in the United States Army Reserve
- Dr. Robert Hicks (Director) and Anna Dhody (Curator), from the Mütter Museum at the College of Physicians of Philadelphia
- Dr. Meena Seshamani, Director of the Department of Health and Human Services’ Office of Policy Analysis
- Dr. Lisa Sanders, New York Times columnist, Technical Advisor for House, and Assistant Clinical Professor of Medicine at Yale University
- Dr. Chris Coppola, Author of Coppola: A Pediatric Surgeon in Iraq
- Dr. Robert Arceci, Director of Pediatric Oncology at Johns Hopkins University and Creator of the Emmy-Award winning documentary A Lion in the House
- Dr. Harley Liker, Medical Technical Advisor for the television program House
- Dr. Michelle Au, an anesthesiologist and acclaimed author of This Won’t Hurt a Bit (And Other White Lies) and the blog "The Underwear Drawer"

== See also ==
- Wright State University
- Boonshoft School of Medicine
