= Mary Anne Frey =

American physiologist (1934–2019)

- Born: Mary Anne Bassett; December 15, 1934; Washington D.C., U.S.
- Died: September 13, 2019 (aged 84); Dayton, Ohio, U.S.
- Education: George Washington University
- Scientific career
- Workplaces: Boonshoft School of Medicine; Wright State University

Mary Anne Bassett Frey (December 15, 1934 – September 13, 2019) was chief scientist for the NASA Neurolab Spacelab module mission (STS-90). She researched the impact of gravity on astronauts.

== Early life and education ==
Frey attended Montgomery College, graduating in 1967. Frey completed a bachelor's degree in physics at George Washington University. She earned a PhD at George Washington in physiology in 1975. Whilst completing her doctoral studies Frey worked as a lecturer in the Department of Physiology at the George Washington University School of Medicine & Health Sciences and Montgomery College.

== Research ==
STS-90 Neurolab mission patch

Frey was appointed Assistant Professor at the Boonshoft School of Medicine in 1976. She developed the physiology curriculum. She studied the impact of exercise on high-density lipoprotein in women, identifying that there were not changes during ten weeks of training. She also worked on the cardiovascular response to mental stress. In 1986 she was appointed technical manager of The Bionetics Corporation at Kennedy Space Center. She served as a NASA visiting scientist with the Universities Space Research Association between 1987 and 1990. Frey was made professor in the Aerospace Medicine Residency Program. The 1990s were designated the Decade of the Brain, and NASA decided that it was important to understand the nervous system in space. She identified that the health symptoms astronauts experience in space are similar to ageing, but occur more rapidly and appear to be reversible. She studied the impact of lower-body negative pressure (LBNP) on men and identified that neither aerobic or strength fitness impacted responses to LBNP stress. Neurolab included measurements from sympathetic nerves before and after spaceflight, as well as monitoring the central nervous system in rats during spaceflight. She identified the correct dose of saline astronauts could take to countermeasure postflight orthostatic intolerance.

In 1993 Frey won the Aerospace Medical Association Louis H. Bauer Founders Award. She was assigned to the NASA Life Sciences Division in 1994 and studied the impact of space on the nervous system. Frey identified the cardiovascular and physiological responses of astronauts. She created a series of educational activities with NASA and the Morehouse School of Medicine. She studied the impact of aging on the cardiovascular response to postural change. In 1995 Frey won the Hubertus Strughold Award of the Space Medicine Association for her "significant contributions to space medicine". STS-90 launched on April 16, 1998. Frey served on the board of editors of the Aerospace Medical Association journal.
