= Rosalyn Scott =

First female African-American thoracic surgeon

Rosalyn P. Scott
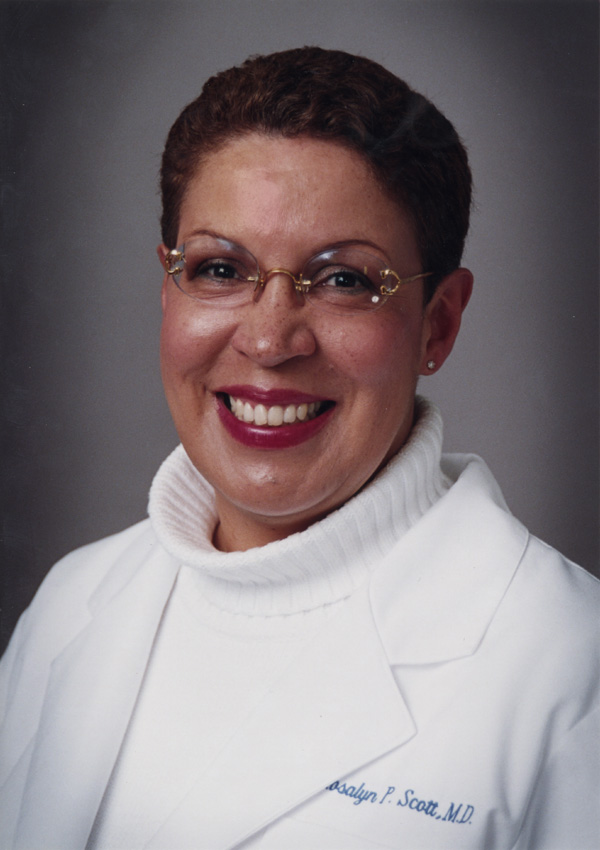
- Rosalyn P. Scott as featured in the NLM Opening Doors exhibit
- Born: Rosalyn P. Scott; 1950 (age 75–76); Newark, New Jersey, U.S.
- Education: Rensselaer Polytechnic Institute (BS); New York University School of Medicine (MD); University of Colorado Leeds School of Business (MSHA)
- Occupations: Thoracic surgeon; Medical educator
- Known for: First African American woman thoracic surgeon
- Awards: Mary A. Fraley Fellow; Full list

Rosalyn P. Scott (born 1950) is an American thoracic surgeon known for her work in education and for being the first African-American woman to become a thoracic surgeon.

== Early life and education ==
Scott was born and raised in Newark, New Jersey, and was inspired to become a physician by both her father and uncle. Her father was a dentist, and his dental office was the source of Scott's early exposure to medicine. She helped there on Saturday mornings by cleaning dental instruments, editing information on charts, and organizing patient documents. Scott's father suffered from a heart attack when she was in the third grade. He lived through it and later encouraged Scott to become a cardiothoracic surgeon. Not only was Scott inspired by her father, but her uncle was a thoracic surgeon and President of the hospital where he worked in Chicago.

Scott attended Rensselaer Polytechnic Institute in Troy, New York, for her undergraduate education, and earned a bachelor's degree in chemistry in 1970. She entered New York University School of Medicine, and graduated in 1974, despite being subject to the sexism and racism in the medical field during that time.

She remained in New York City for internships and residency at both St. Vincent's Hospital and Medical Center and St. Clare's Hospital and Health Center. Scott continued her residency as a thoracic surgeon at Boston University Medical Center from 1977 to 1979. She returned to New York City from Boston for residencies at St. Clare's Hospital and Health Center, once again, and New York Medical College, where she specialized in cardiac surgery and general surgery. By doing this, Scott became the first African-American woman to establish a residency in cardiothoracic surgery. Scott continued her training in cardiovascular surgery as a fellow at the Texas Heart Institute, where she was the first ever to receive the Mary A. Fraley cardiovascular fellowship in 1980. Following later graduate studies, in 1994, Scott received a Master of Science degree in Health Administration from the University of Colorado College of Business.

== Career ==
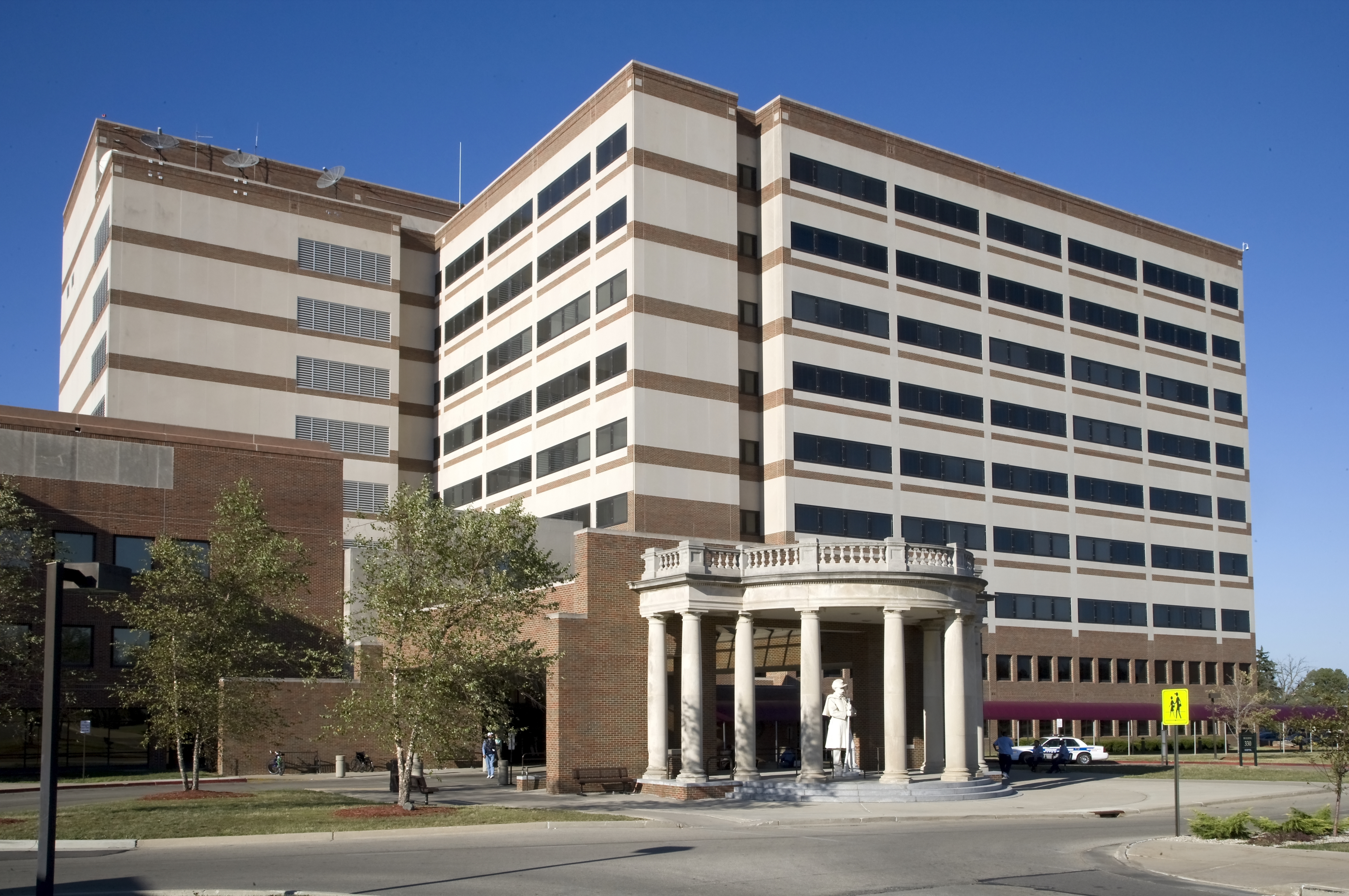
Dayton VA Medical Center, where Dr. Scott is currently Chief of Surgical Services

In 1981, after Scott completed her postgraduate education, she was appointed as an assistant professor of surgery at the University of Texas Medical School in Houston. She worked in Houston until 1983, when she was appointed as assistant professor of surgery at the University of California, Los Angeles (UCLA) and the Charles R. Drew University of Medicine and Science. In 1987, she left UCLA but continued her teaching role at Drew University of Medicine.

While at Drew University, Scott served as the associate director of the general surgery residency program (1990–1997), vice chair for research and academic affairs in the surgery department (1991–1997), as well as the director of the Drew Surgical Research Group (1993–1997). She was also an associate research professor (1994–1997) and adjunct professor (1998–2001) at the School of Health Administration and Policy at Arizona State University. Scott served as the Interim Director of the residency program for general surgery at Drew (2003–2004). While she had her appointment at the Drew Medical Center, Scott was also on the surgical staff of the Brotman Medical Center and the Harbour-UCLA Medical Center. While working at these locations, she focused on research for occupational stress within surgical residents and the health disparities in cardiovascular and lung cancer care.

In 2007, she left Drew for Wright State University, where she is currently a professor as well as the Chief of Surgical Services at the Dayton Veterans Affairs Medical Center in Dayton, Ohio.

Scott has been a pioneer for African-American women in the field of thoracic surgery and surgical education. She was the first African-American woman to become a thoracic surgeon and she was also the first African-American woman to be admitted to the Society of University Surgeons. She co-founded two organizations to support other surgeons and encourage students to fight discrimination: the Society of Black Academic Surgeons, which was founded in 1986, and the Association of Black Cardiovascular and Thoracic Surgeons, which was founded in 1999.

== Research ==
Scott has conducted extensive research over the years pertaining to the thoracic region of the body. Her research includes health care disparities affecting people with cardiovascular disease and lung cancer, and occupational stress affecting surgeons. She has served on numerous research boards as well as created other organizations for cardiovascular and thoracic doctors, including the Association of Black Cardiovascular and Thoracic Surgeons.

In 2015, Scott played an integral role in opening a state of the art simulation facility at the Dayton VA. The simulation center is the only mobile simulation center in the VA system. It includes equipment such as mannequins that have all of the vital functions of a real person in order to simulate real situations that occur in the hospital. The facility also includes all of the necessary equipment for emergency situations and technology to record the simulations, so they can be played back.

== Honors, awards, and distinctions ==
- The first African-American woman to be trained in thoracic surgery (1977)
- The first Mary A. Fraley Fellow, Texas Heart Institute (1980)
- Founding member, Society of Black Academic Surgeons (1986)
- First African-American woman to become a member of the Society of University Surgeons (1995)
- Founding member, Association of Black Cardiovascular and Thoracic Surgeons (1999)
- Former President, Women in Thoracic Surgery
