= Dayton Children's Hospital =

Coordinates: 39.7745°N 84.1688°W

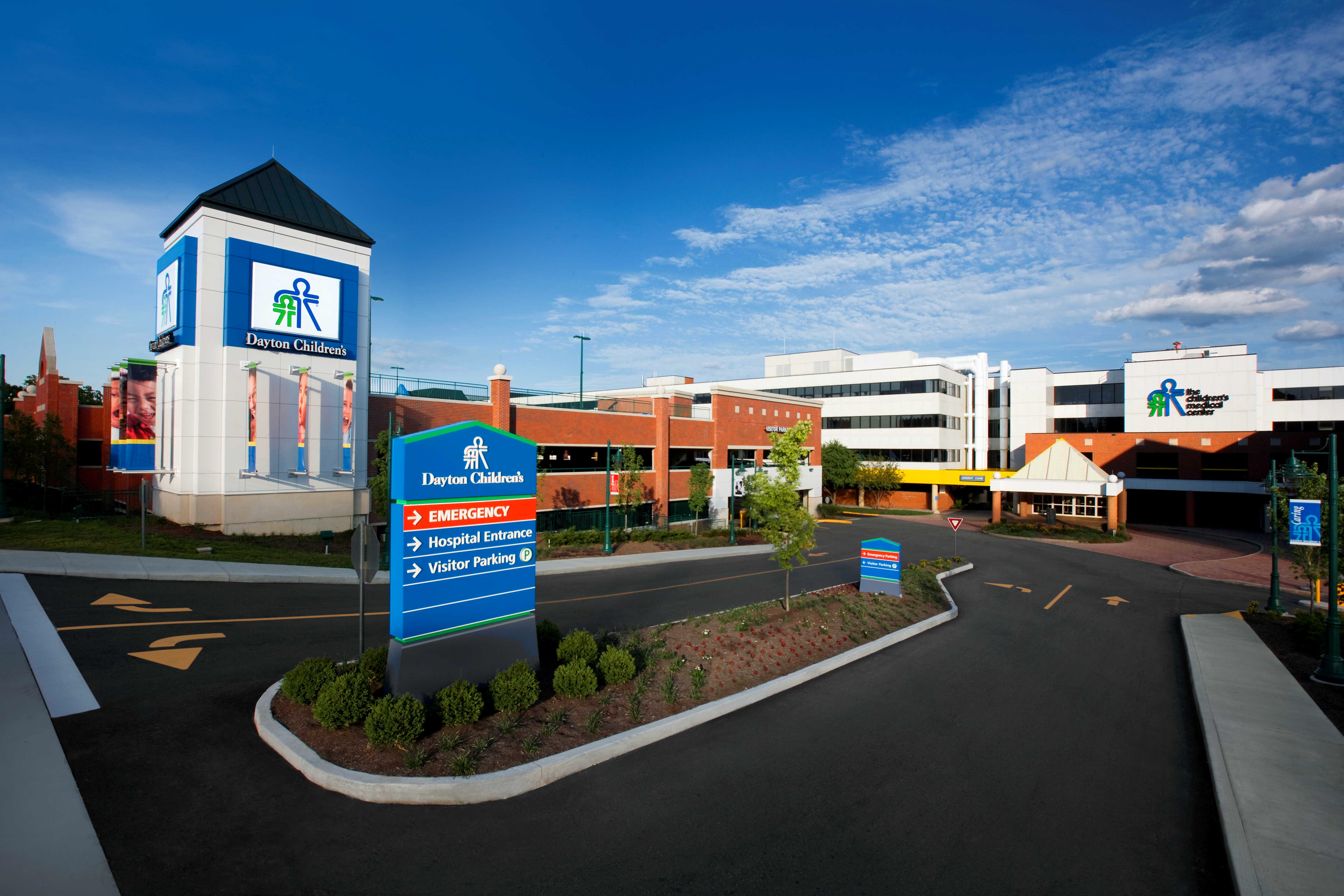
- Dayton Children's Hospital

Geography
- Location: Dayton, Ohio, United States

Organization
- Care system: Medicaid, Private Insurance, BCMH
- Type: Teaching, Tertiary Referral Center
- Affiliated university: Boonshoft School of Medicine of Wright State University

Services
- Emergency department: Level 1 Pediatric Trauma
- Beds: 181

Helipads
- Helipad: Aeronautical chart and airport information for 2OH5 at SkyVector

History
- Founded: 1967

Links
- Website: http://www.childrensdayton.org/
- Lists: Hospitals in Ohio

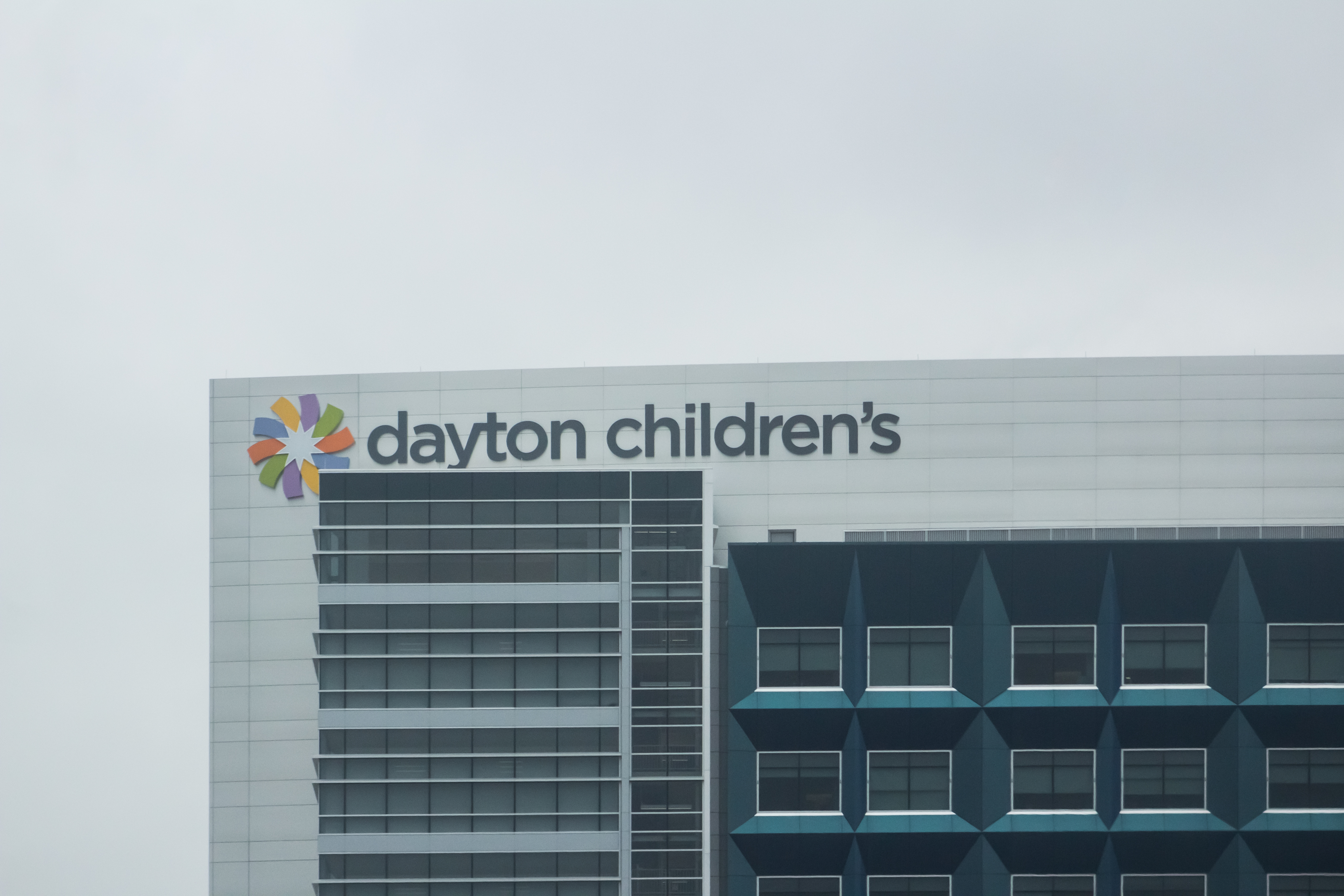
Dayton Children's Hospital seen from Ohio State Route 4.

Dayton Children's Hospital stylized as Dayton Children's formerly The Children's Medical Center of Dayton is a pediatric acute care children's teaching hospital located in Dayton, Ohio. The hospital has 231 pediatric beds and is affiliated the Boonshoft School of Medicine at Wright State University. The hospital provides comprehensive pediatric specialties and subspecialties to infants, children, teens, and young adults aged 0–21 throughout western Ohio and the surrounding states. Dayton Children's Hospital is also an ACS verified Level 1 Pediatric Trauma Center.

In 2003, the hospital was ranked one of America's top 25 children's hospitals by Child (magazine). The hospital is staffed with more than 1400 full-time employees, 300 part-time employees, and nearly 250 physicians. Dayton Children's Hospital is currently the only pediatric hospital in the Dayton region.

Dayton Children's Hospital is also partnered with Kohl's a Minute for Kids.

In 2026, it was reported that the hospital had received a $40 million grant from philanthropist Tom Golisano, which would be used to "move upstream" by expanding services and bringing services closer to areas where patients live. In honor of the gift, the hospital's main campus will be renamed as the Golisano Comprehensive Care Campus.

== History ==
=== Founding ===
In 1919, as America was ending World War I, Annae Barney Gorman, a philanthropist and community activist, had purchased a building on Chapel Street and was making plans for a community center to offer health services, education and recreation for North Dayton residents. Within a year, she opened the Barney Community Center, which provided neighborhood residents free clinics, occupational therapy classes, a milk station and lunch program.

Throughout her life, Gorman continued to be active and interested in the progress of the community center and lived to see it develop into the only convalescent hospital in the area designed to care for polio victims. To reflect the center's expanded mission, the name was changed to the Barney Convalescent Hospital in 1947.

With the advent of the Salk and Sabin vaccines in the mid-1950s, the need for a strictly convalescent hospital diminished. About that same time, a new need emerged—the need for a pediatric hospital to care for seriously ill and injured children.

In 1957, Elsie Mead worked tirelessly to form the Children's Hospital Society, which was dedicated to raising funds for the construction of a children's hospital. The board of the Barney Convalescent Hospital also recognized the need for a full-service children's hospital and joined forces with the hospital society in 1963. As the result of their efforts, The Barney Children's Medical Center, a four-story hospital located at 1735 Chapel Street, was opened in February 1967. Elsie Mead remained the hospital's guiding light—including several years as its board chairperson—until her death in 1980.

=== 1970s ===
In 1970, the medical center's name was changed to The Children's Medical Center. Dayton Children's evolved into a 155-bed private, not-for-profit hospital for infants, children and adolescents. This commitment to serving as the area's only hospital devoted to pediatric care led the way to additional construction.

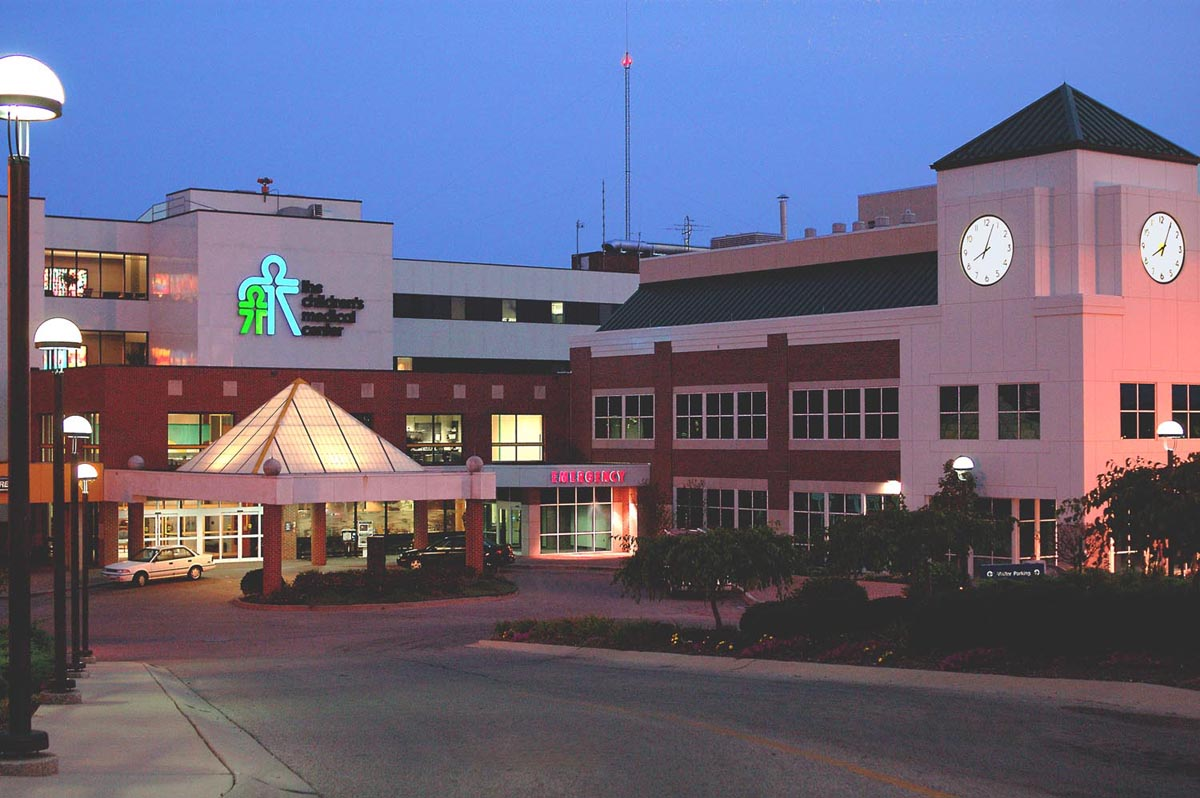
Dayton Children's at Night.

In 1979, an address change was approved at that year's annual meeting. The Chapel Street address became One Children's Plaza.

=== 21st century ===
The area outside Dayton Children's has undergone major changes over the years. Extensive landscaping, a parking garage directly off of Valley Street, new wayfinding elements and signage, expanded and renovated trauma and emergency center all make Dayton Children's more inviting and easier to locate. Dayton Children's has also worked with the Northeast Priority Board and other area organizations to brighten the Old North Dayton neighborhood that has been the hospital's home since its inception.

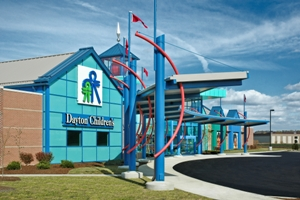
Outpatient center in Springboro

Most recently, there has been expansion beyond Old North Dayton and convenient facilities in the neighborhood. Currently, there are six outpatient centers in Beavercreek, Kettering, Springboro, Sugarcreek, Vandalia and Warren County. There are also two specialty care centers in Springfield and Warren County as well as a specialty clinics in Lima.

In May 2013, The Children's Medical Center of Dayton changed its name once again to Dayton Children's Hospital.

In October 2013, Dayton Children's announced a plan to improve the hospital. The plan calls for the construction of a 260,000 square-foot, eight-story patient tower in the center of the hospital's current Valley Street campus.

In March 2016, Dayton Children's announced a change to their 42 year old brand and logo. The new logo is called the Whirligig.

== Awards and recognition ==
Dayton Children's Hospital received the following:

- The Cancer Care program at Dayton Children's is one of only 10 accredited pediatric cancer programs in the country.
- In November 2013, Dayton Children's received Magnet designation®, nursing's highest honor.
- Dayton Children's is routinely named a "Top Workplace" by the Dayton Daily News.
- Dayton Children's was named Business of the Year in 2004 by the Dayton Business Journal.
- Dayton Children's is the 2004 Better Business Bureau Eclipse Integrity Award winner in the category of companies with more than 100 employees.
- Dayton Children's was ranked one of America's top 25 children's hospitals in 2003 by Child magazine for 2003–04.
- Dayton Children's pharmacy was one of three in the country receiving the Award of Excellence in Medication Use Safety
- The pediatric intensive care unit won the Ohio Patient Safety Institute Best Practices Award in 2009 for its record of decreasing the incidence of ventilator-associated pneumonia (VAP).

== Accreditations ==
The hospital has received the following accreditations:

- College of American Pathologists gave Dayton Children's laboratory full accreditation in 2007.
- American College of Radiology accredited the medical imaging services at the hospital.
- Intersocietal Commission for the Accreditation of Echocardiography Laboratories accredited the hospital's echocardiography laboratory.
- American College of Sleep Medicine accredited the Pediatric Sleep Center at Dayton Children's.
- Pediatric Residency Review Committee accredited the pediatric residency program at the hospital.
- The Comprehensive Cancer Care Center at Dayton Children's has been accredited by the American College of Surgeons.
- Dayton Children's was accredited by JCAHO in June 2003.
- The Cystic Fibrosis Center is accredited by National Cystic Fibrosis Foundation.
- The pediatric trauma center is a verified as a Level I Pediatric Trauma Center by the American College of Surgeons’ (ACS) Committee on Trauma
- Dayton Children's received Magnet designation®. on November 22, 2013.

== Magnet designation ==
Dayton Children's received Magnet designation. on November 22, 2013. Magnet designation is nursing's highest honor, meaning Dayton Children's Hospital has been recognized nationally as the gold standard in patient care and the professional practice of nursing by the American Nurses Credentialing Center (ANCC). Dayton Children's is one of only 31 pediatric Magnet hospitals nationwide and one of 26 Magnet hospitals in Ohio. The 393 Magnet designated organizations represent less than 7 percent of all U.S. health care organizations. Magnet hospitals have lower patient mortality, fewer medical complications, improved patient and employee safety, and higher patient and staff satisfaction.

== Locations ==
In addition to the main hospital, Dayton Children's Hospital has several outpatient testing centers in the Dayton area. These centers are located in Vandalia, Beavercreek, Springboro, Kettering, Springfield, Warren County, Lima and Sugarcreek.

== See also ==
- List of Children's Hospitals in the United States
- Cincinnati Children's Hospital Medical Center
- List of hospitals in the United States
- List of hospitals in Ohio
