= Japan Air Lines food poisoning incident =

1975 Boeing 747 incident

Coordinates: 55°37′5″N 12°39′22″E

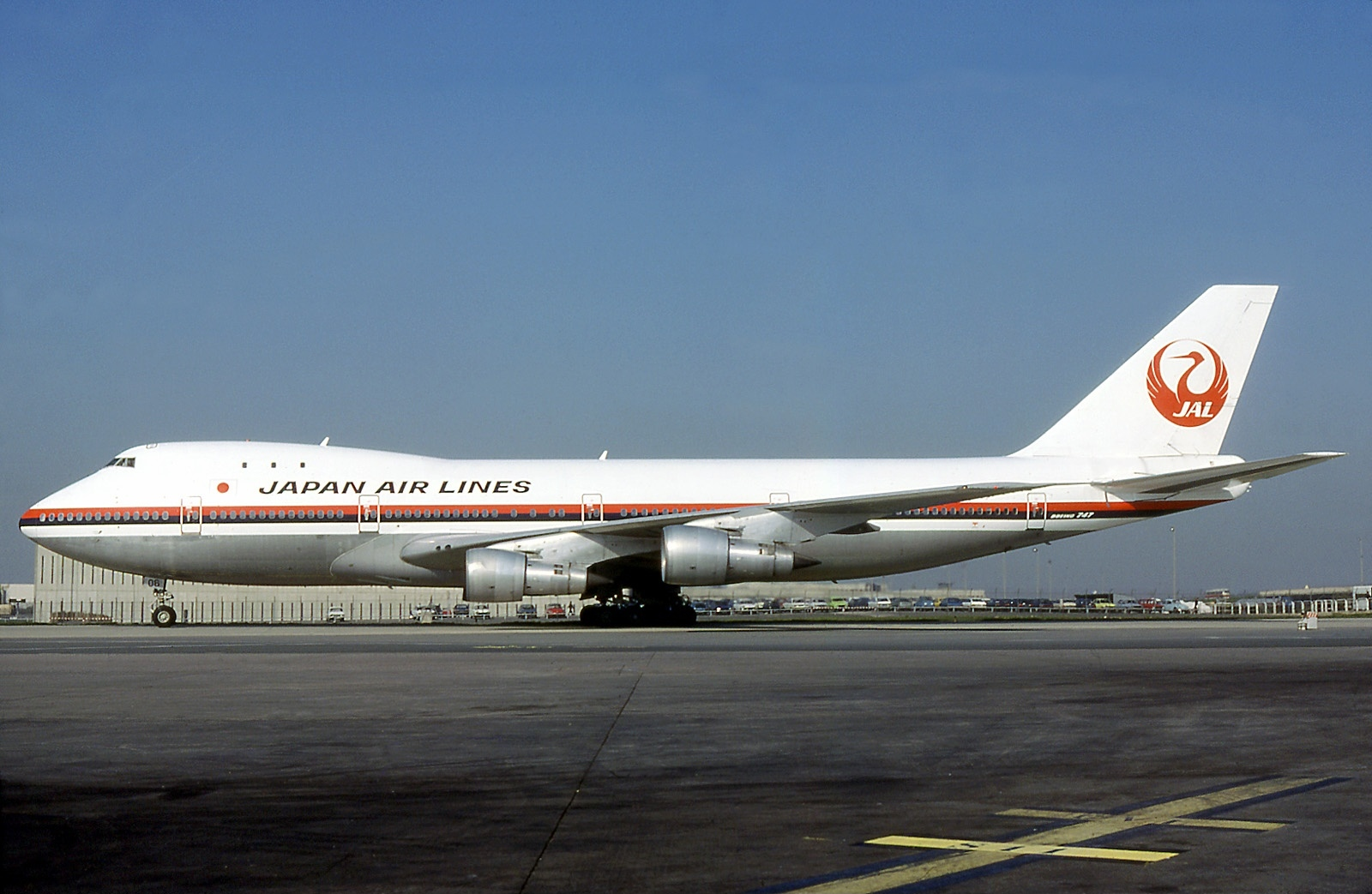
- JA8106, an aircraft similar to the one involved

Accident
- Date: 3 February 1975
- Summary: Mass outbreak of food poisoning caused by Staphylococcus aureus
- Site: Copenhagen Airport, Denmark

Aircraft
- Aircraft type: Boeing 747-246B
- Operator: Japan Air Lines
- Registration: Unknown
- Flight origin: Tokyo International Airport, Japan
- 1st stopover: Anchorage International Airport, United States
- 2nd stopover: Copenhagen Airport, Denmark
- Destination: Charles de Gaulle Airport, France
- Occupants: 364
- Passengers: 344
- Crew: 20
- Fatalities: 0 (1 on ground via suicide)
- Injuries: 144
- Survivors: 364

On 3 February 1975, 144 people fell ill aboard a Japan Air Lines Boeing 747 en route from Anchorage, United States, to Copenhagen, Denmark, after consuming an in-flight meal contaminated with Staphylococci.

== Aircraft and passengers ==
The incident occurred aboard a Boeing 747 operated by Japan Air Lines. At the time of the incident, Japan Air Lines had both the 747-100 and the 747-200B in their long-distance fleet.

The aircraft was carrying 344 passengers and 20 crew members. Most of the passengers on the charter flight were Japanese salesmen of The Coca-Cola Company and their family members, who had won a trip to Paris.

== Incident ==
The flight originated in Tokyo and was planned to terminate in Paris, with service stops in Anchorage and Copenhagen. In Anchorage, food prepared by a Japan Air Lines subsidiary was loaded onto the aircraft for meal service near the end of the flight.

About one hour after breakfast, while approaching Copenhagen, 143 passengers and one flight attendant fell ill with symptoms including vomiting and abdominal pain. All affected individuals were hospitalized at least overnight in Copenhagen, 30 of whom were reported to media to have required "intensive care", while the remaining passengers continued on to Paris.

As none of the doctors in Denmark spoke Japanese, and only few of the passengers were fluent in Danish or English, Japanese-speaking staff from Copenhagen restaurants were summoned to the hospital to act as translators.

== Investigation ==
The investigation team in Anchorage was led by United States Public Health Service officer Dr. Mickey S. Eisenberg of the Alaska State Health Department.

Laboratory tests of stool and vomit samples from passengers, as well as 33 samples of leftover ham omelets, detected Staphylococcus aureus. Elevated concentrations of toxins produced by the staphylococci were also detected in the ham, explaining the extremely short incubation time.

=== Contamination of meals ===
The investigation began by tracing the pathogens back to its origin, and focused on the facilities of International Inflight Catering, an Anchorage-based subsidiary of Japan Airlines, where the meals had been prepared. It was found that three cooks had prepared the meals, one of whom had infected lesions on the index and middle finger of his right hand. The lesions on the cook's fingers were found to be infected with staphylococci. Tests revealed identical phage types and antibiotic resistances for all samples, indicating that the cook was the source of the contamination.

The aircraft had four galleys from which 364 meals were served, 40 in first class and 108 from each galley on the main deck. According to Eisenberg, the suspect cook had prepared meals for three of the four galleys. He had bandaged the lesions but had not reported them to his superior, as he considered them trivial. Also, management had not verified that he was in good health, despite being required to do so, according to Eisenberg.

The suspect cook had prepared all 40 omelets served in first class, as well as 72 out of 108 for one of the main deck galleys. Furthermore, he handled all 108 omelets for another galley (sources differ on whether he put the ham on these omelets, or both cooks took the slices of ham for the omelets they prepared from the same container). He had therefore handled a total of 220 meals. According to Eisenberg's hypothesis, 36 people who received a meal from one of the front galleys, as well as the 108 who were served their meal from the rear one, had eaten meals which were not contaminated.

=== Spread of pathogens ===
According to microbiologists, it can take as few as 100 staphylococci to cause food poisoning. In-flight catering logistics provided ideal conditions for the bacteria to grow and release toxins, which induce severe nausea, vomiting, diarrhea and abdominal cramps. Being heat-resistant, the toxins were not destroyed when the omelets were heated.

Prior to being served, the meals had been stored at room temperature in the kitchen for 6 hours, then refrigerated (albeit at an insufficient 10 °C (50 °F)) for 14½ hours and then stored in the aircraft ovens, again without refrigeration, for another 8 hours. Had the food been kept properly refrigerated from the time it was prepared until it was ready to be served, the outbreak would not have occurred.

Danish doctors stated that most of those who fell ill had occupied seats in the front section of the aircraft, consistent with Eisenberg's hypothesized distribution pattern of the contaminated omelets. 86% of those who ate omelets handled by the suspect cook fell ill, whereas none of those who ate one of the other omelets developed symptoms.

== Aftermath ==
Japan Air Lines' catering manager, 52-year-old Kenji Kuwabara, committed suicide upon learning that the incident had been caused by one of his cooks. He was the only fatality linked to the incident.

Investigators emphasized that people with infected lesions should not handle food and that food should be stored at temperatures low enough to inhibit the growth of bacteria.

The pilot and first officer had not eaten any of the contaminated omelets, and the airline had no regulations regarding crew meals. As the pilots' biological clocks were on Alaska time rather than European time, they had opted for a dinner of steaks instead of omelets—had they not done so, they might not have been capable of landing the aircraft safely. Eisenberg suggested that cockpit crew members eat different meals prepared by different cooks to prevent food poisoning outbreaks from incapacitating the entire crew, a rule subsequently implemented by many airlines, or alternately preparing crew meals with ingredients considered to have less risk of propagating foodborne illness.

== See also ==
- Aerolíneas Argentinas Flight 386, a 1992 incident in which dozens of passengers contracted cholera through their meals, killing one.
- Flight into Danger, a 1956 Canadian telefilm with a similar theme. The telefilm was later remade as the 1957 motion picture Zero Hour!, and later the 1980 comedy Airplane!, which shared the same plot and much of the same dialogue.
