= Rachel Naomi Remen =

American physician and author (1938–2026)

Rachel Naomi Remen (February 8, 1938 – August 8, 2026) was an American pediatrician who gained fame as an author, medical educator, and pioneer in integrative medicine. She was a professor at the Osher Center of Integrative Medicine at the University of California, San Francisco. Together with Michael Lerner, she was a founder of the Commonweal Cancer Help Program, a cornerstone program at Commonweal. She was the founder of the Institute for the Study of Health & Illness. She has been featured on the PBS television series, Thinking Allowed. She drew on Jewish traditional wisdom "to propose that the future is determined by the potential of the present."

Remen's most well-known books include Kitchen Table Wisdom and My Grandfather's Blessing, both of which made The New York Times Best Seller list. Kitchen Table Wisdom has been translated into 21 languages, and has sold over 700,000 copies worldwide. She was also the founder of a medical student curriculum called "The Healer's Art" used in medical schools throughout the United States.

Remen died on August 8, 2026, at the age of 88.
