= Aerolíneas Argentinas Flight 386 =

1992 Cholera outbreak

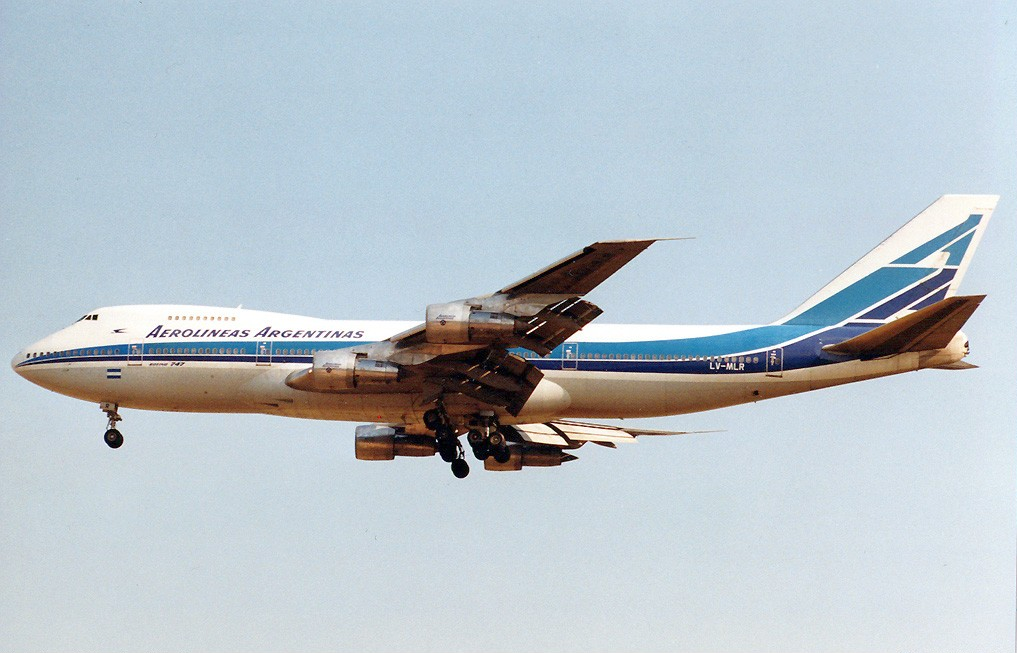
- A Boeing 747-200B of Aerolíneas Argentinas similar to the aircraft involved

Occurrence
- Date: 14 February 1992
- Summary: Mass foodborne illness outbreak by cholera from airline meal
- Site: In flight from Lima, Peru to Los Angeles, United States

Aircraft
- Aircraft type: Boeing 747-200B
- Operator: Aerolíneas Argentinas
- Flight origin: Ministro Pistarini International Airport, Buenos Aires, Argentina
- Stopover: Jorge Chávez International Airport, Lima, Peru
- Destination: Los Angeles International Airport, Los Angeles, United States
- Occupants: 356
- Passengers: 336
- Crew: 20
- Fatalities: 1
- Injuries: 75
- Survivors: 355

On 14 February 1992, food contaminated with cholera was distributed to the passengers on Aerolíneas Argentinas Flight 386, operated by a Boeing 747-200. One of the passengers died from the illness.

== Description ==
On 14 February 1992, an Aerolineas Argentinas Boeing 747-287B, arrived in Los Angeles, California, United States, inbound from Ministro Pistarini International Airport, Buenos Aires, Argentina, via a scheduled stopover at Jorge Chávez International Airport, Lima, Peru. There were 336 passengers and 20 crew members on board the Lima–Los Angeles leg of the flight. Out of the 336 passengers, the United States was the final destination for 297 of them. Two passengers had Canada as their final destination, while 37 travelled to Japan.

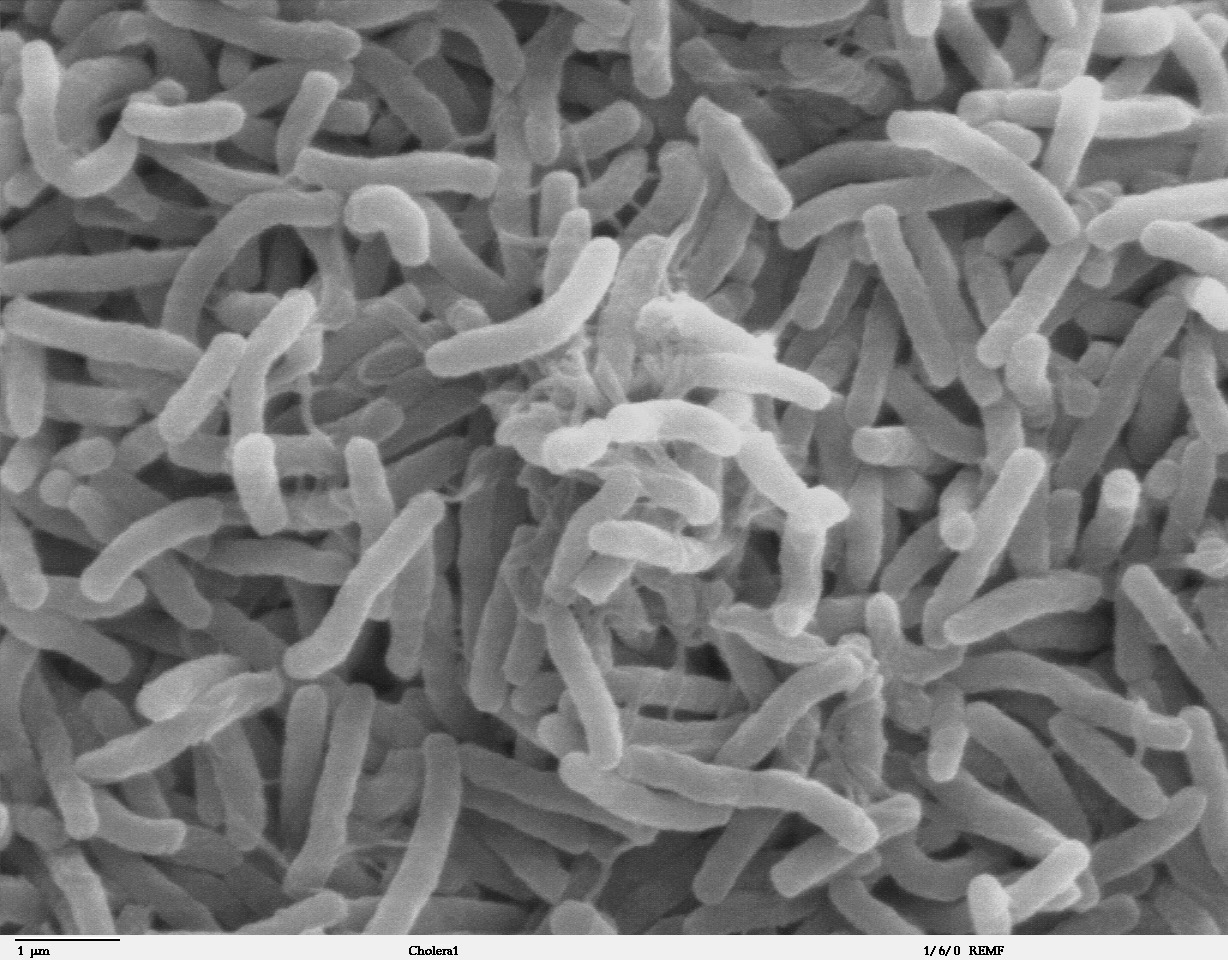
Vibrio cholerae: The bacterium that causes cholera (SEM image)

Contaminated shrimp entered the aircraft in Lima, a year after a cholera outbreak began in Peru. Five passengers showed signs of the illness immediately after landing at Los Angeles International Airport. Several days later that number rose to 76. One of them, a man in his early seventies, died from the illness. The cholera on the contaminated food did not spread to other areas within the United States.

Even though the Peruvian caterer that provided the food to Aerolíneas Argentinas in Lima also provided service to other companies the same day and no signs of the illness were reported, Aerolíneas Argentinas blamed it for entering the contaminated food into the aircraft. This led to a controversy that eventually ended with the airline banned from operating into Peruvian territory.

== Investigation and subsequent developments ==
An investigation by the Food and Drug Administration highlighted the problem patchwork of regulations for food safety.

The International Civil Aviation Organization (ICAO) stated that the responsibility for the safety of the operator organization is not changed by subcontracting of catering or other services to third parties.

In 1995, the World Health Organization in consultation with the ICAO and the International Maritime Organization developed explicit agreements on the management of transmission risks for cholera and other infectious diseases by air and sea. In 1998 this led to improvements in aircraft disinfection procedures.

The ICAO now takes the advice of the International Travel Catering Association.

== See also ==
- Japan Air Lines food poisoning incident
- Aerolíneas Argentinas accidents and incidents
- Foodborne illness
