= Jon Andrus =

American physician

Jon Andrus, an American physician, epidemiologist and immunization specialist, is the former deputy director of the Pan American Health Organization (PAHO).

== Education and career ==
Andrus obtained a Bachelor of Science from Stanford University (Biologic Science), a medical doctor degree from the UC Davis School of Medicine, and has completed his residencies in family medicine at the University of California, San Francisco (Family Practice) and preventive medicine at the Centers for Disease Control and Prevention. He is also a graduate of the Centers for Disease Control and Prevention's Epidemic Intelligence Service.

Andrus is the director, Division of Vaccines and Immunizations, is adjoint professor of family medicine and pediatrics, Section of Pediatric Infectious Disease, School of Medicine and adjunct professor of Epidemiology at the Colorado School of Public Health, University of Colorado Anschutz Medical Campus. Based at the center's Washington, D.C., office, Andrus leads the University of Colorado's efforts to advocate for the evidence-based use of life-saving vaccines in the world's poorest communities. Jon has more than 30 years of experience working in global health at all levels of the health system.

Currently, Andrus is also adjunct professor of Global Health at the Department of Global Health, the Milken Institute School of Public Health of George Washington University where he teaches a course on global vaccinology. Andrus also holds a faculty appointment at the University of California, San Francisco.

Andrus has served as a deputy director at the Pan American Health Organization (PAHO). At PAHO, among several duties, he oversaw departments of Emergency Preparedness and Disaster Relief; and Knowledge Management and Communication. Prior to that, he was the lead technical advisor for PAHO's immunization program, providing oversight and guidance for PAHO's technical cooperation to member countries. He also served as polio focal point for polio eradication in Southeast Asia and regional advisor for immunization during the 1990s.

He began his global health career in 1985 as a Peace Corps volunteer, serving as a district medical officer in Malawi and has since held positions in the U.S. Centers for Disease Control's (CDC) Global Immunization Division, as head of the Vaccinology and Immunization Program at the Institute for Global Health at the Universities of California at San Francisco and Berkeley, and as director and professor of the Global Health MPH Program at George Washington University.

Currently Andrus is the co-chair of the Global Polio Partners Group, chair of the PAHO's Regional Committee for Monitoring the Sustainability of Measles and Rubella Elimination in the Americas, and a member of the Independent Monitoring Board for the Polio Transition. Andrus serves on other World Health Organization (WHO) advisory committees, including PAHO's Technical Advisory Group for Vaccine Preventable Diseases, and WHO's South East Asia Regional Verification Commission for Measles and Rubella Elimination.

Andrus has published more than 120 scientific peer-reviewed papers on topics covering disease eradication, the introduction of new vaccines and primary care. He has received numerous awards, including: the 2016 the Presidential Citation of the Society for Public Health Education in recognition and gratitude for contributions to the Society for Public Health Education's textbook, Introduction to Global Health Promotion; the 2013 Transformational Leadership Award of the University of California; the 2011 Global Leadership Award of the Pneumococcal Awareness Council of Experts, and the 2000 Distinguished Service Medal, the highest award of United States Public Health Service, for leadership in polio eradication in South-East Asia., In 1982, Andrus was given the John Driscoll, M.D. Award given to the outstanding graduating Family Practice Resident for service and teaching at the Santa Rosa Family Practice Program of University California San Francisco. The ministries of health of El Salvador, Ecuador, Paraguay, and Peru have awarded Andrus for his contributions to immunization services in countries of Latin America. He has received numerous other awards for his leadership in the eradication of measles, rubella and congenital rubella syndrome, as well as the introduction of new vaccines in developing countries.

== Other activities ==
- Global Polio Eradication Initiative, co-chair of the Global Polio Partners Group (PPG)
- Global Polio Eradication Initiative, member of the Polio Transition Independent Monitoring Board (TIMB)
- Pan American Health Organization, chair of the Regional Committee for Monitoring the Sustainability of Measles and Rubella Elimination in the Americas
- Pan American Health Organization, member of the Technical Advisory Group for Vaccine-Preventable Diseases.
- World Health Organization, member of the South East Asia Regional Verification Commission for Measles and Rubella Elimination
