= Phage typing =

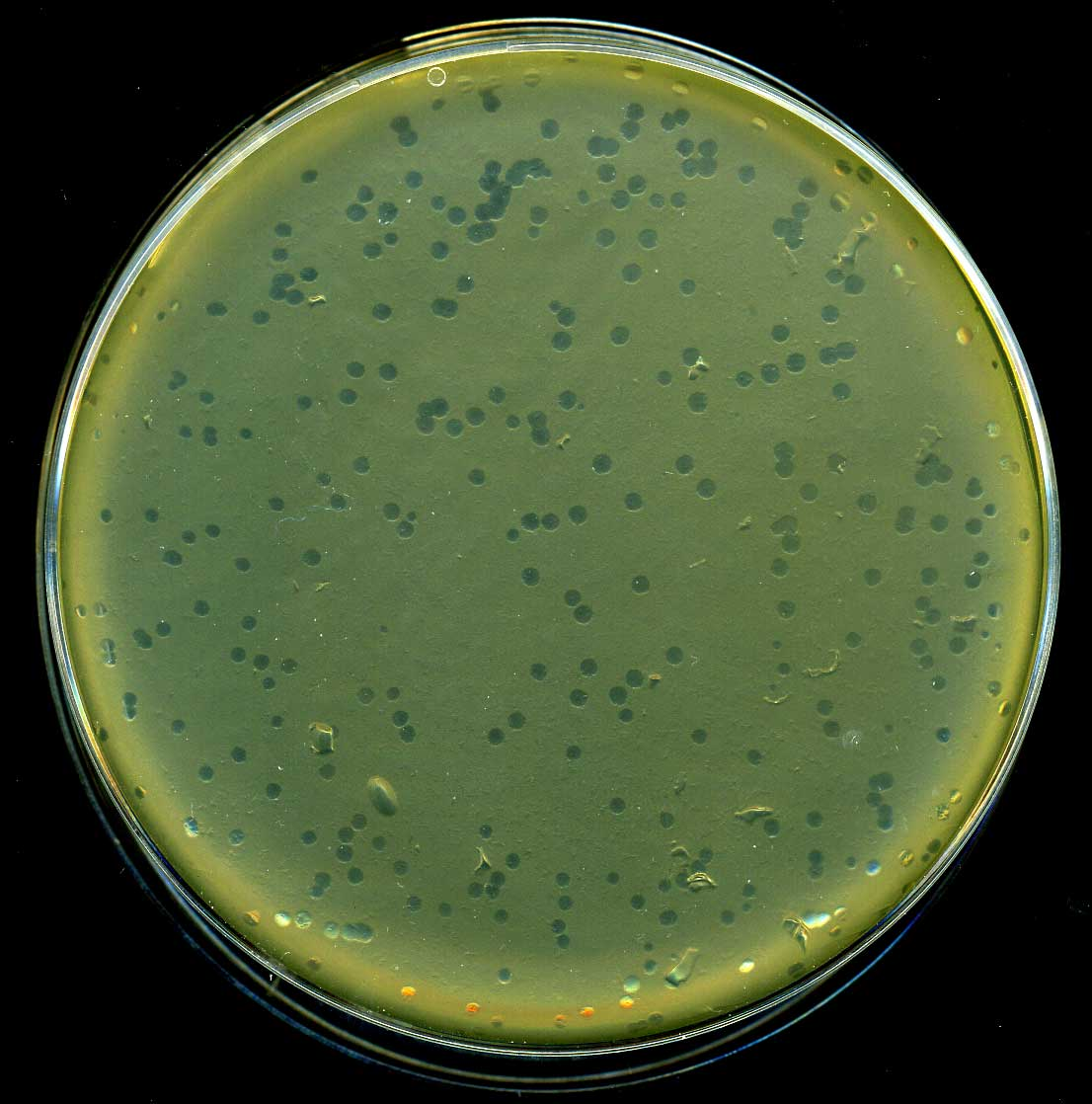
A culture of bacteria infected by bacteriophages, the "holes" are areas where the bacteria have been killed by the virus. The culture is 10cm in diameter.

Phage typing is a phenotypic method that uses bacteriophages ("phages" for short) for detecting and identifying single strains of bacteria. Phages are viruses that infect bacteria and may lead to bacterial cell lysis. The bacterial strain is assigned a type based on its lysis pattern. Phage typing was used to trace the source of infectious outbreaks throughout the 1900s, but it has been replaced by genotypic methods such as whole genome sequencing for epidemiological characterization.

== Principle ==
Phage typing is based on the specific binding of phages to antigens and receptors on the surface of bacteria and the resulting bacterial lysis or lack thereof. The binding process is known as adsorption. Once a phage adsorbs to the surface of a bacteria, it may undergo either the lytic cycle or the lysogenic cycle.

Virulent phages enter the lytic cycle where they replicate and lyse the bacterial cell. Virulent phages can differentiate between different species of bacteria based on their specific lytic action. Lysis will only occur if the virulent phage adsorbs to the bacterial surface, configuring species specificity to phages.

Temperate phages enter the lysogenic cycle and do not immediately lyse the cell. The phage is instead integrated into the bacterial genome as a prophage during lysogenization, which protects the cell from being lysed by phages which are serologically identical or related. Since it is incorporated into the genome, the prophage is also passed down to the bacteria's progenies. The bacterial strain carrying the prophage is known as a lysogenic strain. Lysogenization is strain-specific, so it allows for differentiation among different strains of bacteria within the same species. The prophage may be chemically or physically induced to revert to the lytic pathway.

== Method ==
The bacterial strain to be characterized is cultured on an agar Petri dish and dried. Once dry, a grid or another recognizable pattern is drawn on the base to mark out different regions. Each region is inoculated with a different phage at its routine test dilution and then incubated for 5-48 hours. The susceptible phage regions will display a clearing where the bacteria have been lysed, and this is used in differentiation. The size, morphology, and pattern of the lysed region are important criteria for differentiating bacterial species and strains. They are compared against a standard scheme of lysis patterns to assign a type to the strain.

=== Routine Test Dilution (RTD) ===
Routine test dilution (RTD) is typically defined as the lowest phage dilution that still yields lysis of its host. This technique prevents a phenomenon known as "lysis from without", which is bacterial lysis induced by high multiplicity phage adsorption rather than phage replication.

== History ==
The first reported use of bacteriophages to identify bacteria was in 1925 when Sonnenschein used typhoid and paratyphoid phages to diagnose typhoid. In 1934, it was discovered that some strains of Salmonella typhi displayed Vi antigens on the surface. This led to the isolation of Vi phages capable of lysing typhoid bacteria strains but only if they displayed the Vi antigen enabling the differentiation of typhoid species expressing the Vi antigen and those which do not.

In 1938, Craigie and Yen adapted Vi phages by selective propagation and used them at their critical test dilutions to differentiate 11 types of B. typhosus. In 1943, Felix and Callow extended the method to Salmonella paratyphi B. in 1943 and differentiated 12 types with 11 phages. The International Committee for Enteric Phage Typing was established in 1947, and these phage typing methods were soon standardized.

Improvements to the specificity of phage typing schemes were made throughout the next few decades. In 1959, Callow improved her initial scheme to differentiate 34 types of Salmonella typhimurium with 29 phages. In 1977, this was extended to 207 types by Anderson at the Enteric Reference Laboratory in London. Since then, phage typing schemes have been developed for Salmonella typhi, Salmonella paratyphi B., Salmonella typhimurium, Shigella sonnei, Staphylococcus aureus, and Escherichia coli to name a few.

== Limitations ==
Phage typing requires the use of a comprehensive number of phages, so it is typically only used in reference laboratories. It also relies on the interpretation of the individual lysis pattern and comparison to a standard which has led to conflicting results from different laboratories in the past. Furthermore, bacteriophages mutate so reference phages must be maintained.

== Phage Isolation ==
Phages used for phage typing are generally isolated from the native habitats of the host bacterial strain. These may include sewage, feces, soil, and water. Temperate phages may be isolated from the bacterium itself since it is incorporated into the bacterial genome during lysogenization.
