= Dayton Veterans Affairs Medical Center =

- National Home for Disabled Volunteer Soldiers, Central Branch
- U.S. National Register of Historic Places
- U.S. National Historic Landmark District
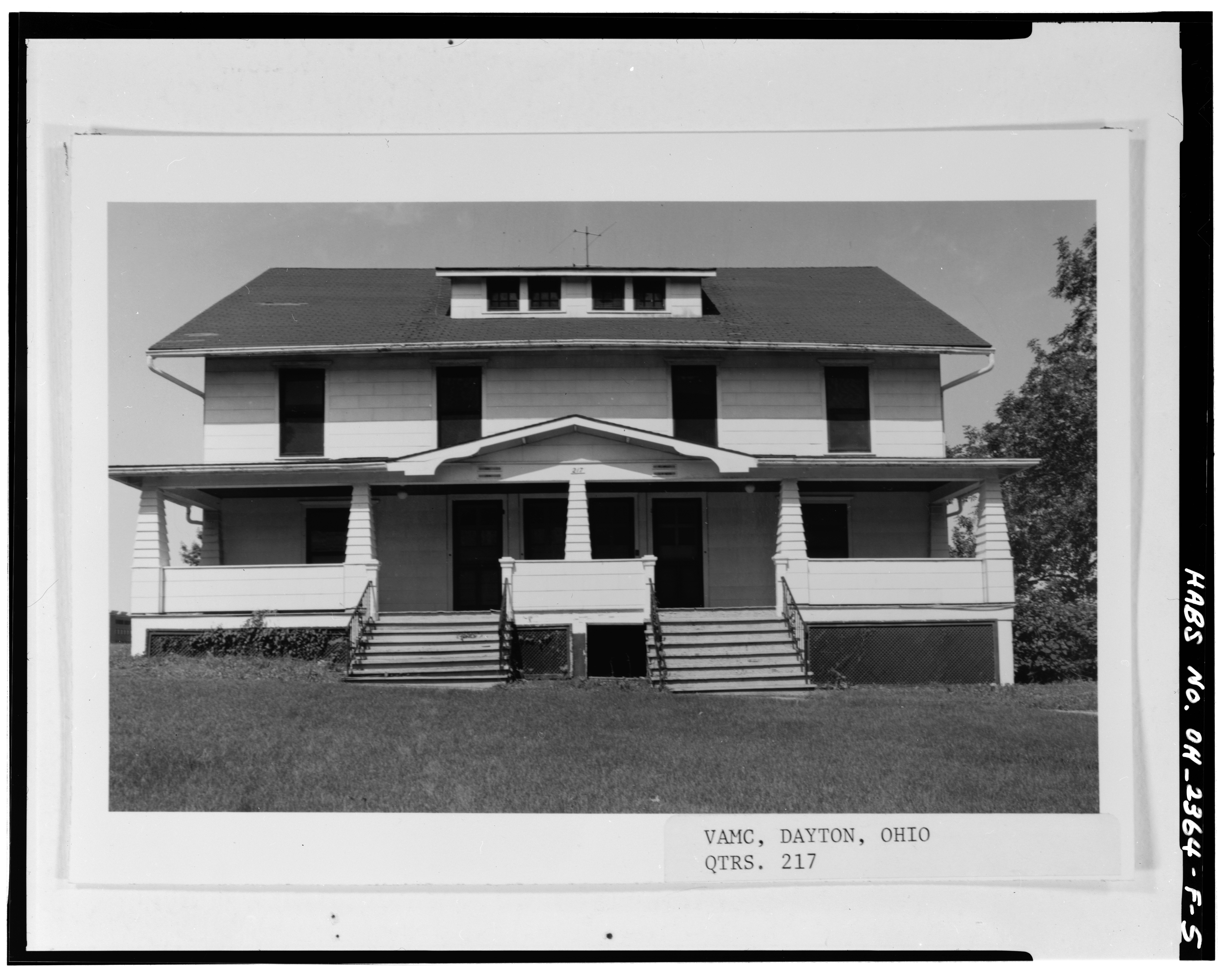
- A four-unit residence building at the center (undated HABS photo)

- Location within Ohio Location within the United States
- Location: 4100 W. 3rd St., Dayton, Ohio
- Coordinates: 39°44′37″N 84°15′55″W
- Area: 578.87 acres (234.26 ha) (size in 1930); 266 acres (108 ha) (landmark-designated area)
- Built: 1867
- NRHP reference No.: 03001412

Significant dates
- Added to NRHP: January 15, 2004
- Designated NHLD: October 16, 2012

The Dayton Veterans Affairs Medical Center is located at 4100 West 3rd Street in Dayton, Ohio. Founded in 1867, it is one of the three oldest facilities of what is now the United States Department of Veterans Affairs. When founded, it was known as the Central Branch of the National Home for Disabled Volunteer Soldiers, and it is under this name that a portion of its campus, along with the adjacent Dayton National Cemetery, was designated a National Historic Landmark District in 2012, for its role in the history and management of veterans affairs.

== Campus ==
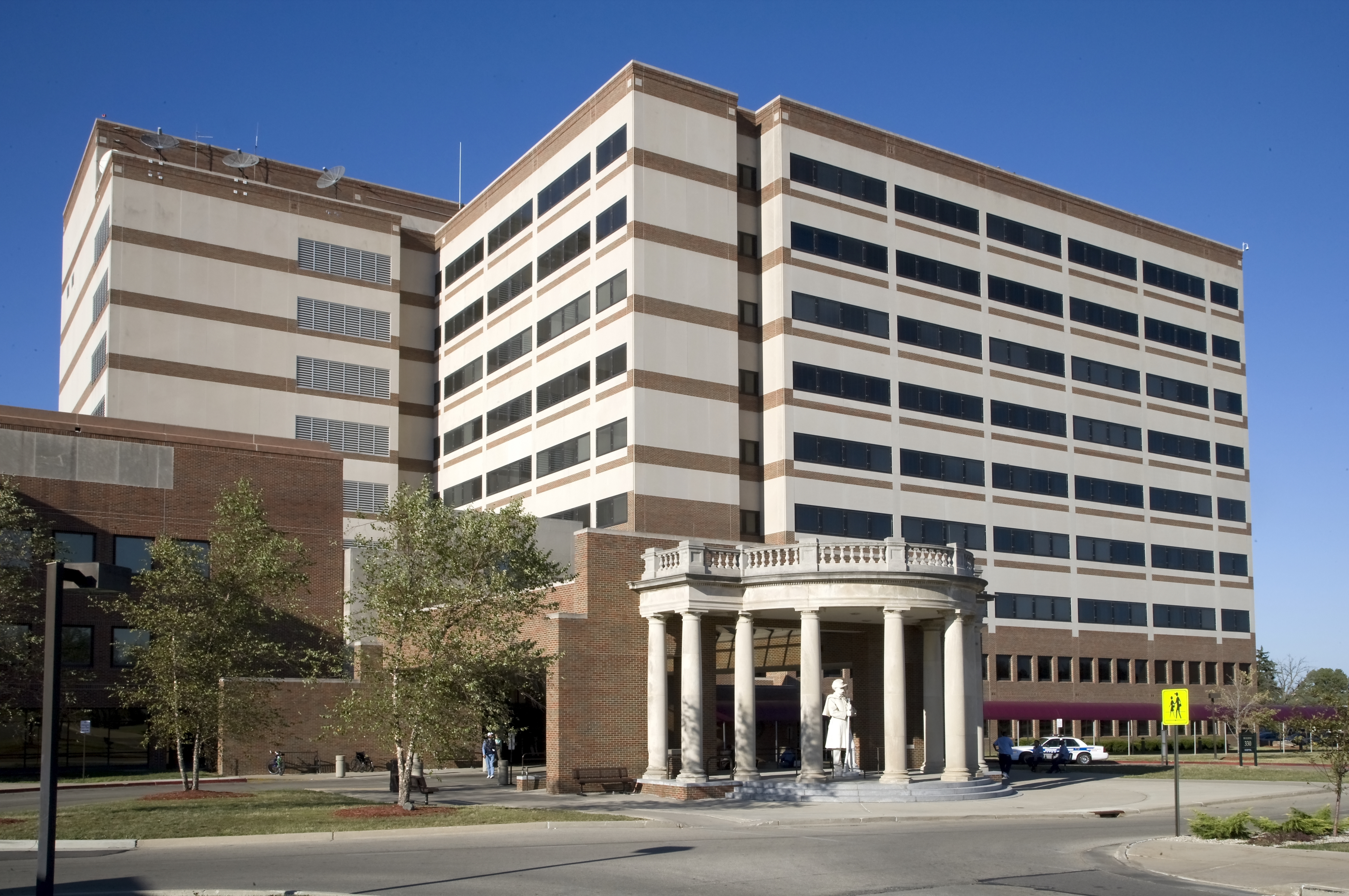
The medical center in September 2008.

The Dayton VA campus is located on Dayton's west side, bounded on the north by Dayton National Cemetery (itself bounded on the north by West 3rd Street), the east by South Gettysburg Avenue, the south by United States Route 35, and on the west by Liscum Drive. The expansive property includes a large number of buildings, most of which were built between about 1930 and 1960 to fulfill the VA's mission in a variety of ways. They include administrative facilities, hospital and other medical facilities, housing complexes (some still in use as such, others used for other purposes, and others standing vacant), and landscaped grounds. A small handful of buildings remain from its earliest days.

== History ==
In 1866 the United States Congress established the National Home for Disabled Volunteer Soldiers (NHDVS), the precursor of the VA, to provide medical and other facilities for veterans of the American Civil War. Three centers were established in the following years: the Eastern branch in Togus, Maine, the Central Branch in Dayton, and the Northwestern Branch in Milwaukee, Wisconsin. The Dayton facility was the administrative center of the home, and its principal commissary. The landscaped grounds of its early days included a conservatory and a small zoo, which were local tourist attractions in addition to providing restorative functions to veterans living at the facility. In 1930 the NHDVS was merged with other organizations to form the Veterans Administration, and the Dayton facilities underwent a major modernization over the following 20 years. The facilities were expanded and further modernizes in the 1980s and 1990s, most visibly with the construction of the Inpatient Tower and associated medical complex, which now dominate the western portion of the campus.

A portion of the complex, including the adjacent cemetery (also founded in 1867), was listed on the National Register of Historic Places in 2004 for its significance in local and state history, and was designated a National Historic Landmark in 2012 for its national importance in the administration of veterans affairs.

== National VA History Center ==
It was announced in 2016 that the National VA History Center was to be established on the site and the VA's national archives to be moved there. A plan to renovate a former headquarters building and a former clubhouse was revealed the following year.

A bill to permanently locate the center in Dayton was put before the United States Congress in January 2024. In winter 2025-2026, the headquarters was removed from the proposal and a decision was made to construct a purpose built building. Legislation to formally establish a corresponding history office inside the VA was introduced in May 2026.

== See also ==
- List of National Historic Landmarks in Ohio
- National Register of Historic Places listings in Dayton, Ohio
- List of Veterans Affairs medical facilities
