= Kenneth N. Beers =

NASA flight surgeon

Kenneth N. Beers was an American medical doctor who served as a NASA flight surgeon during the Project Gemini and Apollo Program eras. Beers died on September 20, 2017.

== Education ==
Beers did his undergraduate work at Muhlenberg College. In 1956, Dr. Beers graduated from Jefferson Medical College of Thomas Jefferson University. On September 20, 1962, he received his California medical license.

== Organizations ==
Beers was president of the Society of NASA Flight Engineers.

== Career ==
Beers was professor emeritus at the Wright State University medical school.
