= Harold P. Freeman =

American physician (1933–2026)

- Born: Harold Paul Freeman; March 2, 1933; Washington, D.C., U.S.
- Died: August 11, 2026 (aged 93); Atlanta, Georgia, U.S.
- Education: Catholic University of America; Howard University College of Medicine; Dunbar High School
- Employer(s): Ralph Lauren Center for Cancer Care and Prevention; Columbia University College of Physicians and Surgeons; Harlem Hospital Center; National Cancer Institute; North General Hospital
- Awards: Fellow of the American College of Surgeons

Harold Paul Freeman (March 2, 1933 – August 11, 2026) was an American physician. He was an authority on race, poverty and cancer. In his work in Harlem, Freeman identified the impact of poverty and cultural barriers on rates of cancer incidence and cancer-related death, in economically disadvantaged and under-served communities. He also pioneered Patient Navigation (or nurse navigation) in the field of breast cancer. In navigation programs, trained personnel work with patients to identify and overcome barriers to their obtaining timely treatment as they move through the medical system.

Freeman was a Fellow of the American College of Surgeons and a member of the National Academy of Science's Institute of Medicine. He served as President of the American Cancer Society from 1988 to 1989, leading the society's initiative on Cancer in the Poor. Freeman has argued for the involvement of scientists in policy formation. His work led to the passage of the Patient Navigator Outreach and Chronic Disease Prevention Act (H.R. 1812) of 2005, and to the creation of billing codes for patient navigation services in Medicare and Medicaid Services as of 2024.

== Early life and education ==
Harold Paul Freeman was born on March 2, 1933, in Washington, D.C., to Clyde and Lucille Thomas Freeman. The family name Freeman was chosen by his great-great-grandfather who bought himself free from slavery on a North Carolina plantation. The Freeman family has a history of educational achievement in medical fields. Harold Freeman's great-granduncle, Robert Tanner Freeman, was the first African-American dentist in the United States, graduating from Harvard in 1869. His grandfather, Henry W. Freeman, graduated from Howard University Medical School in 1898 and became a doctor in Washington, D.C.

Harold's father, Clyde Freeman, took night classes to put himself through law school. His mother Lucille was a teacher. Clyde died of testicular cancer when Harold was only 13 years of age. Despite this, Harold completed his high school education at Dunbar High School, then an academically elite but segregated institution in Washington, D.C.

Freeman's parents had met on a tennis court. Coached by their mother Lucille, Harold and his older brothers Thomas and Clyde all became national boys tennis champions. Harold was boys' champion in 1948, at age 15. Harold and Clyde won the national tennis doubles championship on the adult African American tennis circuit in 1955. Harold also played in the U.S. Open in subsequent years.

Freeman won an academic scholarship to Catholic University of America where "Hal" Freeman is listed as playing both tennis and basketball. He was chosen as team captain of both in his senior year. Freeman graduated from Catholic University in the class of 1954, with the Harris Award for Outstanding Scholar, Gentleman, and Athlete. In 1978, he received a Distinguished Alumni Achievement Award from Catholic University. In 1992, he was inducted into the university's Athletes Hall of Fame.

He went on to study medicine at Howard University Medical School in Washington, D.C., also a historically Black school. There Freeman studied with Burke Syphax and was inspired by LaSalle D. Leffall Jr. and Jack E. White. Freeman received his medical degree in 1958, completing both his internship and residency at Howard. The school awarded him the Daniel Hale Williams Award for Outstanding Achievements as Chief Resident.

In 1964, Freeman accepted an advanced residency position at Memorial Sloan Kettering Cancer Center (MSK) where he worked with Arthur Holleb. From 1966 to 1968, he was Senior Resident in Cancer Surgery at MSK.

== Career ==
External videos
- Harold Freeman, C-SPAN Network

In 1967, Freeman joined Harlem Hospital Center. The patients he saw there were overwhelmingly poor and black, and most of his cancer patients had advanced stage cancers. He began to investigate the incidence and treatment of cancer in African Americans. By 1974, he had opened a free clinic, held on Saturdays, to improve accessibility for patients. This later officially become part of the hospital system. Freeman served as professor of clinical surgery at Harlem Hospital from 1974 to 1999.

In 1977, at hearings convened by New York City governor Hugh Carey, Freeman criticized the American Cancer Society for their lack of involvement in areas like Harlem. The board of directors of the American Cancer Society responded by inviting Freeman to become a director at large in 1978. He succeeded LaSalle D. Leffall as chairman of the ACS committee dealing with Cancer in Minorities.

In 1979, the American Cancer Society (ACS) gave Freeman a grant to establish screening centers for breast and cervical cancer in Harlem. He established the Breast Examination Center of Harlem, becoming its Medical Director. His publication Cancer in the Economically Disadvantaged (1989) is considered a "landmark report", connecting poverty and mortality. In Excess Mortality in Harlem (1990), Freeman and Colin McCord documented the lower lifespan of African American males in Harlem, which was less than that of males in Bangladesh. Mortality rates for men and women in some age categories were up to six times those of white men and women of similar age nationally.

As President of the American Cancer Society (1988-1989), Freeman held nation-wide hearings that examined economic, educational and socio-cultural factors and their effects on access to care, explaining the higher incidence and mortality of cancer to be found in under-served populations in terms of interlinking conditions of poverty, social injustice, and culture. In 1990, the ACS established the Harold P. Freeman Service Award to recognize those working with underserved communities at risk for cancer.

Freeman pioneered the concept of patient navigation (also known as nurse navigation), in which trained individuals work consistently with patients and their families throughout their experience of the medical system. Patient navigators work to identify and overcome barriers to timely treatment, to ensure that patients are able to get the full continuum of care that is needed. Barriers include financial issues, lack of insurance, difficulty in getting time off from work, access to transportation and child-care, difficulties in language and communication, fear, distress, and the complex and often disconnected nature of the healthcare system itself. In 1990, the ACS funded Freeman's pilot program for patient navigation in Harlem Hospital.

"Navigation as a profession began in breast cancer with the work of Harold P. Freeman, MD. Dr Freeman worked to identify and remove barriers to care for a community of women in need of breast cancer screening. The idea of 'navigating' patients around those barriers in hope of impacting and improving patient outcomes resonated with the oncology community, and the term 'patient navigation' was born." - Lillie Shockney, 2018

Freeman became a professor of clinical surgery at Columbia University College for Physicians and Surgeons as of 1989. He was President and CEO of New York's North General Hospital from 1999 to 2001.

Freeman served as chairman of the United States President's Cancer Panel from 1991 to 2000. He was first appointed by President George H. W. Bush and reappointed three times by President Bill Clinton. President George W. Bush signed the Patient Navigator Outreach and Chronic Disease Prevention Act (H.R. 1812) into law on June 29, 2005. The initiative was based on Freeman's success with the patient navigator program in Harlem.

Freeman served as an Associate Director of the National Cancer Institute (NCI). From 2000 to 2005, Freeman served as the founding Director of the Center for Reducing Cancer Health Disparities, which replaced the NCI Office of Special Populations Research. Freeman emphasized the need to advocate for policy changes based on research, in addition to the organization's work in education and communication.

“We believe that we need to have the ability to raise reasonable questions that we believe should be answered, and which have the potential of calling in the best minds in the world to help us to come to some answers,” Harold Freeman, 2000

As of 2003, Freeman became founding president and medical director of the Ralph Lauren Center for Cancer Care and Prevention in Harlem. He continued to be chairman emeritus of the organization.

As of June 2007, with funding from the Amgen Foundation, the Harold P. Freeman Patient Navigation Institute was established in New York City. Freeman was its founder, president, and CEO. The Harold P. Freeman Patient Navigation Institute runs training programs in patient navigation for nurses and others. In addition to cancer, the program has been applied to the management of infectious diseases and chronic conditions like diabetes, heart disease, and mental health. Patient navigation has been included in the accreditation standards of the American College of Surgeons for hospital cancer programs.

As of 2024, the Centers for Medicare and Medicaid Services created billing codes to enable health care providers to fill for “patient navigation” services, under President Joe Biden’s Cancer Moonshot initiative.

== Death ==
Freeman died in Atlanta on August 11, 2026, at the age of 93.

== Awards and honors ==
- Fellow, American College of Surgeons
- Fellow, American Surgical Association
- 1988–1989, President, American Cancer Society
- 1997, Elected member, National Academy of Science's Institute of Medicine
- 2000, Mary Lasker Award for Public Service, National Institutes of Health (NIH)
- 2000, Medal of Honor Award, American Cancer Society
- 2001, CDC Foundation Champion of Prevention Award, Centers for Disease Control and Prevention
- 2003, Special Recognition Award, American Society of Clinical Oncology
- 2004, Rudin Prize, GNYHA Foundation
- 2004, Robert F. Allen Symbol of H.O.P.E. Award. American Journal of Health Promotion (AJHP)
- 2015, Giants of Cancer Care Award, Onclive
- 2017, The Cura Personalis Award, Georgetown University Medical Center

== Selected publications ==
- Freeman, H. P. (September 1, 1989). "Cancer in the Socioeconomically Disadvantaged". CA: A Cancer Journal for Clinicians. 39 (5): 266–288. doi:10.3322/canjclin.39.5.266. ISSN 0007-9235. PMID 2513099. (modified version of Cancer in the Economically Disadvantaged, 1989)
- McCord, Colin; Freeman, Harold P. (January 18, 1990). "Excess Mortality in Harlem". New England Journal of Medicine. 322 (3): 173–177. doi:10.1056/NEJM199001183220306. ISSN 0028-4793.
- Freeman, Harold P. (1991). President's Cancer Panel : Report of the Chairman (PDF). National Institutes of Health. Archived from the original (PDF) on January 22, 2022.
- Freeman, HP; Muth, BJ; Kerner, JF (January 1995). "Expanding access to cancer screening and clinical follow-up among the medically underserved". Cancer Practice. 3 (1): 19–30. PMID 7704057.
- Freeman, H. P. (March 1, 2004). "Poverty, Culture, and Social Injustice: Determinants of Cancer Disparities". CA: A Cancer Journal for Clinicians. 54 (2): 72–77. doi:10.3322/canjclin.54.2.72. ISSN 0007-9235. PMID 15061597.
- Freeman, Harold P. (September 2004). "A Model Patient Navigation Program: Breaking down Barriers to Ensure That All Individuals with Cancer Receive Timely Diagnosis and Treatment". Oncology Issues. 19 (5): 44–46. doi:10.1080/10463356.2004.11884227.
- Freeman, HP; Rodriguez, RL (August 2011). "History and principles of patient navigation". Cancer. 117 (15 Suppl): 3539–42. doi:10.1002/cncr.26262. PMC 4557777. PMID 21780088.
