= Sandi Lam =

Canadian pediatric neurosurgeon

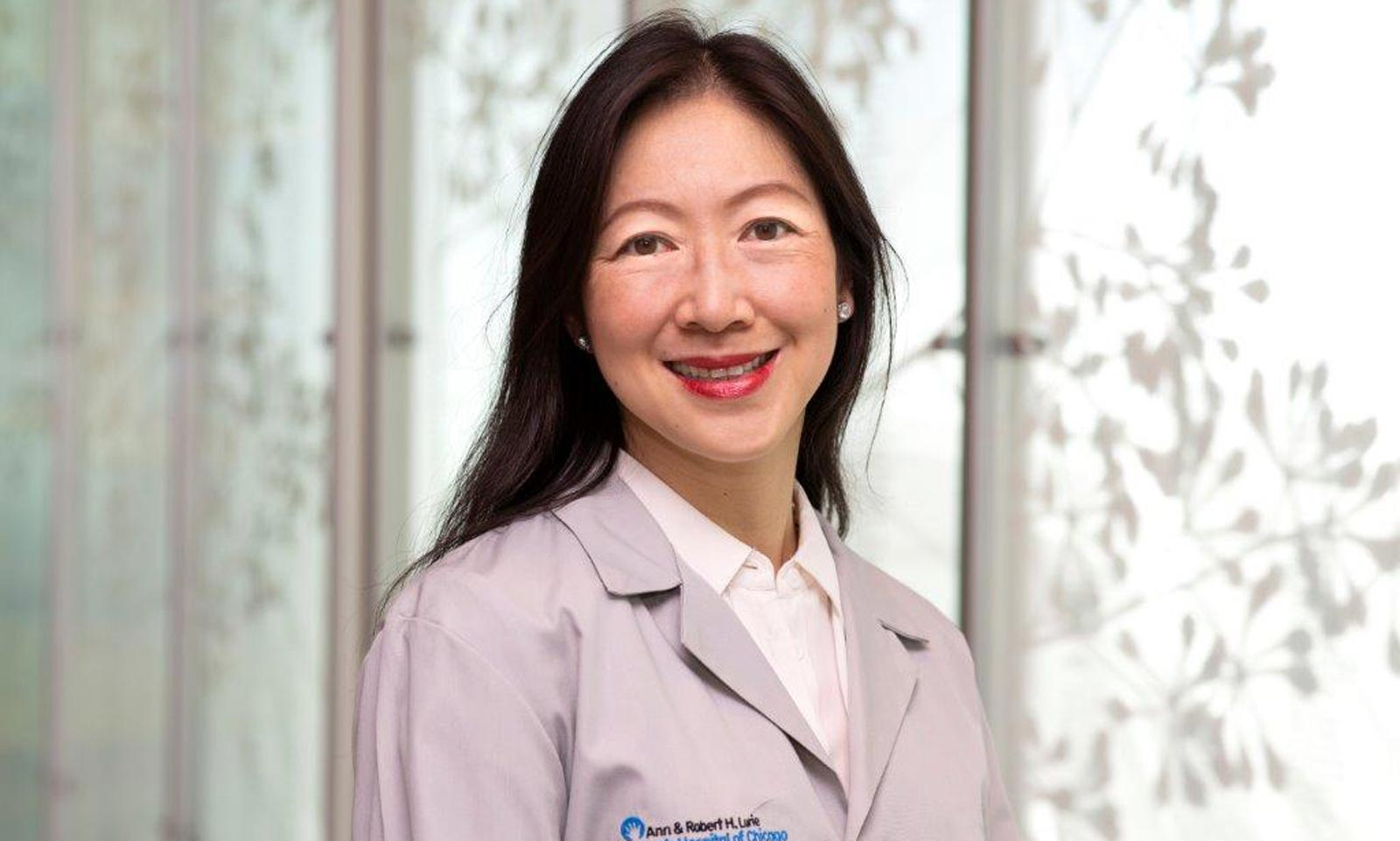
- Born: Hong Kong
- Education: Northwestern University Feinberg School of Medicine; University of California, Los Angeles Medical Center; Children's Hospital of Pittsburgh
- Known for: neuroendoscopy minimally invasive surgery global health
- Awards: 2015 Health Policy Scholar, American Association of Neurological Surgeons /American College of Surgeons
- Scientific career
- Fields: Pediatric Neurosurgery
- Workplaces: Northwestern University Feinberg School of Medicine; Texas Children's Hospital; University of Chicago

Sandi Lam is a Canadian pediatric neurosurgeon and is known for her research in minimally invasive endoscopic hemispherectomy for patients with epilepsy. Lam is the Vice Chair for Pediatric Neurological Surgery at Northwestern University and the Division Chief of Pediatric Neurosurgery at Lurie Children's Hospital. She has spent her career advancing pediatric brain surgery capabilities globally through her work in Kenya performing surgeries as well as training and mentoring local residents and fellows.

== Early life and education ==
Lam was born in Hong Kong, and subsequently moved to Toronto, Canada for high school. She attended the University of Toronto Schools for high school and was a student athlete. After high school in Canada, she began her undergraduate degree at Northwestern University in 1994 obtaining a B.A. in biology. She remained at Northwestern University to pursue her medical degree at Feinberg School of Medicine from 1998 to 2002. After graduating from medical school, Lam then decided to pursue a residency in orthopedic surgery, and began her residency training at University of California, Los Angeles in 2002. By 2004, Lam shifted her path towards neurosurgery and began her fellowship in neurosurgery at UCLA. After her neurosurgery training in 2009, Lam began to specialize in pediatric neurosurgery and pursued her fellowship training in pediatric neurosurgery at the Children's Hospital of Pittsburgh. Lam completed her fellowship in 2011, and during this time also obtained her M.B.A. at George Washington University School of Business.

== Career and research ==
In 2011, Lam began a faculty position at the University of Chicago where she served as an assistant professor of neurosurgery. By 2013, Lam was recruited to Texas Children's Hospital where she served as an assistant professor in the Department of Neurosurgery at Baylor College of Medicine. Lam also co-directed the Craniofacial Clinic and joined the Texas Children's Epilepsy Team. She also held a leadership position in the Center for Ethics and Health Policy at Baylor College of Medicine. In 2019, Lam was recruited back to her alma mater, Northwestern University, where she became a tenured professor in the Department of Neurosurgery as well as the Division Chief of Pediatric Neurosurgery at Lurie Children's Hospital at Northwestern. In 2021, she became the Pediatric Neurosurgery Fellowship Director. Lam has been a member at large with the American Association of Neurological Surgeons since 2020.

=== Minimally invasive endoscopic hemispherectomy and corpus callosotomy ===
Lam's clinical research focus encompasses pediatric epilepsy surgery and cerebrovascular surgery. She specifically has expertise in surgical innovation in the areas of neuroendoscopy, minimally invasive surgical techniques, and has helped create multidisciplinary patient-centered clinical programs. Her research in neuroendoscopy has led to new surgical treatments for patients with intractable epilepsy to have less invasive procedures. Lam has recently developed a new approach to minimally invasive endoscope assisted hemispherectomy and corpus callosotomy for pediatric patients with epilepsy.

=== Health care economics and global health ===
Lam's research program is based on health services research, quality improvement, and data analytics to understand and improve health care utilization and delivery. She conducts comparative effectiveness research for the treatment of epilepsy with a focus on health policy and advocacy for improvements in pediatric health care and access.

Since 2011, Lam has been participating in yearly global health trips to Africa to contribute to building sustainable global pediatric neurosurgery services and clinical training collaborations in underserved countries. She has also participated in international neurosurgery efforts in Asia. As a neurosurgeon with the Kenya Initiative, founded by Leland Albright and Susan Ferson, Lam focuses on building sustainable surgical training and infrastructure in Kenya to address the epidemic of hydrocephalus.

== Awards and honors ==
2018 – Elected to the editorial board of the Journal of Neurosurgery: Pediatrics

2015–2016 – Faculty Award for Teaching Excellence, Baylor College of Medicine Department of Neurosurgery

2015 – Health Policy Scholar, American Association of Neurological Surgeons /American College of Surgeons

2014 – Rising Star Award, Faculty Teaching, Baylor College of Medicine Department of Neurosurgery

2002 Alpha Omega Alpha Northwestern Feinberg School of Medicine

== Select publications ==
Zhang L., Hall M., Lam S.K. Hospital costs associated with vagus nerve stimulation and medical treatment in pediatric patients with refractory epilepsy. Epilepsia. 2022 May;63(5):1141–1151. doi: 10.1111/epi.17208. Epub 2022 Mar 13. PMID 35188675.

Li D, Ravindra VM, Lam S.K. Rigid versus flexible neuroendoscopy: a systematic review and meta-analysis of endoscopic third ventriculostomy for the management of pediatric hydrocephalus. J Neurosurg Pediatr. 2021 Jul 23;28(4):439–449. doi: 10.3171/2021.2.PEDS2121. PMID 34298514.

Lam S, Harris D, Rocque BG, Ham SA. Pediatric endoscopic third ventriculostomy: a population-based study. J Neurosurg Pediatr. 2014 Nov;14(5):455-64. doi: 10.3171/2014.8.PEDS13680. Epub 2014 Sep 19. PMID 25238625.

Rocque BG, Amancherla K, Lew SM, Lam S Outcomes of cranioplasty following decompressive craniectomy in the pediatric population. J Neurosurg Pediatr. 2013 Aug;12(2):120-5. doi: 10.3171/2013.4.PEDS12605. Epub 2013 Jun 21. PMID 23790219.
