= Alexa Canady =

Medical doctor specializing in neurosurgery (born 1950)

Alexa Irene Canady
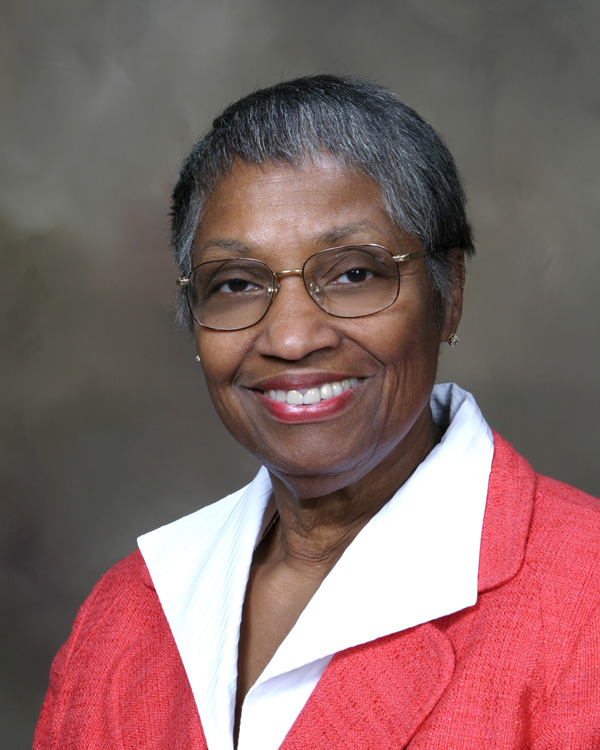
- Canady as featured in the NLM Opening Doors exhibit, 2005
- Born: Alexa Irene Canady; 7 November 1950 (age 76); Lansing, Michigan, U.S.
- Education: University of Michigan (BS, MD)
- Occupations: Neurosurgeon; Medical educator; Researcher
- Years active: 1975–2012
- Known for: First African American woman neurosurgeon
- Awards: Candace Award; Full list

Alexa Irene Canady (born November 7, 1950) is a retired American neurosurgeon, medical educator, and public health advocate. She was the first African American woman in the United States to become board-certified in neurosurgery. In 1987, she was appointed chief of neurosurgery at the Children's Hospital of Michigan, where she served until her retirement in 2001.In addition to her pioneering surgical career, Canady was also a professor at Wayne State University and co-developer of a programmable antisiphon shunt system for the treatment of hydrocephalus.

== Early life and education ==
Alexa Irene Canady was born in Lansing, Michigan in 1950 to Clinton Canady Jr., a dentist, World War II veteran, and graduate of Fisk University and Meharry Medical College. Her mother, Elizabeth Hortense Canady, was an educator and civil rights leader who served as the 18th National President of Delta Sigma Theta Sorority and helped establish the Delta Research and Educational Foundation. Both parents emphasized the importance of perseverance, discipline, and education, values they instilled in Alexa and her younger brother, Clint Canady III.

Despite experiencing racial prejudice as one of the only Black students in her school during her early education, Canady excelled academically and graduated with honors from Lansing Everett High School in 1967, where she was recognized as a National Achievement Scholar.

She enrolled at the University of Michigan and initially majored in mathematics but later switched to zoology, after a period of uncertainty about her academic direction. In order to bring in more money at the time, Canady ended up getting a job for a University Newspaper to be an editor. In 1971, she earned her Bachelor of Science degree and became a member of Delta Sigma Theta. Her junior year summer she attended a genetic counseling clinic, which initially piqued her interest to pursue medicine. During college, her participation in a summer program for minority students in medicine helped solidify her decision to pursue a medical career.

Canady graduated cum laude with her M.D. from the University of Michigan Medical School in 1975 and was inducted into Alpha Omega Alpha, the national medical honor society.

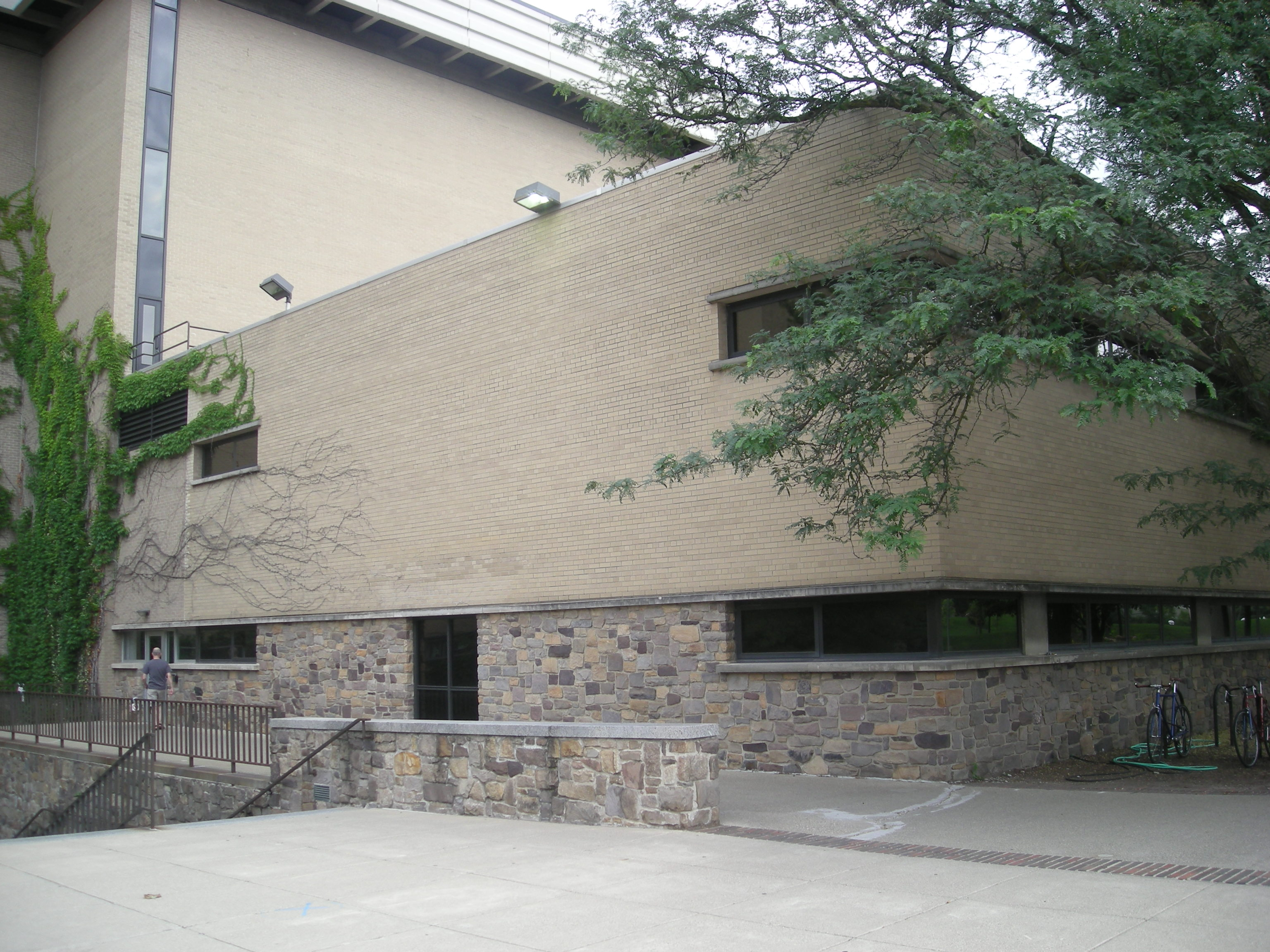
Medical Science Building II and Buhl Research Center, University of Michigan Medical Campus, Ann Arbor

== Career ==
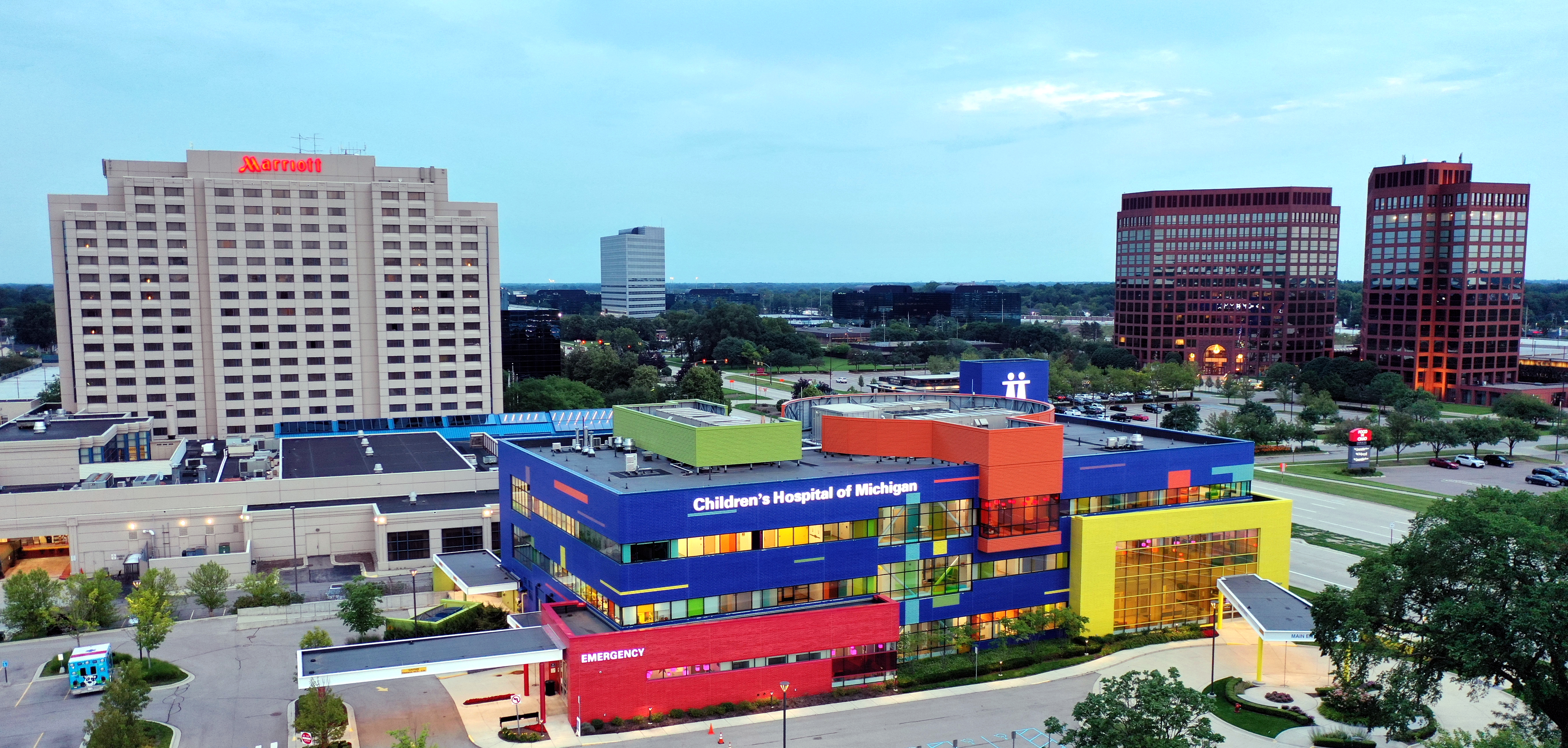
Children’s Hospital of Michigan, Troy campus.

After earning her M.D., Canady began her postgraduate training with a surgical internship at Yale-New Haven Hospital from 1975 to 1976. Initially, Canady experienced hardship in receiving an internship opportunity. Despite facing racial bias—including being dismissed by some as an “equal-opportunity package”—she earned the respect of her colleagues and was voted one of the hospital’s top interns.

She went on to complete her neurosurgical residency at the University of Minnesota in 1981, becoming the first African American woman in the United States to train and qualify in the field of neurosurgery. After completing her residency, Canday worked at the Children's Hospital of Philadelphia from 1981 to 1982, where she was voted by her fellow physicians to be hospital's top resident.

Canady began her professional career at Henry Ford Hospital in Detroit before joining the Children's Hospital of Michigan, where she would make history. In 1984, she became the first African American woman board-certified in neurosurgery.McClelland S 3rd. Alexa Irene Canady: the first African-American woman neurosurgeon. J Natl Med Assoc. 2008 Apr;100(4):439-43. doi: 10.1016/s0027-9684(15)31279-7. PMID: 18481485. In 1987, she was appointed chief of neurosurgery at Children’s Hospital, a position she held until her retirement in 2001.

After retiring in 2001 and moving to Florida, Canady found a need for a pediatric neurosurgeon at Pensacola's Sacred Heart Hospital, which lacked any. Therefore, Canady came out of retirement and helped develop a pediatric neurosurgery department at Pensacola's Sacred Heart Hospital until it was complete in 2012, when she officially retired.

In addition to her clinical responsibilities, Canady served as a professor of neurosurgery at Wayne State University, where she helped train the next generation of neurosurgeons and contributed to pediatric neurosurgical research and academic advancement.

This commitment to education extended outside the university as well. She actively encouraged young girls to pursue careers in STEM fields. Her own path required overcoming significant self-doubt, a challenge she highlighted when she said, “The greatest challenge I faced in becoming a neurosurgeon was believing it was possible.” Through both her teaching and her career achievements, she became a notable figure of representation in the medical community.

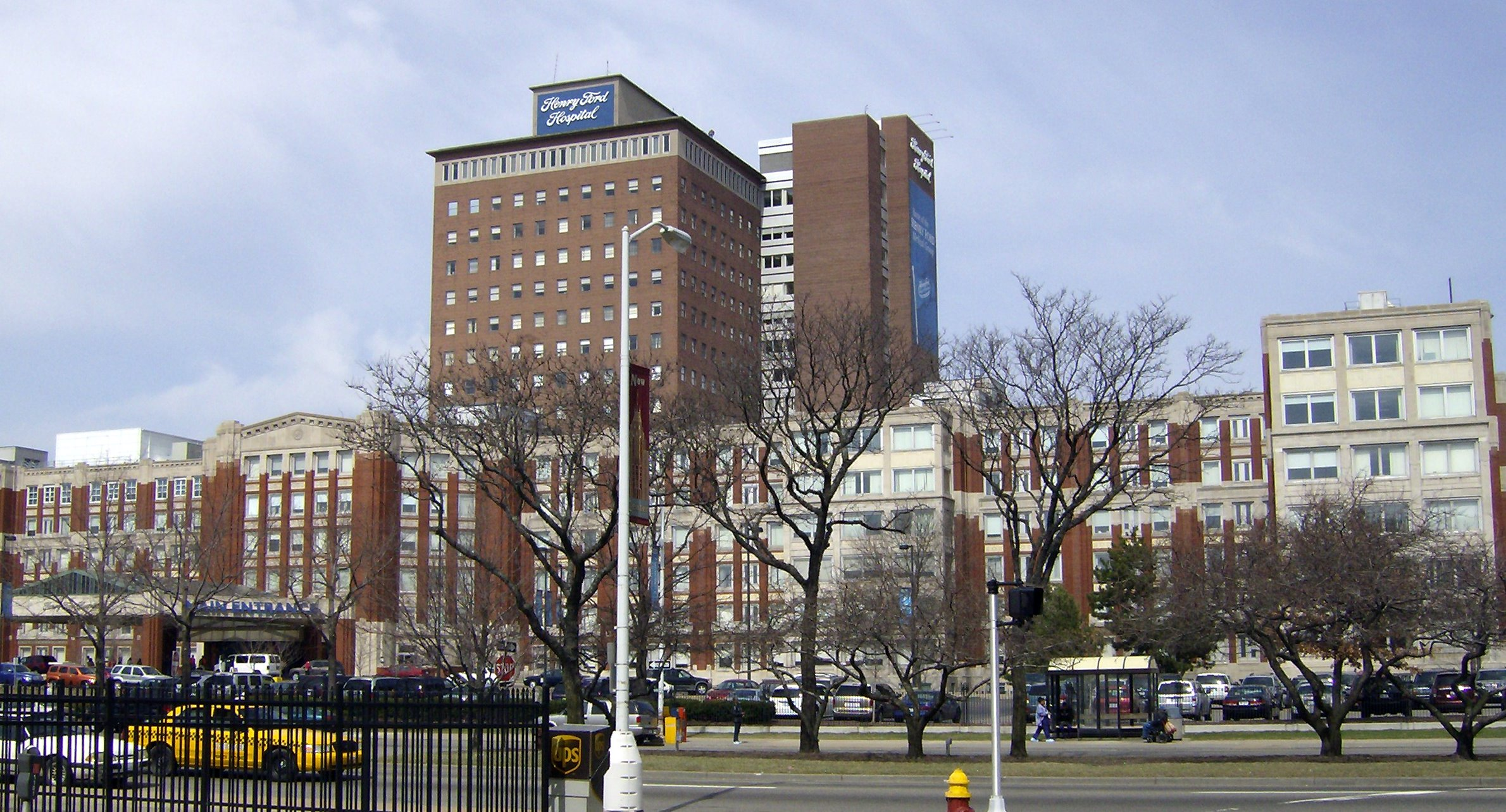
Henry Ford Hospital in Detroit, Michigan — one of the leading academic medical centers in the Midwest.

== Research and innovation ==
Canady’s research work focused on congenital spinal defects, hydrocephalus, brain tumors, and head trauma. She was a co-inventor of a programmable antisiphon shunt system designed to treat hydrocephalus, a condition in which excess cerebrospinal fluid accumulates in the brain's ventricles. The device allowed for pressure adjustments without additional surgical intervention and helped reduce complications associated with overdrainage. It incorporated antisiphon mechanisms and programmability features that enabled safer, more personalized cerebrospinal fluid management in pediatric patients.

The patent for the device was granted in 2000 and assigned to Wayne State University, where Canady served as a professor and division chief in pediatric neurosurgery.

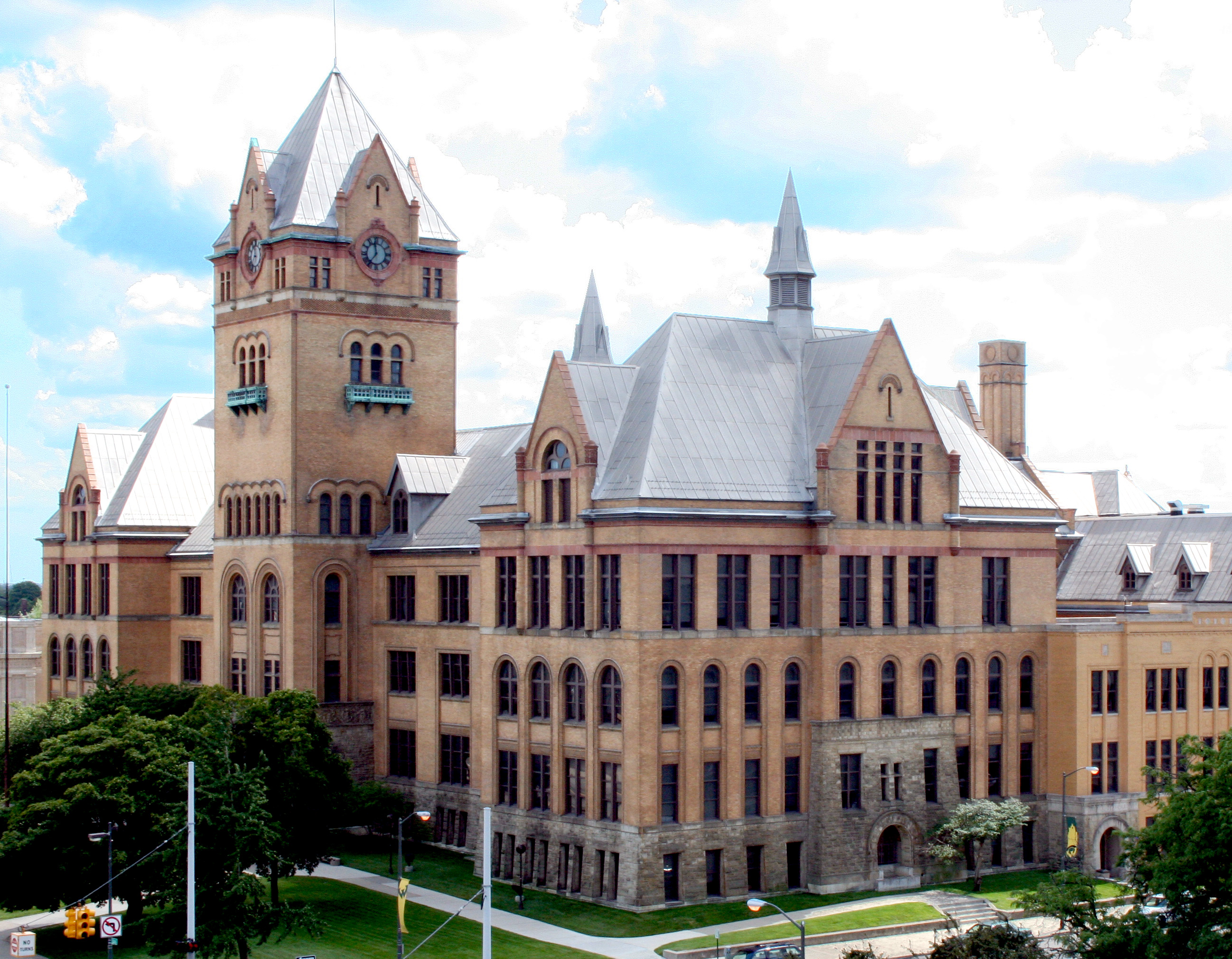
Old Main building at Wayne State University in Detroit, Michigan.

== Reflections ==
The following paraphrased statements capture key themes from Dr. Canady’s reflections and interviews, as found in her National Institute of Health biography:

Dr. Canady’s interest in medicine began after a summer experience in Dr. Art Bloom’s genetics lab and clinic, where the hands-on exposure inspired her to pursue a medical career.
— Alexa Canady

One of her biggest hurdles was pushing past doubts—both from herself and others—that she could complete neurosurgical training. She focused on proving she was capable and deserving of the opportunity.
— Alexa Canady

She emphasized the importance of being approachable and making patients feel safe, allowing for open communication and care that addressed the needs of the entire family.
— Alexa Canady

She reflected on how obsession over obstacles can sometimes be counter-productive. Instead, she tries to think about how she can do better next time and develop her skills, then move on from the encounter without dwelling on it. — Alexa Canady

She acknowledged several mentors who played critical roles in her development: Dr. Bloom nurtured her curiosity; Dr. Chou demonstrated surgical excellence; and Dr. Schut provided crucial training and opened doors for her advancement.
— Alexa Canady

This paraphrased quote is from The National Library of Medicine:

She thought of surgery as a business where you provide a service as subtly as you can. However, it is imperative that you act as a human and be human. In order to provide a good service patients must feel comfortable enough to speak freely to you and approach you. You cannot seem like a higher up or better person than them.

-Alexa Canady

== Legacy and impact ==
Dr. Canady’s career as the first African American woman neurosurgeon contributed to increased visibility and representation in the fields of neurosurgery and medical education. Her achievements addressed longstanding racial and gender disparities, encouraging more underrepresented minorities to enter medicine, particularly surgical specialties. In her work in pediatric neurosurgery, she prioritized patient-centered care and supported the training and development of medical students and residents.

If you do good work, the rest doesn’t matter.
— Alexa Canady

== Retirement and later years ==
In 2001, Canady retired from her role as Chief of Neurosurgery at Children's Hospital of Michigan in Detroit. She also withdrew from her position as Professor and Vice-chair of Neurosurgery at Wayne State University. Canady then moved to Pensacola, Florida with her husband, a Navy veteran. Although she initially planned to retire fully, a regional shortage of pediatric neurosurgeons led her to join the staff at Sacred Heart Hospital (Pensacola) part-time. She continued providing care until her full retirement in 2012.

Reflecting on her career, Canady noted that it was only after stepping back from medicine that she began to understand the broader impact of her achievements on women and African Americans who viewed her as a trailblazer. In 2025, she celebrated her 50th anniversary as an alum of the University of Michigan Medical School and attended a celebration in which she answered questions and gave advice to current medical students.

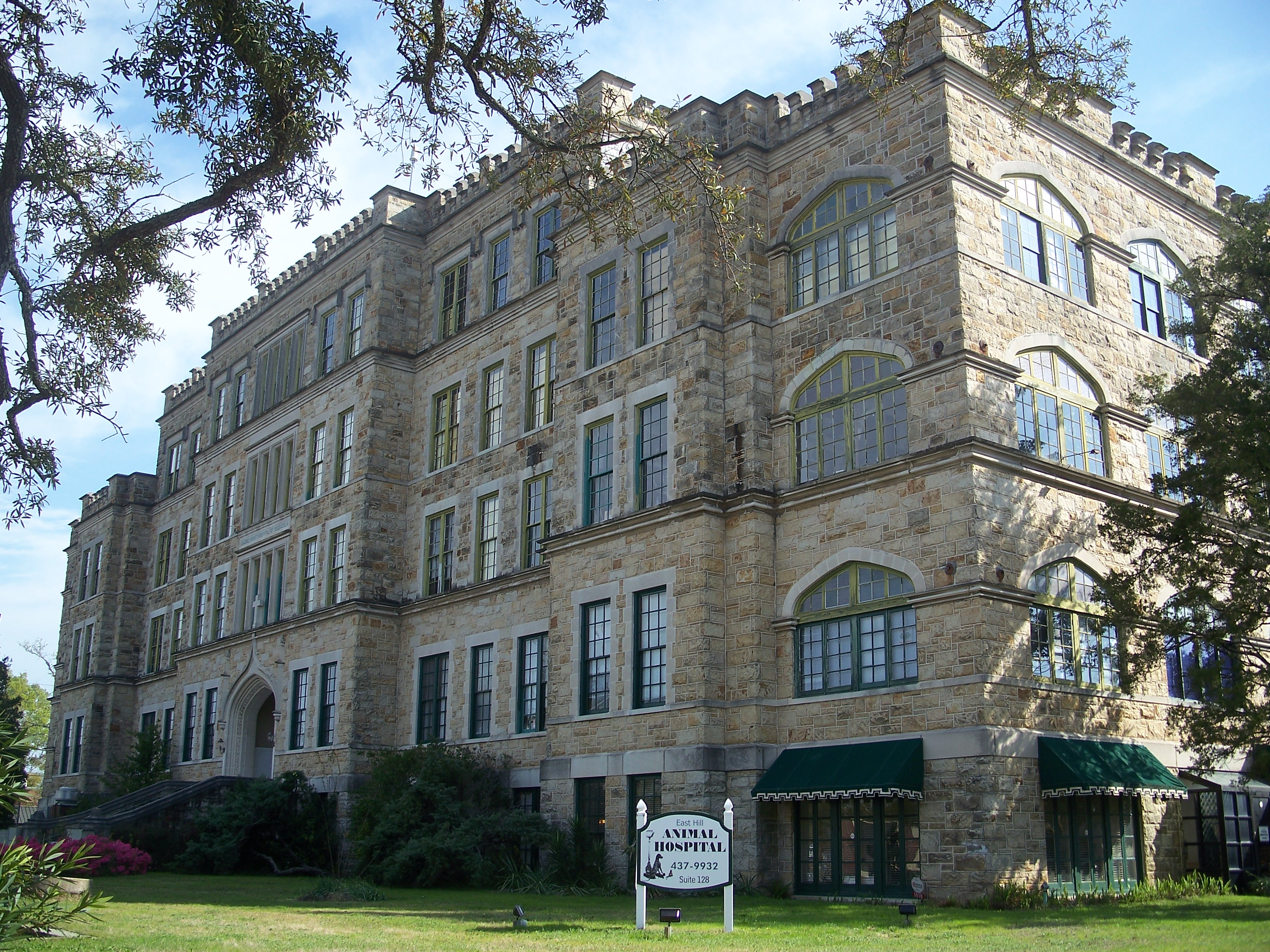
Historic Sacred Heart Hospital building in Pensacola, Florida, completed in 1915 and listed on the National Register of Historic Places.

== In popular culture ==
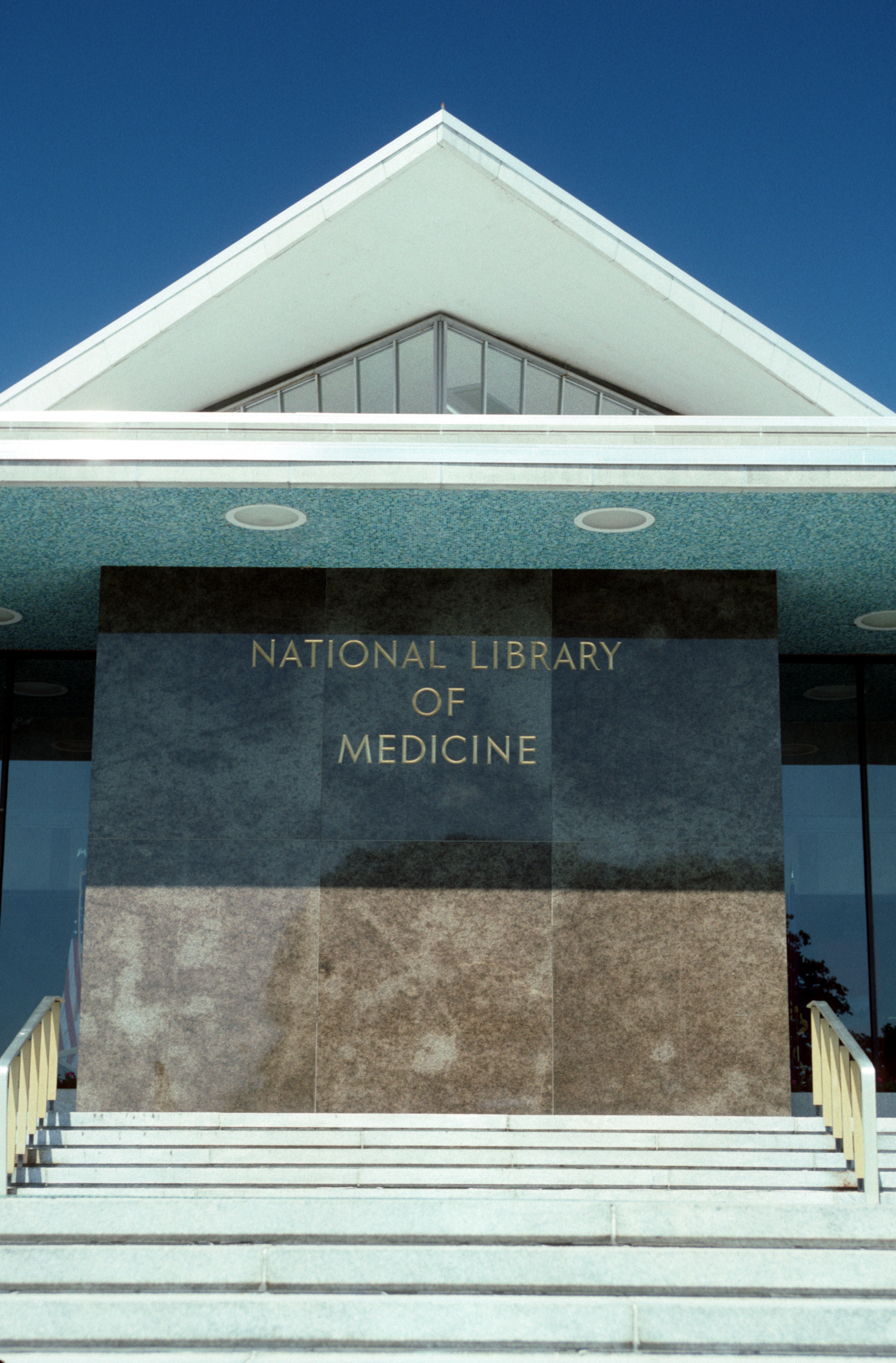
The National Library of Medicine, NIH campus, Bethesda, Maryland

Alexa I. Canady is prominently featured in the National Library of Medicine’s Opening Doors: Contemporary African American Academic Surgeons exhibit.

== Awards and honors ==
Award	Organization	Year	Notes	Ref
Teacher of the Year	Children's Hospital of Michigan	1984	Recognized by colleagues for medical education	
Candace Award for Science	National Coalition of 100 Black Women	1986	For trailblazing achievements in neurosurgery	
Michigan Women's Hall of Fame	Michigan Women's Historical Center and Hall of Fame	1989	First African American woman neurosurgeon	
President’s Award	American Medical Women's Association	1993	Recognition of her medical excellence	
Distinguished Service Award	Wayne State University School of Medicine	1994	Outstanding contributions to neurosurgery	
Honorary Doctor of Humane Letters	University of Detroit Mercy	1997	For public service and medical leadership	
Honorary Doctor of Science	Southern Connecticut State University	1999	For contributions to academic medicine	
Honorary Doctor of Humane Letters	Roosevelt University	2014	Legacy recognition in higher education	
Black History Month Honoree	Nickelodeon	2015	Animated short celebrating her legacy	

== Leadership, memberships, and professional recognition ==
Role / Membership	Organization	Notes	Year(s)	Citation
Chief of Neurosurgery	Children's Hospital of Michigan	Led top-tier pediatric neurosurgery department at a major academic hospital	1987–2001	
Professor of Neurosurgery	Wayne State University School of Medicine	Taught surgical residents and medical students while serving in clinical leadership	1987–2001	
Member	Congress of Neurological Surgeons	National professional organization for neurosurgeons	n.d.	
Member	Society of Pediatric Neurosurgery	Focused on pediatric neurological care and surgery	n.d.	
Member	American Association of Neurological Surgeons	Major U.S. neurosurgical professional society	n.d.	

== Selected publications ==
Year	Title	Journal	Co-authors	Notes
2000	Kaolin-induced hydrocephalus in the hamster: Temporal sequence of changes in intracranial pressure, ventriculomegaly, and whole-brain specific gravity	Experimental Neurology	Ding Y, Yao B, Canady AI, Wilber GP	Animal model of hydrocephalus and intracranial dynamics. ResearchGate
2001	Axonal damage associated with enlargement of ventricles during hydrocephalus: A silver impregnation study	Neurological Research	Ding Y, McAllister JP, Yao B, Canady AI	Study of neural degeneration during hydrocephalus. ResearchGate
2001	Impaired Motor Learning in Children with Hydrocephalus	Pediatric Neurosurgery	Ding Y, Lai Q, McAllister JP, Canady AI	Analysis of motor learning deficits in hydrocephalic children. ResearchGate
2001	Current Treatment of Hydrocephalus	Neurosurgery Quarterly	Sood S, Ham SD, Canady AI	Review of treatment options and outcomes for hydrocephalus. ResearchGate
2001	Postural Changes in Intracranial Pressure in Chronically Shunted Patients	Pediatric Neurosurgery	Barami K, Sood S, Ham SD, Canady AI	Study on intracranial pressure regulation in shunted patients. ResearchGate
2001	Evaluation of Shunt Malfunction Using Shunt Site Reservoir	Pediatric Neurosurgery	Barami K, Canady AI, Ham SD, Sood S	Assessment of shunt function with reservoir techniques. ResearchGate
2004	Pathophysiological changes in cerebrovascular distensibility in patients undergoing chronic shunt therapy	Journal of Neurosurgery	Sood S, Kumar CR, Jamous MA, Canady AI	Study on cerebrovascular compliance in shunt therapy. ResearchGate

== Timeline ==
Legend

Birth and early life
Education
Medical training and early career
Academic and professional leadership
Awards and honors

Click to expand timeline

1950 – Born in Lansing, Michigan, United States.

↓

1971 – Earned B.S. in zoology from the University of Michigan.

↓

1975 – Earned M.D. cum laude from the University of Michigan Medical School; inducted into Alpha Omega Alpha.

↓

1975–1976 – Surgical internship at Yale-New Haven Hospital.

↓

1977–1981 – Completed neurosurgery residency at University of Minnesota, becoming the first African American woman neurosurgeon in the U.S.

↓

1981 – Joined Henry Ford Hospital and later became pediatric neurosurgeon at Children's Hospital of Michigan.

↓

1984 – Became the first African American woman board-certified in neurosurgery.

↓

1987 – Appointed chief of neurosurgery at Children's Hospital of Michigan and professor at Wayne State University.

↓

1989 – Inducted into the Michigan Women's Hall of Fame.

↓

1993 – Received the President’s Award from the American Medical Women's Association.

↓

2000 – Granted U.S. Patent 6,090,062 for a programmable antisiphon shunt system.

↓

2001 – Retired from surgical leadership role in Detroit.

↓

2001–2012 – Practiced part-time pediatric neurosurgery at Sacred Heart Hospital in Pensacola, Florida.

↓

2014 – Awarded honorary Doctor of Humane Letters by Roosevelt University.

== See also ==
- Pediatric neurosurgery
- African-American women in medicine
- Delta Sigma Theta
- Opening Doors: Contemporary African American Academic Surgeons
  - LaSalle D. Leffall Jr.
  - Charles R. Drew
  - Rosalyn P. Scott
  - Official exhibit – U.S. National Library of Medicine
