= Individually purchased health insurance =

In the United States, individually purchased health insurance is health insurance purchased directly by individuals, and not those provided through employers. Self-employed individuals receive a tax deduction for their health insurance and can buy health insurance with additional tax benefits. According to the US Census Bureau, about 9% of Americans are covered under individual health insurance. In the individual market, consumers pay the entire premium without an employer contribution, and most do not receive any tax benefit. The range of products available is similar to those provided through employers. However, average out-of-pocket spending is higher in the individual market, with higher deductibles, co-payments and other cost-sharing provisions. Major medical is the most commonly purchased form of individual health insurance.

== Economics ==
Premiums can vary significantly by age. In states that allow medical underwriting, an individual's health information may be used in determining whether to cover the individual and the premium to be paid. However, under the Patient Protection and Affordable Care Act, effective since 2014, insurers are prohibited from discriminating against or charging higher rates for any individuals based on pre-existing medical conditions. For individuals who pass individual medical underwriting where it is used, the average premiums they pay are lower than the average paid for employer-sponsored coverage (this comparison is based on the entire premium for employer-sponsored coverage, including both the employee and employer contributions). Factors that may contribute to this include: differences in age; less generous coverage in the individual market (higher beneficiary cost sharing); and a tendency for individual consumers to only buy benefits that they expect to need and use while group coverage may provide some benefits that most beneficiaries do not use. Individual policyholders are also more likely to report being in excellent health than are people covered by employer-sponsored health insurance, which may be a contributing factor. Premiums in the individual market rose less rapidly over the period 2002-2005 than did out-of-pocket premiums in the employer-sponsored market (17.8% versus 34.4%). The increase was larger for family policies than for single policies (25.3% for family policies; the increase for single policies was not statistically significant). These comparisons did not adjust for changes in benefit levels.

Research confirms that the individual health insurance market is sensitive to price. Estimates of demand elasticity in this market vary, but generally fall in the range of -0.3 to -0.1. It appears that price sensitivity varies among population subgroups and is generally higher for younger individuals and lower income individuals. One study found that among individuals who lack other sources of health coverage, the percentage purchasing individual insurance increases steadily with income. However, even among those with incomes four times the federal poverty level, only about a fourth buy individual coverage. The self-employed, who can tax-deduct their premiums, are more likely to purchase than other individuals. The researchers concluded that affordability appears to be a key barrier to coverage in this market, and that any premium subsidies would likely have to be substantial to be effective. The researchers note that other factors such as health status and the complexity of the market can also affect the purchase of individual health insurance, but conclude that they are unlikely to be the primary drivers of low coverage rates.

Many states allow medical underwriting of applicants for individually purchased health insurance. An estimated 5 million of those without health insurance are considered "uninsurable" because of pre-existing conditions. A number of proposals have been advanced to limit the effect of underwriting on consumers and improve access to coverage. Each has its own advantages and limitations. One 2008 study found that people of average health are least likely to become uninsured if they have large group health coverage, more likely to become uninsured if they have small group coverage, and most likely to become uninsured if they have individual health insurance. But, "for people in poor or fair health, the chances of losing coverage are much greater for people who had small-group insurance than for those who had individual insurance." The authors attribute these results to the combination in the individual market of high costs and guaranteed renewability of coverage. Individual coverage costs more if it is purchased after a person becomes unhealthy, but "provides better protection (compared to group insurance) against high premiums for already individually insured people who become high risk." Healthy individuals are more likely to drop individual coverage than less-expensive, subsidized employment-based coverage, but group coverage leaves them "more vulnerable to dropping or losing any and all coverage than does individual insurance" if they become seriously ill.

In August 2008 the Hartford Courant reported that competition was increasing in the individual health insurance market, with more insurers entering the market, an increased variety of products, and a broader spread of prices.

== Regulation ==
Individual health insurance is primarily regulated at the state level, consistent with the McCarran-Ferguson Act. Model acts and regulations promulgated by the National Association of Insurance Commissioners (NAIC) provide some degree of uniformity state to state. These models do not have the force of law and have no effect unless they are adopted by a state. They are, however, used as guides by most states, and some states adopt them with little or no change. The primary NAIC models affecting the individual health insurance market are:

- The Uniform Individual Accident and Sickness Policy Provision Law (UPPL);
- The Accident and Sickness Insurance Minimum Standards Model Act;
- The Advertisements of Accident and Sickness Insurance Model Regulation; and
- The Unfair Trade Practices Act.

All of these models have been implemented in one form or another by most states.

Federal laws affecting individual health insurance include:

- The Health Insurance Portability and Accountability Act (HIPAA);
- The Newborns' and Mothers' Health Protection Act;
- The Women's Health and Cancer Rights Act;
- The Fair Credit Reporting Act; and
- Federal rules governing Medicare supplement policies.

== See also ==
- Health insurance in the United States
- Health insurance coverage in the United States
- Health insurance marketplace
