= Lillie Shockney =

American breast cancer professor (born 1956)

- Born: Lillian Dierker; October 16, 1953 (age 72); Maryland, US
- Education: Johns Hopkins University; Saint Joseph's College of Maine
- Occupations: University Distinguished Service Professor of Breast Cancer; Professor of Surgery
- Employer: Johns Hopkins School of Medicine
- Awards: 2023, Advanced Breast Cancer (ABC) international life time achievement award

Lillie D. Shockney, RN, BS, MAS, is the University Distinguished Service Professor of Breast Cancer and Professor of Surgery and Oncology at Johns Hopkins University School of Medicine. A two-time survivor of breast cancer, Shockney works both as a nurse navigator supporting patients and as a medical advisor and administrator developing programs for improving patient quality of life, in particular for those with metastatic breast cancer. Shockney has published at least 20 books and 350 articles dealing with cancer and patient care. She has been the Editor-in-Chief of the Journal of Oncology Navigation & Survivorship (2012–2023).

Shockney has served on or advised numerous national-level organizations. In 1997, she testified before the U.S. Senate committee regarding the Women's Health and Cancer Rights Act. She is a co-founder of the nonprofit Mothers Supporting Daughters with Breast Cancer (1995); the Academy of Oncology Nurse & Patient Navigators (AONN+, 2009); and the Association of Chronic & Complex Care Nurse Navigators (ACCCNN, 2021). She has helped to develop the Work Stride: Managing Cancer at Work employee benefits program at Johns Hopkins, which has been adopted by other employers. She has been recognized for her work with awards at state, national and international levels. The Academy of Oncology Nurse & Patient Navigators has named its Lillie D. Shockney Lifetime Achievement Award in her honor.

== Early life and education ==
Lillian Dierker was born October 16, 1953, to Frank and Charmayne Dierker and grew up on a dairy farm in Maryland. Having aspired to be a nurse from an early age, she received a three-year diploma from the Macqueen Gibbs Willis School of Nursing in Easton, Maryland in 1974. She earned a bachelor's degree in Health Care Administration from St. Joseph's College in 1982. She earned a Master's in Administrative Science (M.A.S.) from Johns Hopkins University in 1988.

== Career ==
External media

Audio
- "How to Help Breast Cancer Survivors Become Breast Cancer Thrivers: Lillie Shockney", Oncology Data Advisor, November 10, 2021

Video
- Breakthrough Women in Science & Medicine: Lillie Shockney, PBS, 2023
- The Power of Metastatic Breast Cancer Retreats With Lillie Shockney and Janie Metsker, Keira Smith, Oncology Data Advisor, 2022

=== Johns Hopkins ===
In 1983, Shockney joined the Department of Neurosurgery at Johns Hopkins as a nurse, working with patients who had glioblastoma, an almost-always fatal form of brain cancer. From 1987 to 1997 Shockney served as the Director of Performance Improvement and Utilization Management. In that role, she and her staff reviewed patient files to evaluate the quality of care they received, and determine ways to better serve them.

Shockney was diagnosed with breast cancer and underwent mastectomies in 1992 and again in 1994. Approximately ten years after her diagnosis, Shockney had DIEP flap reconstruction surgery.

The experience of being a breast cancer patient led Shockney to work with breast cancer patients and to develop programs to improve their care and quality of life. Soon after her first mastectomy, a doctor she knew asked her if she was willing to talk to his secretary, who had just been diagnosed. Shockney later said of that experience "I felt pain free for two hours, because I was helping somebody." Shockney chose to combine her expertise and her personal experience as a breast cancer survivor in support of others.

In 1997, Shockney became the administrative director of the Johns Hopkins Breast Center. She managed programs for quality-of-care, patient education, and patient advocacy, as well as the center's survivor volunteers, community outreach, and web site, introducing many of the initiatives at the center.

Shockney organized the nurse navigator program at Johns Hopkins, in which a nurse with expertise in both cancer treatment and counseling provides ongoing patient-centered support throughout a patient's experience within the medical system. Nurse navigators play important roles in educating patients and families, and in providing continuity and support across the continuum of patient care. Recognizing the impact of non-medical factors on the success or failure of medical treatment, nurse navigators help patients to deal with practical issues of daily life like arranging child care or transportation as well as the complexities of the medical system. The approach was originally developed by Harold P. Freeman, working with cancer patients in Harlem. After Shockney reported the impact of the program at Johns Hopkins Hospital on appointment completion rates and timeliness of care, breast cancer patients became a primary patient population for nurse navigation. Shockney emphasizes the importance of identifying each individual's goals and focusing on what they hope to achieve.

Shockney has also developed small group retreats for metastatic breast cancer patients and their spouses or caregivers, to help them focus on quality of life throughout their lives, and to communicate about topics that may be hard to address, such as sex and death. One of the practices suggested is writing cards and letters, to be given in the future for meaningful events such as birthdays, graduation, marriage, or the birth of a child. In a situation where people feel vulnerable and overwhelmed, Shockney emphasizes the importance of enabling them to regain a sense of control in their lives.

I'm passionate about taking care of patients with metastatic breast cancer.... I want their quality of life preserved and not forfeited. I want them not to postpone joy. I want them to find something to laugh about every day. I want them to know they are not alone on this journey filled with uncertainty. – Lillie Shockney, 2019

Shockney's emphasis on identifying the things that each individual loves has inspired patients like Pat Artimovich. Artimovich rediscovered her love of horseback riding, and eventually organized the Potomac Valley Dressage Association's Ride for Life. Over 20 years, the Ride raised over $1 million, which has been used to support breast cancer research fellowships at Johns Hopkins as well as education and patient support.

In 2008, Shockney was appointed as the University Distinguished Service Assistant Professor of Breast Cancer at Johns Hopkins. For the first time, a hospital nurse received the level of recognition of being designated for extraordinary distinguished service. In 2016, she was appointed the University Distinguished Service Professor of Breast Cancer, and made a professor of Surgery and Oncology. Again she was the first nurse in the country to be appointed at such a level.

In 2011, Shockney became Director of the Johns Hopkins Cancer Survivorship Programs in addition to being administrative director of the Breast Center. She remained in both positions until November 2018, when she retired from the directorships. She continues to serve on the faculty of the Johns Hopkins University School of Medicine.

=== Beyond Johns Hopkins ===
The impact of Shockney's advocacy, publications and programs has been felt far beyond Johns Hopkins. Schockney's programs for nurse navigation and patient retreats have been adopted by other institutions.

In 1995, Shockney and her mother, Charmayne Dierker, co-founded the national nonprofit Mothers Supporting Daughters with Breast Cancer. In 1997, Shockney testified before the U.S. Senate committee regarding the Women's Health and Cancer Rights Act. She argued that insurers should cover the costs of reconstructive breast surgery, just as they covered reconstructive surgery for testicular cancer. When the act was passed, coverage for women as well as men became part of the law.

In 2003, she became chair of the National Quality Initiative of the National Consortium of Breast Centers (NCBC). As of 2012, the NCBC's National Quality Measures for Breast Centers (NQMBC) program was credited with providing the most detailed surgical quality measures available, listing 37 measures for breast cancer diagnosis and treatment.

In 2009, Shockney co-founded the Academy of Oncology Nurse & Patient Navigators (AONN+). She served as its program director from 2009 to 2019. When AONN+ became a member of the American College of Surgeons Commission on Cancer (CoC) in 2015, Shockney represented the organization as its commissioner to the CoC. In 2020, the AONN+ Foundation for Learning, Inc. received national accreditation from the ANSI National Accreditation Board (ANAB) and its parent, the American National Standards Institute (ANSI). The Foundation became the only national program with certification under ISO/IEC 17024 for programs in oncology nurse and patient navigation.

With Terry Langbaum, Shockney helped to develop the Work Stride: Managing Cancer at Work employee benefits program at Johns Hopkins. Launched there in 2012, it was offered to other employers as of 2016 through a collaboration with Johns Hopkins HealthCare Solutions.

Shockney served as the Editor-in-Chief of the Journal of Oncology Navigation & Survivorship from 2012 to 2023. She has also served on the editorial boards of journals such as the Annals of Nursing and Practice.

In 2021, Shockney co-founded the Association of Chronic & Complex Care Nurse Navigators (ACCCNN) with Billie Lynn Allard and Jennifer Edwards. The professional association held its inaugural summit in 2023, for nurse navigators caring for patients with chronic diseases.

== Awards and honors ==
Shockney has received both national and state level awards for her work, including the following:

- 2002, Excellence in Breast Cancer Education Award, Oncology Nursing Society
- 2003, Impact Award, National Corsortium of Breast Centers
- 2005, Professor of Survivorship award, Susan G. Komen Foundation, the first non-physician to receive this award.
- 2006, Patient of Courage, American Society of Plastic Surgeons (ASPS)
- 2009, Excellence in Survivor Advocacy Award, Oncology Nursing Society
- 2010, Maryland Women's Hall of Fame
- 2012, "Amazing Nurse", Johnson & Johnson Campaign for Nursing's Future
- 2014, Catherine Logan Award for Service to Survivorship, National Coalition for Cancer Survivorship
- 2018, AONN+ Lifetime Achievement Award, Academy of Oncology Nurse & Patient Navigators (AONN+), inaugural recipient, subsequently renamed the Lillie D. Shockney Lifetime Achievement Award
- 2019, WebMD Health Hero Awards
- 2020, ELITE 2020 Master Educator, PM360.
- 2023, ABC Award, ABC Global Alliance, Lisbon, Portugal (ABC=Advanced Breast Cancer; international lifetime achievement award)

== Selected publications ==
- Shockney, Lillie (2007). Stealing Second Base: A Breast Cancer Survivor's Story and Breast Cancer Expert's Story. Sadbur, MA: Jones and Bartlett Publishers.
- Shockney, Lillie; Tsangaris, Theodore N. (2008). The Johns Hopkins breast cancer handbook for health care professionals. Sudbury, Mass: Jones and Bartlett Publishers. ISBN 978-0763749927.
- Shockney, Lillie (2014). Fulfilling hope: supporting the needs of patients with advanced cancers. New York: Nova Publishers. ISBN 978-1633210783.
- Shockney, Lillie D., ed. (2018). Team-Based Oncology Care: The Pivotal Role of Oncology Navigation. Springer. ISBN 978-3319690377.
- Shockney, Lillie (2021). Oncology nurse navigation: transitioning into the field (First ed.). Burlington, MA: Jones & Bartlett Learning. ISBN 978-1284198607.
