= Hortense Canady =

American civil right leader

- Born: Elizabeth Hortense Golden; August 18, 1927; Chicago, Illinois, US
- Died: October 23, 2010 (aged 83)
- Organization: Delta Sigma Theta sorority
- Spouse(s): Clinton Canady, Jr.

Hortense (Golden) Canady (August 18, 1927 – October 23, 2010) was a civil rights leader, the first African American elected to the Lansing Board of Education. She served as national president of Delta Sigma Theta sorority from 1983-1988.

== Biography ==
Canady was born Elizabeth Hortense Golden on August 18, 1927 in Chicago, Illinois. At age 16, she enrolled in Fisk University, where she met her husband. The two were married on her 18th birthday, prior to his deployment during World War II. She continued her education at Fisk and later received a Bachelor of Science degree in Zoology. Later in life, she went back to school and received a master's degree in higher education from Michigan State University.

Her daughter Alexa Canady was the first African-American woman to become a neurosurgeon.
