= LaSalle D. Leffall Jr. =

American surgical oncologist and medical educator

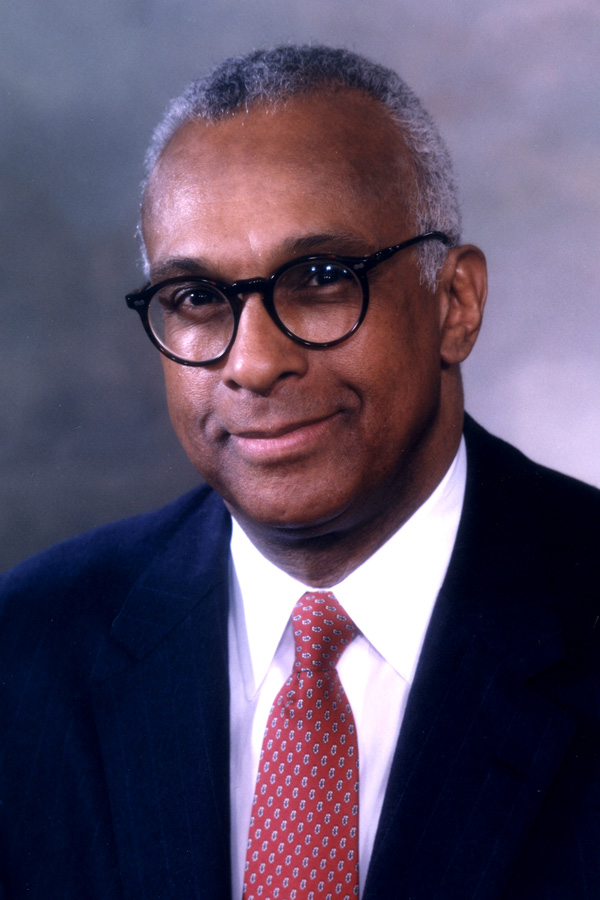
- LaSalle D. Leffall Jr. as featured in the NLM Opening Doors exhibit
- Born: LaSalle Doheny Leffall Jr. 22 May 1930; Tallahassee, Florida, U.S.
- Died: 25 May 2019 (aged 89); Washington, D.C., U.S.
- Education: Florida A&M University (BS); Howard University College of Medicine (MD)
- Occupations: Surgeon; Medical educator; Oncologist
- Known for: First African American president of the American Cancer Society and American College of Surgeons
- Notable work: No Boundaries: A Cancer Surgeon’s Odyssey; Equanimity Under Duress
- Spouse: Ruth McWilliams Leffall (m. 1956)
- Children: LaSalle D. Leffall III
- Awards: Distinguished Service Award, American Cancer Society; Full list

Signature
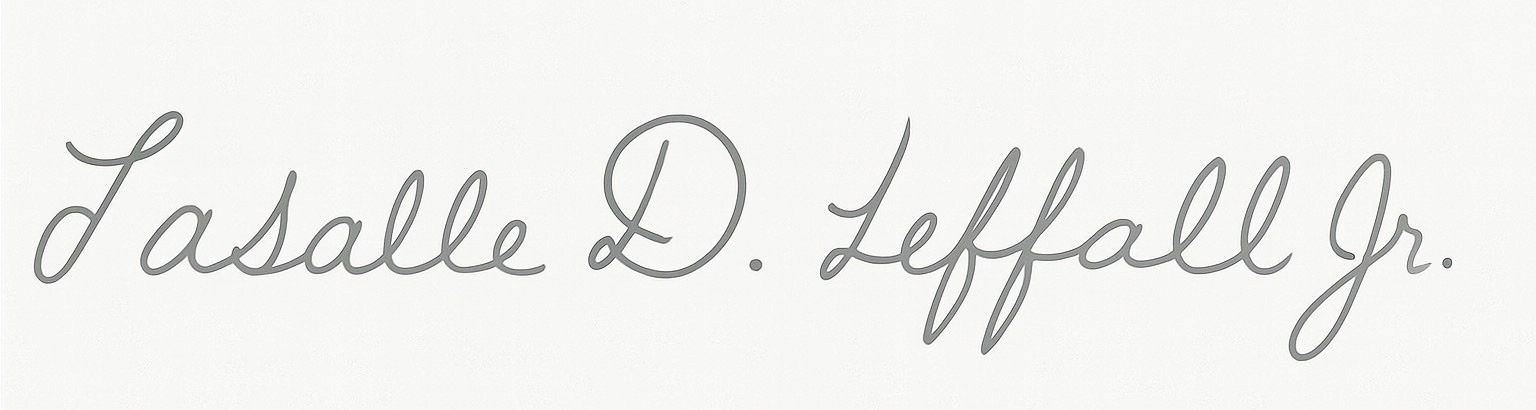

Military service
- Military career
- Allegiance: United States
- Branch: United States Army Medical Corps
- Service years: 1960–1961 (two years)
- Rank: Major
- Units: U.S. Army Hospital – Munich, Germany

LaSalle D. Leffall Jr. (May 22, 1930 – May 25, 2019) was an American surgeon, surgical oncologist, and medical educator. He chaired the Department of Surgery at Howard University College of Medicine from 1970 to 1995 and served as the Charles R. Drew Professor of Surgery. In 1978, Leffall became the first African American president of the American Cancer Society, and in 1995, he became the first African American president of the American College of Surgeons.

== Early life and education ==
LaSalle Doheny Leffall Jr. was born on May 22, 1930, in Tallahassee, Florida, and raised in nearby Quincy, Florida, during the era of segregation. His parents, LaSalle D. Leffall Sr. and Lula Jourdan Leffall, were both educators and emphasized the value of academic excellence and perseverance despite racial barriers. His father was a professor of agriculture at Florida Agricultural and Mechanical College (FAMU), and his mother was also a teacher.

Leffall graduated from Dr. Wallace S. Stevens High School in 1945 at age 15, and earned a B.S. degree in biology, summa cum laude, from Florida A&M University in 1948. He received his M.D. from the Howard University College of Medicine in 1952. Initially rejected from admission, Leffall was accepted after FAMU President William H. Gray personally intervened on his behalf. He graduated first in his class. His mentors included Charles R. Drew, Burke Syphax, W. Montague Cobb, and Jack E. White.

He completed his internship at Homer G. Phillips Hospital in St. Louis, followed by surgical training as an assistant resident in surgery at Freedmen's Hospital (1953–1954), assistant resident at D.C. General Hospital (1954–1955), and chief resident at Freedmen’s (1956–1957). Leffall then became one of the first Black fellows in surgical oncology at Memorial Sloan Kettering Cancer Center, where he trained from 1957 to 1959 under the mentorship of Dr. Jack E. White.

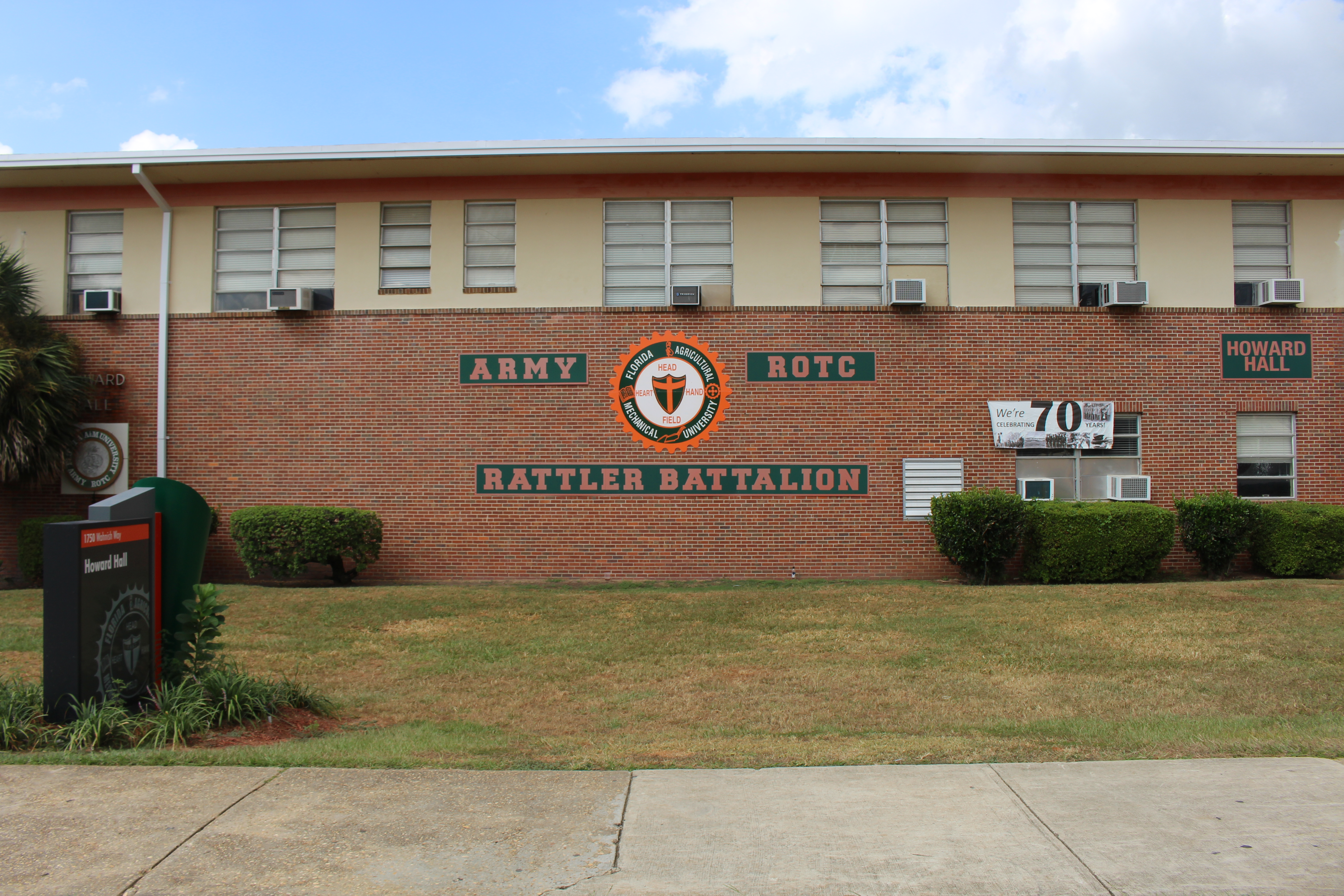
Howard Hall, part of FAMU’s College of Arts & Sciences, on the campus where Leffall earned his degrees

While attending Howard, he met Ruth McWilliams, who was struck by his polite demeanor, intelligence, kindness toward others, and strong dedication to his studies. They married in 1956 and later had a son, LaSalle “Donney” Leffall III.

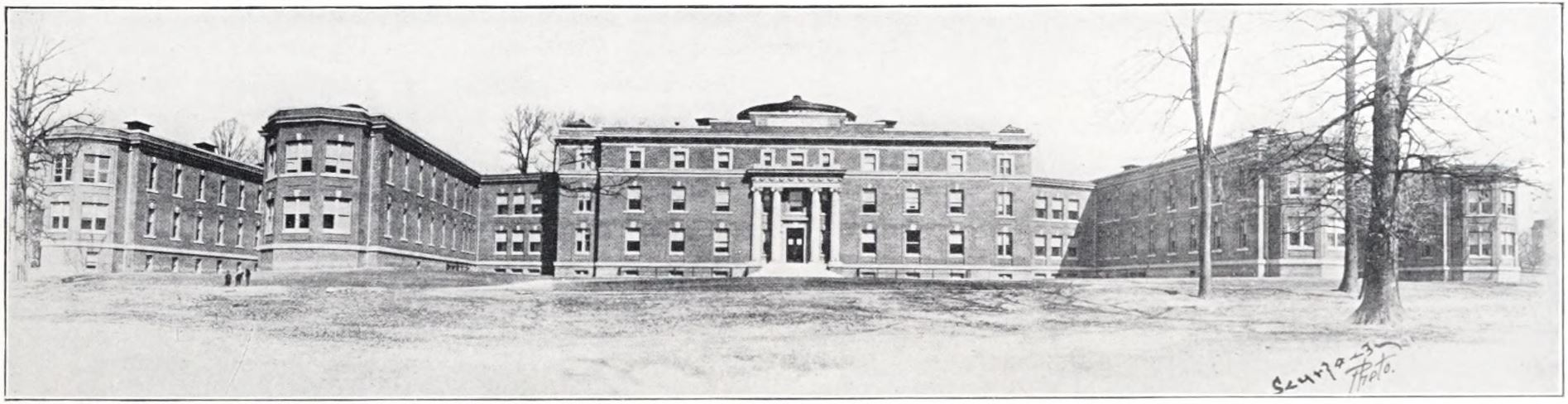
Historic facade of Freedmen’s Hospital (later Howard University Hospital), where Leffall completed his surgical residency in 1957

== Military service ==
In 1960, Leffall entered the United States Army Medical Corps with the rank of Captain, M.C.. He was stationed at Ft. Sam Houston in Texas before being assigned as chief of general surgery at the U.S. Army Hospital in Munich, Germany. He completed two years of active duty and was later honorably discharged with the rank of Major.

During his Army service, Leffall encountered racial segregation despite holding an officer’s commission. He recalled that, while stationed at Ft. Sam Houston in Texas, he and three White colleagues went to a local movie theater. Although his White colleagues were allowed to enter, Leffall was denied admission solely because of his race. In a show of solidarity, his colleagues chose to leave with him. Leffall later described the incident as one of the most painful experiences of his life, underscoring the irony of facing racial discrimination at home while preparing to serve his country abroad.

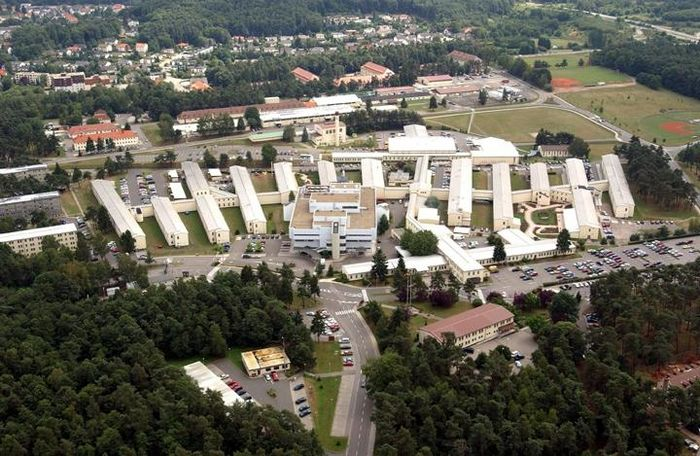
Aerial view of Landstuhl Regional Medical Center in Germany — a U.S. Army medical facility in Europe comparable in structure and operational scope to the hospital complex in Munich where Major Leffall served.

=== Military insignia ===
Below are the official insignia representing his military rank and medical branch of service:

Insignia	Description
Major rank insignia	Major (O-4), United States Army
Army Medical Corps	Branch Insignia of the U.S. Army Medical Corps

== Career, leadership, and honors ==
After completing his surgical oncology fellowship and fulfilling his Army commitment, Leffall joined the faculty of the Howard University College of Medicine in 1962. In 1970, he became one of the youngest chairs—and the first African American—to lead the Department of Surgery at Howard. In 1992, he was appointed the first Charles R. Drew Professor of Surgery, named in honor of the pioneering surgeon and medical innovator.

Throughout his more than five decades at Howard, Leffall was a dedicated educator and mentor, teaching approximately 6,000 medical students and training nearly 300 general surgery residents.

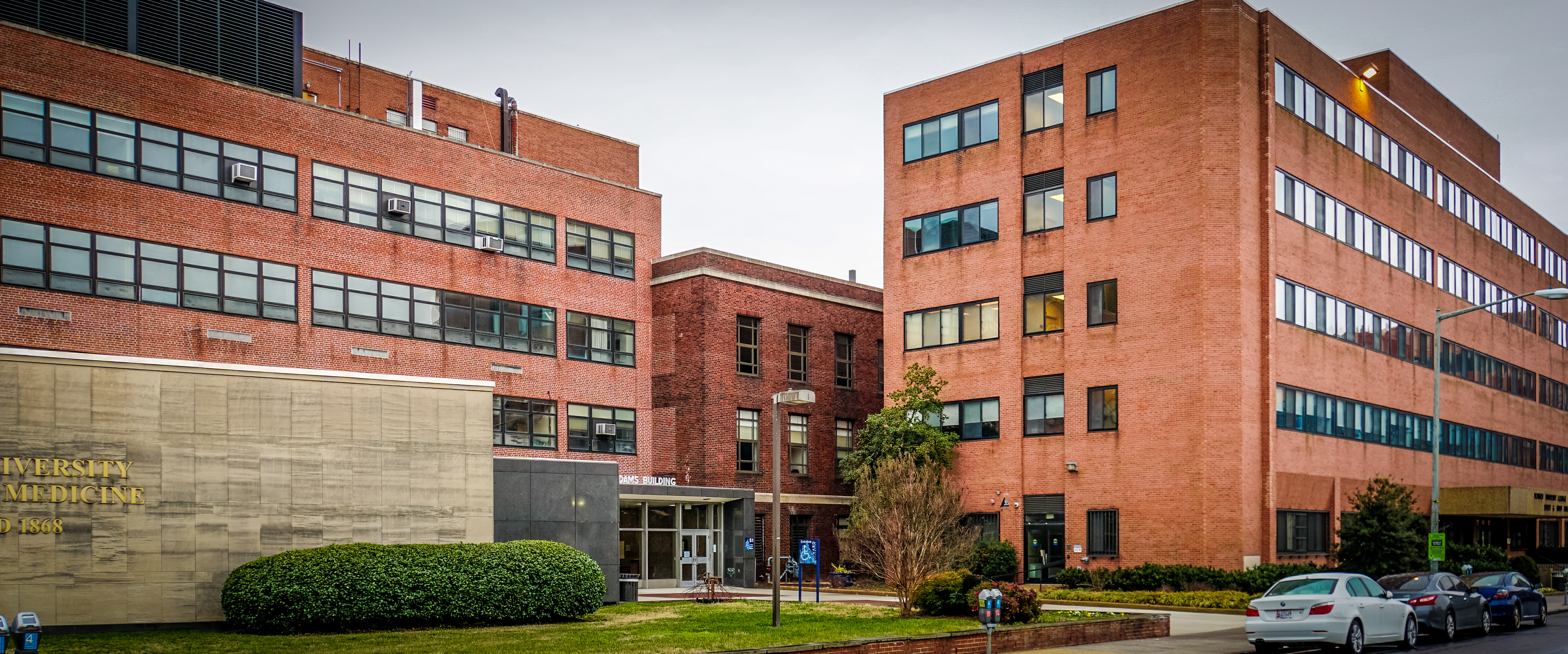
Seeley G. Mudd Building, Howard University College of Medicine—home of Leffall's faculty career

Leffall also made landmark contributions to national medical leadership. In 1978, he became the first African American elected president of the American Cancer Society. During his tenure, he launched the organization’s first national cancer disparities initiative, which addressed the rising cancer burden among African Americans and became a national model for equity in cancer care.

He went on to become the first Black president of the American College of Surgeons in 1995, and also led the Society of Surgical Oncology and the Society of Surgical Chairmen—breaking racial barriers and paving the way for underrepresented groups in surgical leadership.

In public health advocacy, Leffall served as board chair of the Susan G. Komen Breast Cancer Foundation from 2002 to 2007 and again from 2011 to 2012, where he championed efforts to improve outreach, screening, and treatment access in minority communities.

Appointed by President George W. Bush and reappointed by President Barack Obama, Leffall chaired the President’s Cancer Panel from 2002 to 2011, advising the White House on cancer policy, disparities, and national prevention strategies.

In this role, he testified before Congress and federal agencies to advocate for stronger national cancer control policies. Key appearances included:

- Addressing the House Subcommittee on Health in 2004 to present the President’s Cancer Panel Annual Report on barriers in the National Cancer Program.
- Participating in the 2007 congressional forum, Reducing Health Disparities: Bridging the Gap, where he highlighted inequities in cancer outcomes and called for targeted interventions.
- Providing expert testimony to the United States Senate Appropriations Subcommittee on Labor, Health and Human Services, Education, and Related Agencies on federal cancer control programs and minority health outcomes in 2003.

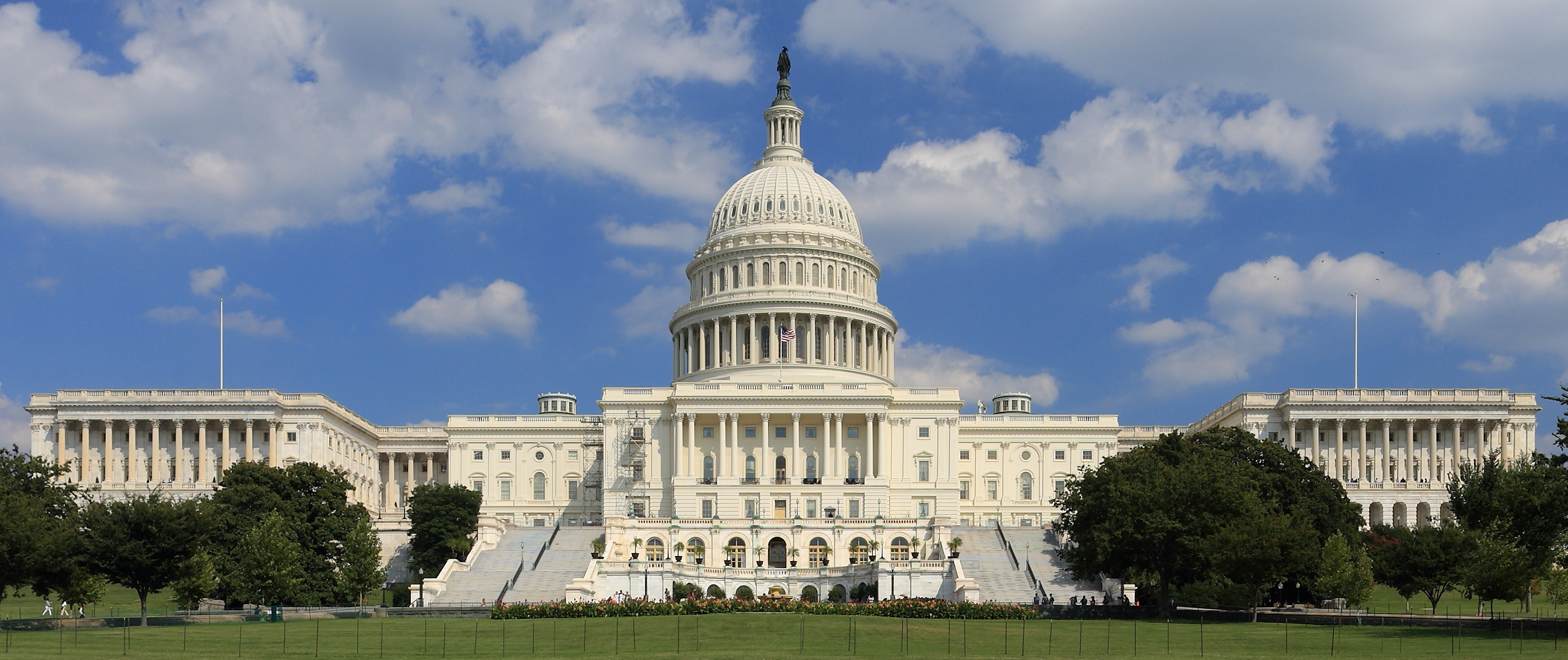
The United States Capitol

Leffall’s reputation extended globally through his affiliations with international medical bodies, including the Royal College of Surgeons of England, the German Surgical Society, the International Society of Surgery, the West African College of Surgeons, and the College of Surgeons of South Africa.

Throughout his career, LaSalle D. Leffall Jr. received 14 honorary degrees from institutions including Georgetown University, Amherst College, Meharry Medical College, and Princeton University. He was elected to the National Academy of Medicine, joining the highest ranks of the U.S. medical and scientific community.

Among his many honors, Leffall received the prestigious Candace Award for Science in 1983 from the National Coalition of 100 Black Women. In 1984, the American Cancer Society awarded him its Distinguished Service Award, one of the organization's highest honors, recognizing his exemplary leadership and long-standing commitment to cancer prevention and education.

He was also the first recipient of the Society of Surgical Oncology’s Heritage Award in 2001, recognizing his trailblazing role in cancer surgery and mentorship.

In 1995, Leffall’s former students and colleagues established the LaSalle D. Leffall Jr. Surgical Society at the Howard University College of Medicine to honor his impact as a mentor and educator. His enduring legacy also inspired the creation of the biennial LaSalle D. Leffall Jr. Cancer Prevention and Control Award, presented jointly by MD Anderson Cancer Center and the Intercultural Cancer Council.

Beyond his clinical and policy work, Leffall held interim senior administrative positions at Howard, including as interim senior vice president and provost, while continuing to teach and mentor students until his death in 2019.

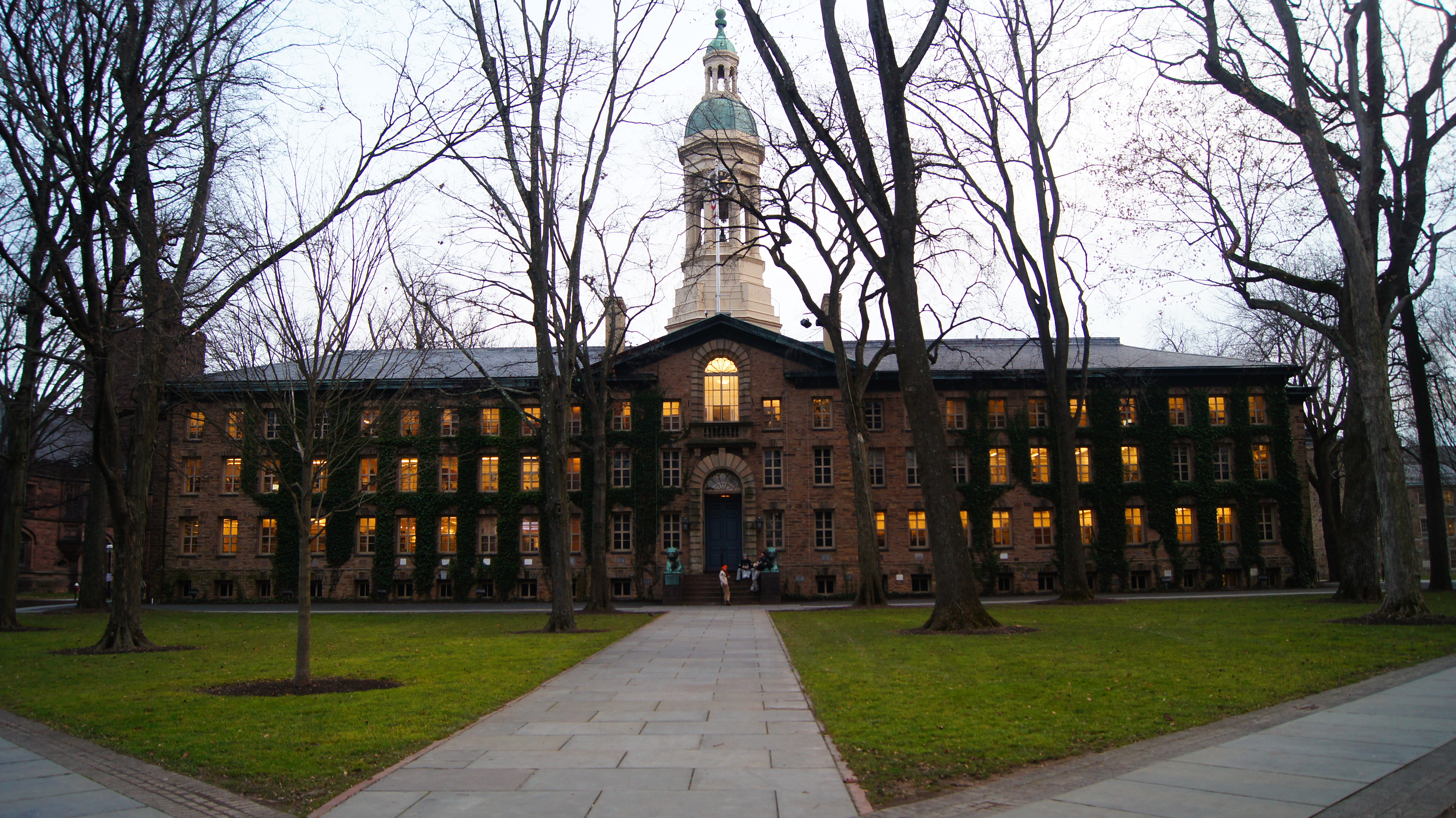
Nassau Hall at Princeton University, where Leffall received an honorary doctorate in recognition of his leadership and contributions to medicine.

== The price of courage ==
In a 1979 interview with The Washington Post, Dr. LaSalle Leffall reflected on the emotional cost of taking principled stands, referencing the controversy surrounding Muhammad Ali’s refusal to be drafted during the Vietnam War based on religious and racial beliefs. Leffall, who had by then built a respected medical career, acknowledged the challenge of maintaining high standards while breaking new ground as a Black physician. He emphasized that being among the first came with pressure to excel, as he felt he could not afford to fall short or set a poor example for those who would follow.

Mentorship played a consistent role in Leffall’s career. Dr. Wendy Greene, who trained at Howard University, recalled his reflections on what he called the “Grace Notes” of life—small but meaningful gestures that could enhance doctor–patient relationships. She noted that he emphasized the importance of listening not only to patients’ words, but also to the concerns behind them.

Leffall’s professional approach emphasized discipline, attentiveness, and sustained involvement in patient care. His contributions focused on practice and teaching rather than public attention.

== Death, personal life, and legacy ==
Leffall died of cancer on May 25, 2019, in Washington, D.C., at the age of 89. He is survived by his wife, Ruth Leffall; his son, LaSalle D. Leffall III, also known as "Donney"; his sister, Dolores C. Leffall.

=== Legacy and impact ===
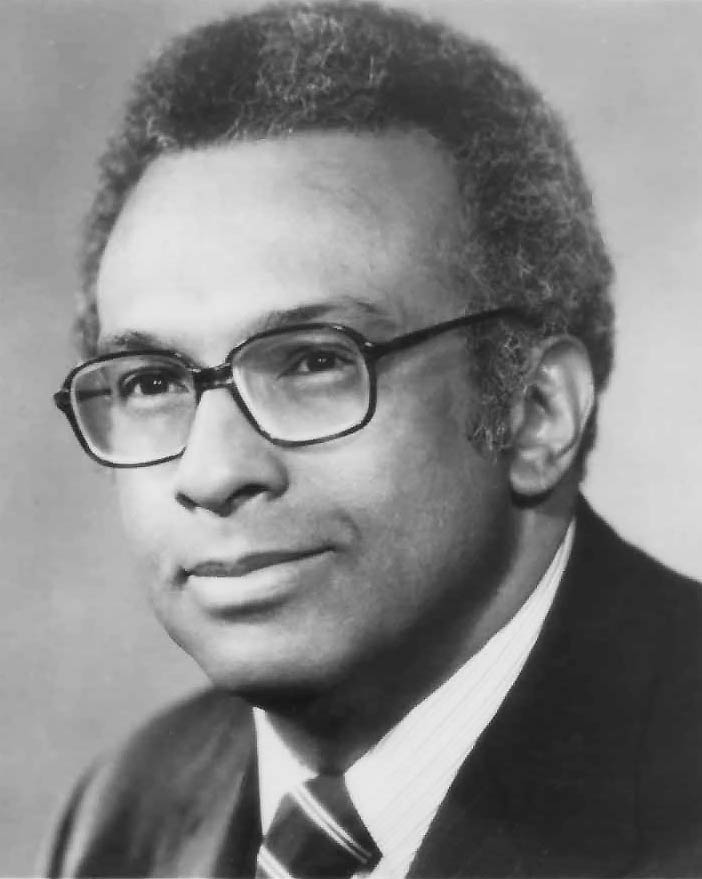
LaSalle D. Leffall Jr. at a symposium on health and medical communications, 1984

LaSalle D. Leffall Jr. was the first African American president of both the American Cancer Society and the American College of Surgeons, advancing diversity in national medical leadership.

As chair of surgery at Howard University College of Medicine, he trained generations of physicians and surgeons who went on to lead in academia, health policy, and clinical care.

Leffall championed cancer prevention and efforts to reduce health disparities, shaping national strategies focused on underserved communities.

Several honors have been established in his name, including the LaSalle D. Leffall Jr. Cancer Prevention and Control Award and the surgical society founded at Howard University.

Dr. Wayne A. I. Frederick, president of Howard University and former mentee, reflected:

Dr. LaSalle D. Leffall, Jr. was a surgeon, oncologist, medical educator, civic leader, and mentor to me and so many others. [...] Even at the height of his achievements, Dr. Leffall remained accessible, generous, and deeply committed to students and patients. I will always cherish performing my first operation as a fully accredited surgeon alongside him—his final surgery before retirement. In many ways, Dr. Leffall was, is, and always will be our ever-burning fire.

— Wayne A. I. Frederick, M.D., MBA, President, Howard University

== In popular culture ==
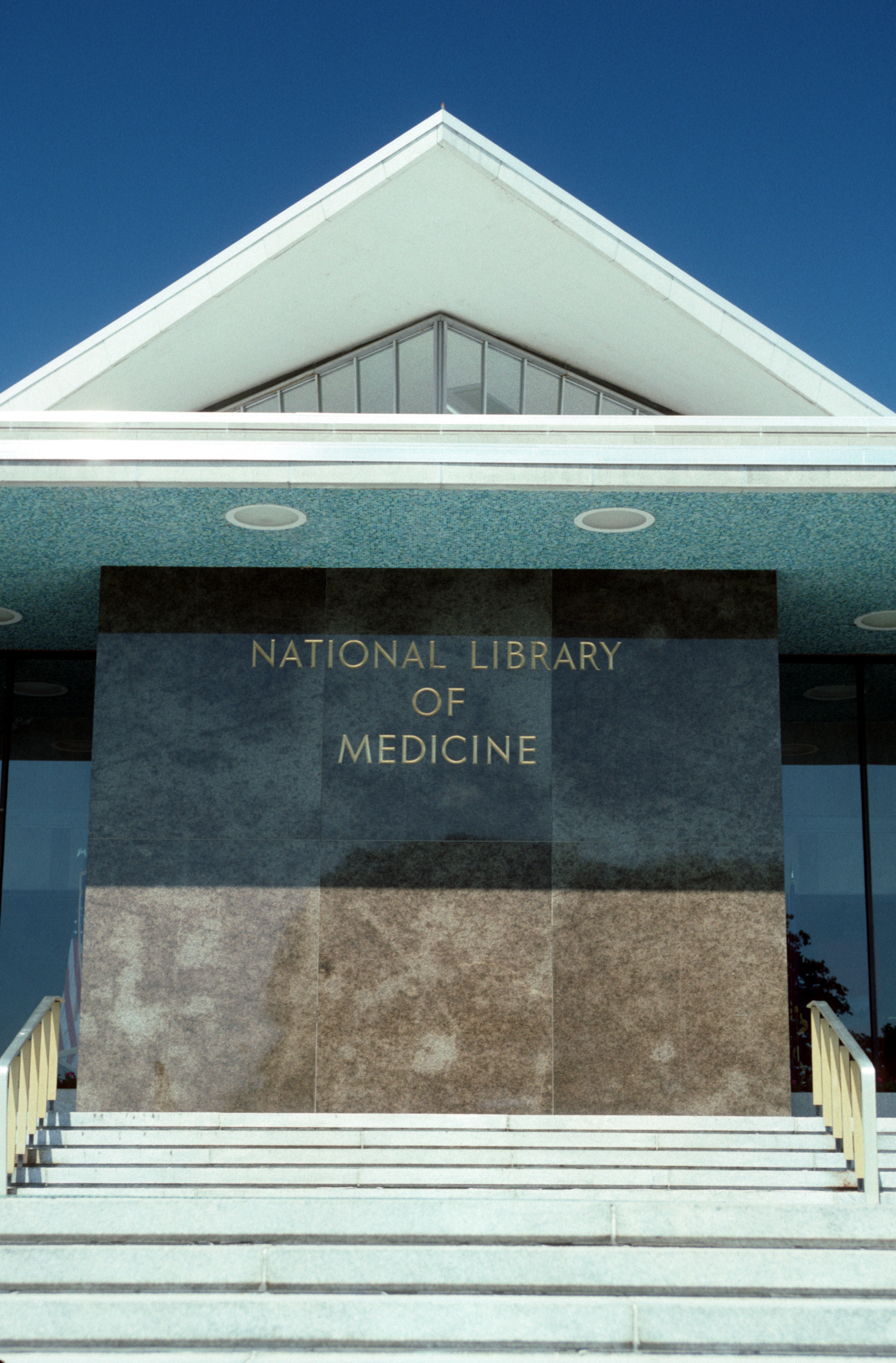
The National Library of Medicine, NIH campus, Bethesda, Maryland

LaSalle D. Leffall Jr. is featured in the National Library of Medicine’s Opening Doors: Contemporary African American Academic Surgeons exhibit, which recognizes his career as a surgical oncologist, educator, and national leader. The exhibit highlights his role as the first African American president of the American Cancer Society, his chairmanship at Howard University College of Medicine, and his advocacy for cancer prevention and health equity. Through this national exhibition, Leffall’s enduring legacy is showcased as an inspiration for future generations of physicians and surgeons.

== Awards, honors, leadership roles, and fellowships ==
Award	Organization	Year	Notes	Ref
Outstanding Young Man of the Year Award	American Cancer Society	1965	Recognized early volunteer leadership	
Candace Award for Science	National Coalition of 100 Black Women	1983	Distinguished contributions to medical science	
Distinguished Service Award	American Cancer Society	1984	Honored for dedicated service to ACS mission	
Presidential Award of Merit	American Cancer Society	1987	Recognized for outstanding national service in cancer advocacy	
Heritage Award	Society of Surgical Oncology	2001	Inaugural recipient of the society’s highest honor	
Charles R. Drew Award	Howard University College of Medicine	2005	Excellence in medical education and mentorship	
AACR Public Service Award	American Association for Cancer Research	2007	Recognized leadership in cancer prevention and disparities	
W. Montague Cobb Lifetime Achievement Award	National Medical Association	2011	Lifetime service to medical education, disparities work, and surgical mentorship	
Commander’s Award for Public Service	Walter Reed Army Medical Center	1970–2000	Principal Civilian Consultant in General Surgery for 30 years	
Gold Medal of Honor	American Surgical Association	2019 (posthumous)	Association’s highest honor for a lifetime of surgical achievement	

=== Leadership roles ===
Position	Organization	Years	Notes	Ref
President	American Cancer Society	1978–1979	First African American to lead the organization	
President	Society of Surgical Oncology	1990s	First African American president of the society	
President	American College of Surgeons	1995–1996	Served as national leader of the largest surgical organization	
Member	National Academy of Medicine	2000	Elected to one of the highest honors in U.S. medicine	
Chair	President’s Cancer Panel	2002–2011	Chaired federal advisory panel under Presidents George W. Bush and Barack Obama	
Chair, Board of Directors	Susan G. Komen Foundation	2002–2007, 2011–2012	Led disparity-focused outreach programs	

=== Fellowships and awards ===
Name	Type	Institution / Organization	Purpose and Significance	Ref
LaSalle D. Leffall Jr. Surgical Society	Alumni society / mentorship network	Howard University College of Medicine	Founded in 1995 by former students and colleagues to promote excellence in surgical education and mentorship.	
LaSalle D. Leffall Jr. Cancer Prevention and Control Award	Biennial award	MD Anderson Cancer Center & Intercultural Cancer Council	Recognizes individuals and programs advancing equity in cancer prevention and education, especially in underserved communities.	
LaSalle D. Leffall Jr. Endowed Lecture	Annual lecture	Howard University College of Medicine	Created to honor his legacy in surgical leadership and education; features prominent voices in academic surgery.	

=== Honorary degrees ===
Institution	Degree	Notes	Ref
Georgetown University	Honorary Doctor of Science	Recognized for leadership in surgical education and cancer advocacy	
Amherst College	Honorary Doctor of Science	Awarded for contributions to public health and mentorship	
Meharry Medical College	Honorary Doctor of Humane Letters	In recognition of his service to medical education and health equity	
Princeton University	Honorary Doctor of Science	Honored for pioneering efforts in medicine and public service	
Florida A&M University	Honorary Doctor of Science	Alma mater recognition; awarded for national achievements	
Howard University	Honorary Doctor of Science	Internal recognition of 25+ years of academic leadership	
Dartmouth College	Honorary Doctor of Science	Cited for leadership in cancer control and academic medicine	
Morehouse College	Honorary Doctor of Humane Letters	Tribute to his influence in African American health leadership	
University of Maryland, Baltimore	Honorary Doctor of Science	Recognized for advancing medical education and advocacy	
University of Virginia	Honorary Doctor of Science	Acknowledged for lifetime service to surgical excellence	
Boston University	Honorary Doctor of Science	Honored for contributions to clinical practice and health equity	
University of South Carolina	Honorary Doctor of Science	Recognition of national public health impact	
Tuskegee University	Honorary Doctor of Humane Letters	In tribute to mentorship and legacy in Black medical history	
University of the District of Columbia	Honorary Doctor of Science	Recognition of service to the D.C. medical community	

== Selected publications ==
Title	Year	Publisher	Co-authors	Summary	ISBN
No Boundaries: A Cancer Surgeon’s Odyssey	2005	Howard University Press	—	A memoir tracing Dr. Leffall’s journey from segregated Florida to national leadership in medicine, with reflections on race, cancer care, and professional service.	9780882582524
Equanimity Under Duress: Calmness and Courage in the Battle Against Cancer	2014	Howard University Press	—	An exploration of how calmness and resilience help both patients and physicians navigate the emotional challenges of cancer treatment.	9780882583804
Education, Excellence, and Exemplars: Howard University College of Medicine Sesquicentennial, 1868–2018	2017	Howard University	Vernon J. Butler, Edward E. Cornwell III	A commemorative volume celebrating 150 years of Howard University College of Medicine, highlighting influential figures and institutional milestones.	9780692887575

== Media ==
- The Washington Post: Dr. LaSalle Leffall, Howard University cancer surgeon and medical educator, dies at 89 (May 29, 2019). Comprehensive obituary highlighting his leadership in major surgical and oncology institutions.
- The Washington Post: The special spirit of the surgeon: Howard’s Dr. LaSalle Leffall by Jacqueline Trescott (February 16, 1979). Long-form profile celebrating Leffall’s surgical achievements, global outreach, and academic leadership.
- The Washington Post: Surgeon Helped Howard University Grow (February 15, 2009). Article tracing Leffall’s institutional leadership and influence on medical education.
- The Washington Post: Howard’s legendary Dr. LaSalle Leffall still going strong at 85 by Hamil R. Harris (May 19, 2015). Retrospective honoring his career longevity and continued impact at Howard.
- American College of Surgeons: LaSalle D. Leffall Jr., MD, FACS: Past Highlights (April 10, 2025). Profile documenting his presidency of ACS and pioneering efforts in surgical education and health equity.
- The New York Times: Dr. LaSalle D. Leffall Jr., 89, Dies; Cancer Society’s First Black Leader (May 31, 2019). Landmark obituary recognizing his historic roles in national surgical and cancer organizations.
- The Washington Post: LaSalle Leffall, first black leader of American Cancer Society, dies at 89 by Bart Barnes (May 29, 2019). Obituary reviewing his academic contributions and organizational leadership.
- Diverse: Issues In Higher Education: Remembering Dr. LaSalle D. Leffall (May 29, 2019). Reflections on his legacy in higher education and his role as a Black academic leader.
- Howard University Newsroom: Passing of Dr. LaSalle D. Leffall Jr. (May 31, 2019). Official announcement commemorating his decades of mentorship, public service, and medical excellence.
- The Cancer Letter: LaSalle D. Leffall Jr., one of only five surgeons in history to have served as president of both the American Cancer Society and the American College of Surgeons (May 31, 2019). Policy obituary documenting his leadership across surgical oncology societies.
- Susan G. Komen Foundation: Susan G. Komen mourns the passing of Dr. LaSalle D. Leffall Jr. (May 27, 2019). Tribute honoring his contributions to cancer research, education, and advocacy.

== Timeline ==
Legend

Birth and early life
Education
Family and military service
Academic and professional leadership
Awards and honors
Death

Click to expand timeline

May 22, 1930 – Born in Tallahassee, Florida.

↓

1948 – Graduated summa cum laude with a B.S. in biology from Florida A&M University.

↓

1952 – Earned M.D. from Howard University College of Medicine, graduating first in his class.

↓

1953–1957 – Completed surgical residency at Freedmen's Hospital.

↓

1960–1961 – Served as Major in the United States Army Medical Corps at U.S. Army Hospital in Munich, Germany.

↓

1962 – Joined faculty of Howard University College of Medicine.

↓

1970 – Appointed Chair of the Department of Surgery at Howard University.

↓

1978 – Elected first African American President of the American Cancer Society.

↓

1983 – Received the Candace Award for Science from the National Coalition of 100 Black Women.

↓

1992 – Named the first Charles R. Drew Professor of Surgery at Howard University.

↓

1995–1996 – Served as President of the American College of Surgeons.

↓

2001 – Received the inaugural Heritage Award from the Society of Surgical Oncology.

↓

2002–2011 – Chaired the President’s Cancer Panel under Presidents George W. Bush and Barack Obama.

↓

2002–2007, 2011–2012 – Chaired the Board of the Susan G. Komen Breast Cancer Foundation.

↓

2005 – Published memoir No Boundaries: A Cancer Surgeon’s Odyssey.

↓

May 25, 2019 – Died of cancer in Washington, D.C., at age 89.

== See also ==
- Howard University College of Medicine
- National Medical Association
- President’s Cancer Panel
- American Cancer Society
- American College of Surgeons
- Opening Doors: Contemporary African American Academic Surgeons
  - Alexa I. Canady
  - Charles R. Drew
  - Rosalyn P. Scott
  - Official exhibit page – U.S. National Library of Medicine
