= Jack E. White =

American physician (1921–1988)

Jack Edward White
- Born: July 24, 1921; Stuart, Florida
- Died: July 2, 1988 (aged 66); Washington, D.C.
- Education: Florida A&M College; Howard University College of Medicine; Memorial Sloan Kettering Cancer Center
- Occupations: physician, oncology surgeon, medical educator
- Medical career
- Institutions: Howard University College of Medicine
- Sub-specialties: Oncology surgery

Jack E. White (July 24, 1921 – July 2, 1988) was an American physician and cancer surgeon. He was the first African American to train in surgical oncology at Memorial Sloan Kettering Cancer Center. White later directed the cancer center at Howard University College of Medicine, where he also served as a full professor. He was elected to the Institute of Medicine in 1977, and also served as president of the American Cancer Society.

== Early life and education ==
Born in Stuart, Florida, White attended Florida A&M College, Howard University College of Medicine, and Memorial Sloan Kettering Cancer Center. White was a World War II veteran.

== Career ==
White trained at Howard University's Freedmen's Hospital in Washington, D.C., and at what was then called Memorial Hospital in Manhattan. At Memorial Sloan Kettering, White became the first African American physician to complete training in surgical oncology at an institution that had been founded in 1884 and is a leader in cancer research and treatment.

White joined the faculty at Howard in 1951, becoming a full professor by 1963. White became director of Howard's cancer center as well as its cancer training and research programs. He served on drug advisory panels for the Food and Drug Administration and he was a consultant to several foreign countries, including Cuba, Ethiopia, and Hatti.

Among other physicians White mentored, was LaSalle D. Leffall Jr., who also went on to specialty training at Memorial Sloan Kettering, became a Howard faculty member, and was elected president of the American Cancer Society.

White was known as an expert on cancers among African Americans. His research showed that Black patients died of cancer at high rates, and that many of those deaths could have been prevented with earlier detection and treatment.

== Post-retirement ==
After retiring from Howard in 1986, White continued to serve as a cancer adviser to groups in Washington, D.C.

== Honors ==
In 1977, White was elected to the Institute of Medicine. He was recognized by the American Cancer Society for "outstanding service to the cause of cancer control". Howard University awarded its Distinguished Alumni Achievement Award to White in March 1988.

== Personal life and death ==
White died of cancer in 1988. He was survived by his wife, Sara, and five children.
