= Women's Health and Cancer Rights Act =

US law

The U.S. Women's Health and Cancer Rights Act, also known as Janet's Law, signed into law on October 21, 1998 as part of the 1999 omnibus bill (Pub. L. 105–277 (text) (PDF)), contains protections for patients who elect breast reconstruction in connection with a mastectomy. This law, which is administered by the Department of Labor and Health and Human Services, states that group health plans, insurance companies, and health maintenance organizations (HMOs) must provide coverage for reconstructive surgery after mastectomy for breast cancer and prohibited "drive-through" mastectomies, where breast cancer patient's hospital stays were limited by their carriers. The required coverage includes all stages of reconstruction of the breast on which the mastectomy was performed, surgery and reconstruction of the other breast to produce a symmetrical appearance, prostheses, and treatment of physical complications of the mastectomy, including lymphedema.

Importantly, second opinions in or out of network for all cancer patients were also included, so that any cancer patient would have coverage to visit a major cancer center if they chose. In an additional breakthrough, self-insured plans were also subject to these mandates.

The history of the law is an interesting one. Before 1998, although several states had laws requiring health insurance carriers to cover reconstructive surgery, there was no federal legislation and many states did not offer such protection. Self-funded insurance plans, such as that often offered by unions, which fall under federal ERISA guidelines, also did not have such protection. A 32-year-old Long Island woman, Janet Franquet, was diagnosed with an aggressive form of breast cancer in late 1997. She required a mastectomy, after chemotherapy to try to shrink her tumor, and desired reconstructive surgery to restore the breast. Upon contacting her insurance carrier, her reconstructive surgeon, Dr. Todd Wider, learned that her insurance plan, a self-funded plan, refused to cover the reconstructive surgery, and considered it cosmetic. The carrier recommended using a skin graft. Dr. Wider went ahead and performed the surgery for free, but he was outraged by the carrier's decision. Wider decided to begin a crusade to change the law. He contacted several politicians, and Senator Alphonse D'Amato became an outspoken supporter of legislation to change this. D'Amato led a nationwide bipartisan lobbying effort that culminated in legislation that he sponsored with Senator Dianne Feinstein, and 21 other senators, including Senator Ted Kennedy.

Speaking on the floor of the Congress, Senator D'Amato said when he had heard that the insurance carrier had denied Ms. Franquet coverage for her surgery: "Mr. President, I decided that I would give Mrs. Franquet's insurance company a call. When I spoke with the Medical Director, he told me that 'replacement of a breast is not medically necessary. This is not a bodily function and therefore cannot and should not be replaced'...Luckily for her, Dr. Todd Wider agreed to forgo payment of this surgery... I ask you, Mr. President, how many other Janet Franquets are out there? Will they be lucky enough to have a Dr. Wider to take care of them?... Too many women have been denied reconstructive surgery because insurers have deemed the procedure cosmetic and not medically necessary. It is absolutely wrong".

Numerous breast cancer patients and groups were supportive, including Long Island breast cancer advocacy groups and ACOG, the American College of Obstetricians and Gynecologists. Mary Armao McCarthy, Executive Director of ACOG NYS and a breast cancer survivor whose coverage had been denied, was particularly active, as was Geri Barish, president of the Long Island breast cancer advocacy group, "1 in 9." As a result of their work with legislators and health groups, New York State laws were implemented just prior to the federal legislation.

On October 21, 1998, the Women's Health and Cancer Rights Act (WHCRA) was signed into federal law. Since the passage of this law, many thousands of women have had reconstructive surgery after mastectomy. In addition, second opinions at major cancer centers are routinely funded for any cancer patient. The law has an ongoing impact and is still referenced as a resource for patient rights.

While the 1998 Act was hugely significant, there is a proposed patient-authored amendment to this act circulating in the State of California, calling for greater control over treatment implementation by women, coverage by board-certified surgeons who are breast specialists rather than medical generalists, and surgery at hospitals with an appropriate length of stay rather than at a surgery center.

== See also ==
- Breast reconstruction

== Sources ==
- Congressional Record, V. 144, Pt. 19, October 19, 1998 to December 19, 1998
- Congressional Record, Women's Health and Cancer Rights Act of 1997, Hearing Before the Subcommittee on Health Care of the Committee on Finance, United States, Senate, on S.249, November 5, 1997.
- The Gaffe Heard Round N.Y., Washington Post
- Breast cancer conference focused on rights Newsday
- Is It Corrective or Cosmetic? Plastic Surgery Stirs a Debate Wall Street Journal
- Breast Reconstruction Practices in North America: Current Trends and Future Priorities, Seminars in Plastic Surgery
- Fact Sheet - Women's Health and Cancer Rights Act. U.S. Department of Labor
- Your Rights After A Mastectomy... Women's Health and Cancer Rights Act of 1998 U.S. Department of Labor
