= Pediatric neurosurgery =

Subspecialty of neurosurgery

Pediatric Neurosurgery is a subspecialty of neurosurgery; which includes surgical procedures that are related to the nervous system, brain and spinal cord; that treats children with operable neurological disorders.

== History ==
Boston Children's Hospital was the first hospital in the United States with a specialized neurosurgical service for children, established in 1929 by Harvey Cushing and Franc Ingraham.

As of 2009, there were fewer than 200 pediatric neurosurgeons in the United States. Approximately 80% of them were male. In the past 25 years, 391 doctors graduated from a pediatric neurosurgery program. Only 70% of them currently practice primarily pediatric rather than adult neurosurgery. Approximately 70% of them are in academic medicine.

== See also ==
- Medical specialties
- Pediatric neuropsychology
